= 514th =

514th may refer to:

- 514th Air Defense Group, disbanded United States Air Force (USAF) organization
- 514th Air Mobility Wing, wing of the United States Air Force based out of Joint Base McGuire-Dix-Lakehurst, New Jersey
- 514th Fighter-Interceptor Squadron, inactive United States Air Force unit
- 514th Flight Test Squadron (514 FLTS), part of the Ogden Air Logistics Center based at Hill Air Force Base, Utah
- 514th Troop Carrier Group or 514th Operations Group, United States Air Force Reserve unit, assigned to the 514th Air Mobility Wing

== See also ==
- 514 (number)
- 514, the year 514 (DXIV) of the Julian calendar
- 514 BC
