= 65th Military Airlift Support Group =

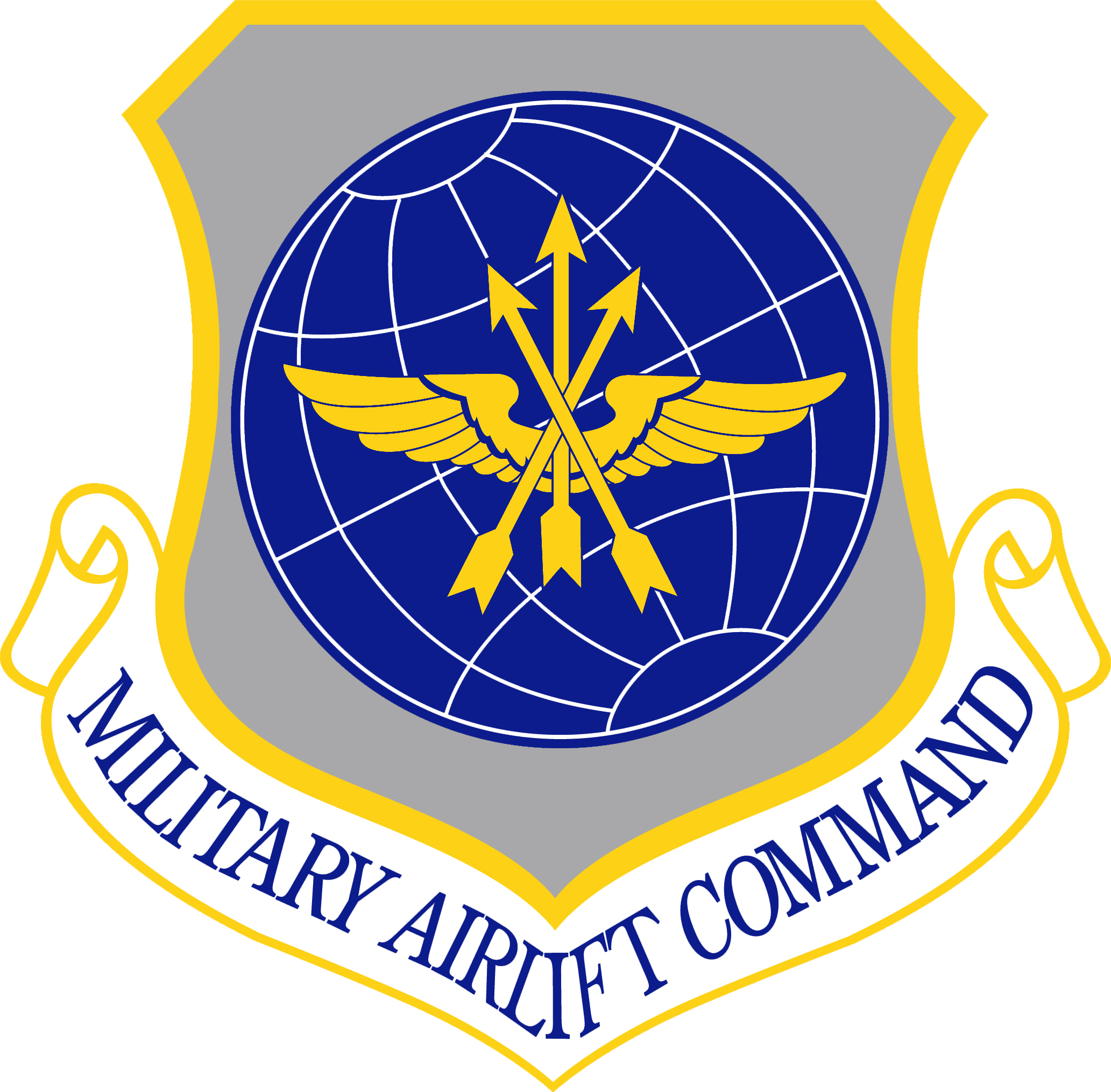
65th Military Airlift Support Group

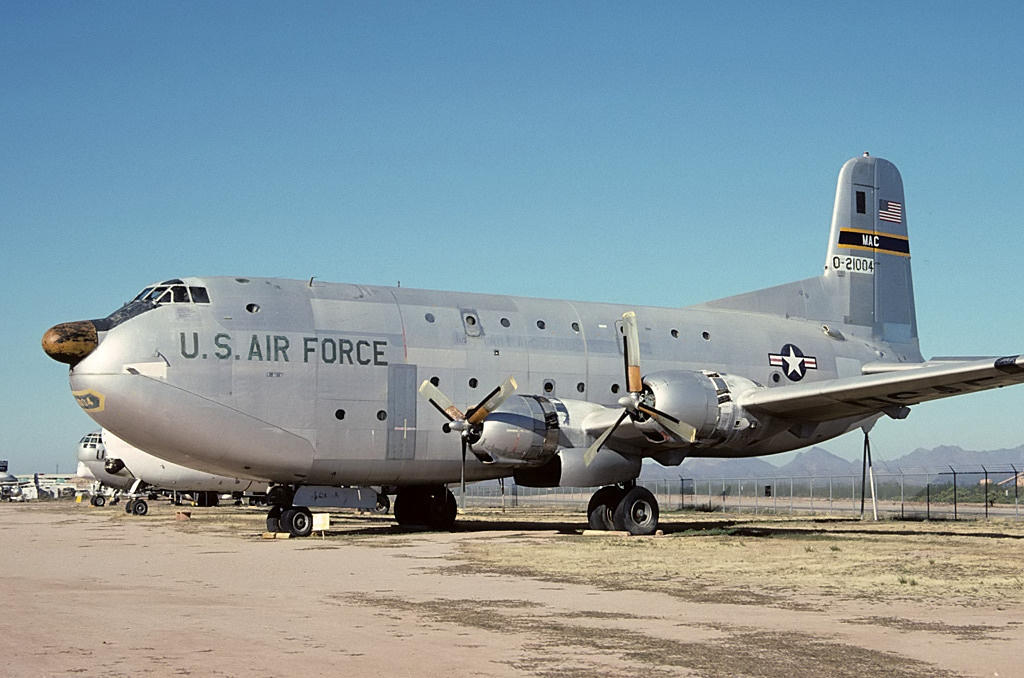
- C-124C Globemaster II of Military Airlift Command
- Active: 1941-1943; 1946-1949; 1952-1953; 1966-1972
- Country: United States
- Branch: United States Air Force
- Role: Airlift Support
- Part of: Military Airlift Command
- Decorations: Air Force Outstanding Unit Award

The 65th Military Airlift Support Group is an inactive unit of the United States Air Force. It was last active as part of Military Airlift Command at Yokota Air Base, Japan, where it was inactivated on 1 June 1972.

== History ==
=== World War II ===
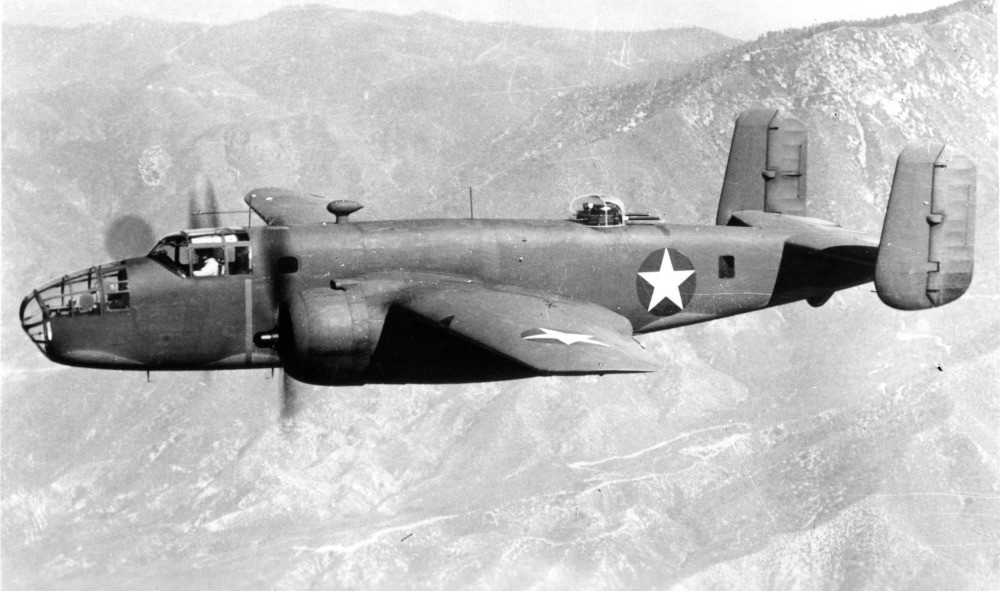
North American B-25C Mitchell

The group was first activated as the 65th Observation Group in September 1941 at Columbia Army Air Base, South Carolina. It initially consisted of three federalized National Guard squadrons, the 105th, 112th and 121st Observation Squadrons. The group supported ground units during the Carolina Maneuvers in the fall and winter of 1941. After the Japanese attack on Pearl Harbor, the group moved to Langley Field, Virginia with its 105th and 121st Squadrons and flew antisubmarine patrols off the East Coast until inactivating in October 42. The 112th Squadron operated patrols from Lantana Airport, Florida.

The group was reactivated at Columbia in March 1943 and within a few days was renamed the 65th Reconnaissance Group. It served as a training organization for aircrews that were transitioning from observation aircraft to North American B-25 Mitchells. It moved to Florence Army Air Field later in April, and the 309th Bombardment Group continued operational and replacement training at Columbia. The group continued B-25 training at Florence until August 1943, when it was disbanded and its personnel were transferred to the 411th Bombardment Group, which moved to Florence from Will Rogers Field, Oklahoma.

=== Air Force Reserve ===
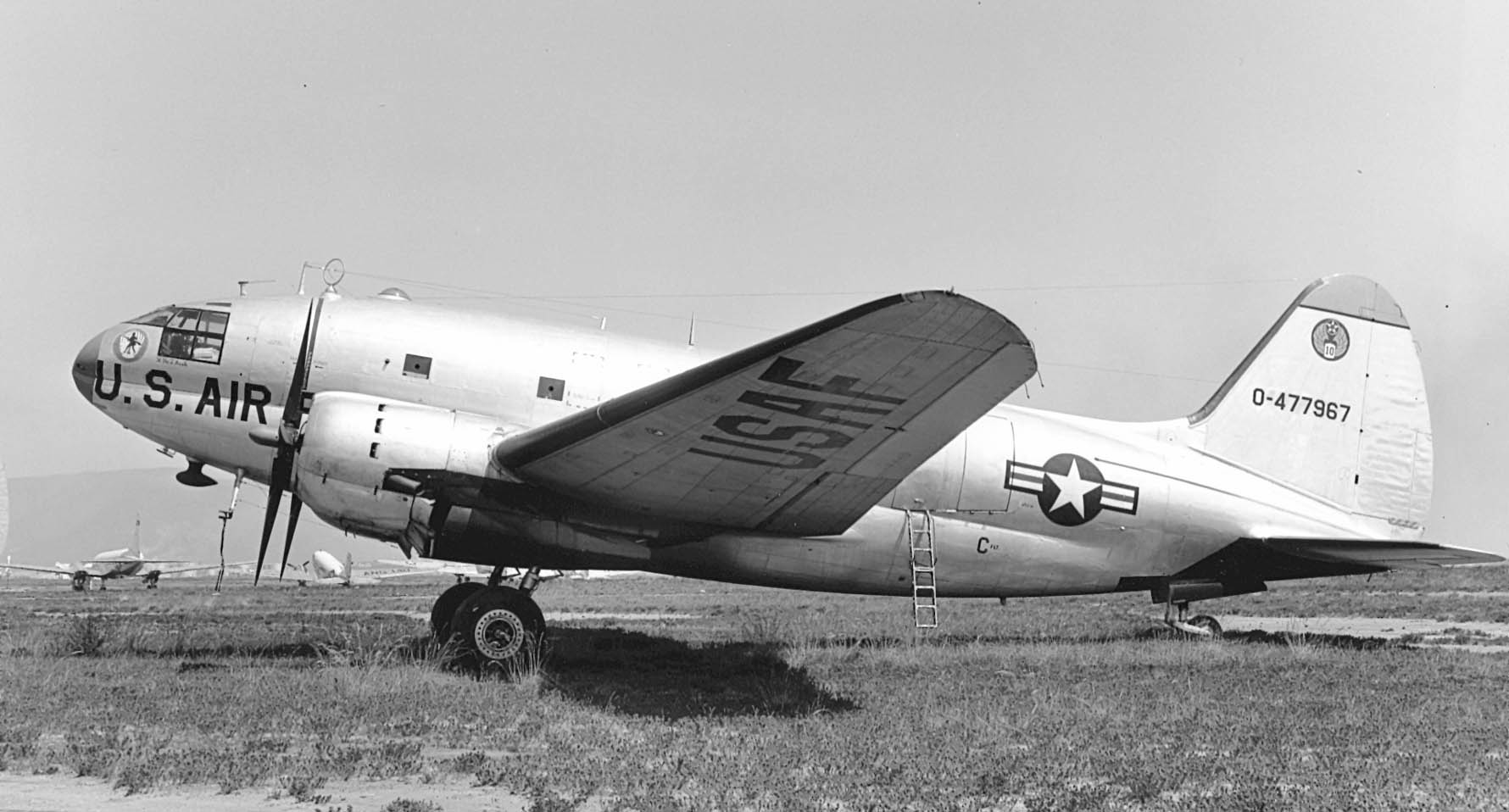
C-46 of the Air Force Reserve

The 65th was activated as a reserve unit under Air Defense Command (ADC) at Rome Army Air Field, New York in December 1946 under the supervision of the 111th AAF Base Unit (Reserve Training) (later the 2229th Air Force Reserve Training Center). However, its first squadron, the 13th Reconnaissance Squadron at Chemung County Airport, New York, was not activated until the following July. Two more squadrons were added at Rome in 1947, and the group began training. In 1948 Continental Air Command assumed responsibility for managing reserve and Air National Guard units from ADC. However, it does not appear that the group received any operational aircraft before it was inactivated. The 65th was inactivated when President Truman's reduced 1949 defense budget required reductions in the number of groups in the Air Force, and reserve flying operations at what was now Griffiss Air Force Base ceased.

The group was activated as a reserve unit a second time as the 65th Troop Carrier Group in June 1952, when it replaced the flying elements of the 914th Reserve Training Wing at Mitchel Air Force Base, New York. It conducted reserve training toward proficiency with Curtiss C-46 Commandos until April 1953. However, the group was never fully manned or equipped. In February 1953, the 514th Troop Carrier Group, a reserve unit that had been on active duty for the Korean War in 1951 was replaced at Mitchel by the 313th Troop Carrier Group and in April was activated to replace the 65th.

=== Military Airlift Command ===
The group was redesignated the 65th Military Airlift Group and activated in 1966 as a Military Airlift Command (MAC) unit at Tachikawa Air Base. At Tachikawa, the group replaced the 1503d Air Transport Group, whose 22d Military Airlift Squadron, flying Douglas C-124 Globemaster II, was reassigned to the 65th. The 1503d Group had replaced the 1503d Air Transport Wing in 1964, when MAC's predecessor, Military Air Transport Service (MATS), had reduced its heavy airlift in Japan to a single flying squadron. The 1503d, however, was a Major Command controlled (MAJCON) group, which could not carry a permanent history or lineage, and MAC wanted to replace MATS MAJCON units with permanent ones. (Note: The 65th was entitled to display the honors earned by the 1503d Group, although not its lineage. This entitlement did not extend to the honors of the 1503d Wing.)

The group lost its flying squadron in 1969, becoming the 65th Military Airlift Support Group, controlling airlift support units in Japan, Korea and Okinawa and was inactivated in 1972.

== Lineage ==
- Constituted as the 65th Observation Group on 21 August 1941

Activated on 1 September 1941
Inactivated on 18 October 1942

- Activated on 1 March 1943

Redesignated 65th Reconnaissance Group on 2 April 1943
Disbanded on 15 August 1943

- Reconstituted, allotted to the reserve and activated on 27 December 1946

Inactivated on 27 June 1949

- Redesignated 65th Troop Carrier Group, Medium on 26 May 1952

Activated on 14 June 1952
Inactivated on 1 April 1953

- Redesignated 65th Military Airlift Group in December 1965

Activated on 8 January 1966

- Redesignated 65th Military Airlift Support Group on 8 June 1969

Inactivated on 1 June 1972

=== Assignments ===
- 3d Ground Air Support Command (later III Air Support Command III Air Support Command, 1 September 1941 – 18 October 1942
- III Ground Air Support Command, 1 March – 15 August 1943
- 90th Reconnaissance Wing (later 90th Air Division), 27 December 1946 – 27 June 1949
- 65th Troop Carrier Wing, 14 June 1952 – 1 April 1953
- 61st Military Airlift Wing (later 61st Military Airlift Support Wing), 8 January 1966 - 1 June 1962

=== Components ===
Flying Squadrons

- 2d Reconnaissance Squadron (later 2d Troop Carrier Squadron), 6 October 1947 – 27 June 1949, 14 June 1952 – 1 April 1953
- 13th Reconnaissance Squadron (later 13th Troop Carrier Squadron), 6 July 1947 – 27 June 1949, 14 June 1952 – 1 April 1953

Chemung County Airport, New York, 26 January 1948 - 27 June 1949

- 14th Reconnaissance Squadron (later 14th Troop Carrier Squadron), 6 November 1947 – 27 June 1949, 14 June 1952 – 1 April 1953

Binghamton, New York

- 18th Observation Squadron (later 18th Reconnaissance Squadron), 19 March - 18 October 1942, 1 March - 15 August 1943
- 22d Military Airlift Squadron, 8 January 1966 – 8 June 1969
- 105th Observation Squadron (later 105th Reconnaissance Squadron), 1 September 1941 – 18 October 1942; 1 March - 15 August 1943
- 112th Observation Squadron, 1 September 1941 – 18 October 1942
- 121st Observation Squadron, 1 September 1941 – 18 October 1942

Support Squadrons

- 603d Military Airlift Support Squadron, 8 July 1966 – 1 June 1972

Kadena Air Base, Okinawa

- 605d Military Airlift Support Squadron, 8 July 1966 – 8 June 1969

Andersen Air Force Base, Guam

- 609th Military Airlift Support Squadron, 8 January 1966 – 15 December 1969

Tachikawa Air Base, Japan

- 610th Military Airlift Support Squadron, 8 April 1966 – 1 June 1972

Yokota Air Base, Japan

- 611th Military Airlift Support Squadron, 8 April 1969 – 1 June 1972

Kimpo Air Base, Korea

=== Stations ===
- Columbia Army Air Base, South Carolina, 1 September 1941
- Langley Field, Virginia, December 1941 - 18 October 1942
- Columbia Army Air Base, South Carolina, 1 March 1943
- Florence Army Air Field, South Carolina, c. 15 April – 15 August 1943
- Rome Army Air Field (later Rome Air Force Base), New York, 27 December 1946 – 27 June 1949
- Mitchel Air Force Base, New York, 14 June 1952 – 1 April 1953
- Tachikawa Air Base, Japan, 8 January 1966
- Yokota Air Base, Japan, 1967 - 1 June 1972

=== Aircraft ===
- Douglas O-38 (1941–1942)
- North American O-47 (1941–1942)
- Stinson O-49 Vigilant (1941–1942)
- Curtiss O-52 Owl (1941–1942)
- North American AT-6 Texan (1941–1942)
- North American B-25 Mitchell (1943)
- Curtiss C-46 Commando (1952–1953)
- Douglas C-124 Globemaster II (1966-1969)

=== Awards and campaigns ===
Award streamer	Award	Dates	Notes
	Air Force Outstanding Unit Award	8 January 1966-23 January 1966	65th Military Airlift Group
	Air Force Outstanding Unit Award	8 January 1966-30 June 1966	65th Military Airlift Group
	Air Force Outstanding Unit Award	1 July 1966-30 June 1967	65th Military Airlift Group
	Air Force Outstanding Unit Award	1 July 1967-30 June 1968	65th Military Airlift Group
	Air Force Outstanding Unit Award	1 July 1968-30 June 1970	65th Military Airlift Group (later 65th Military Airlift Support Group)
	Air Force Outstanding Unit Award	1 July 1970-31 December 1971	65th Military Airlift Support Group

Campaign Streamer	Campaign	Dates	Notes
	Antisubmarine	7 December 1941 – 18 October 1942	65th Observation Group
