= 2nd Troop Carrier Squadron =

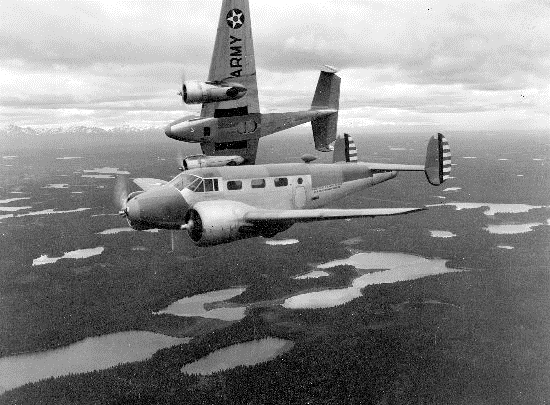
- Beechcraft F-2 Expeditors over Alaska in 1941
- Active: 1941–1946; 1947–1949; 1952–1953
- Country: United States
- Branch: United States Air Force
- Type: Aerial mapping
- Engagements: Southwest Pacific Theater
- Decorations: Philippine Presidential Unit Citation

Insignia
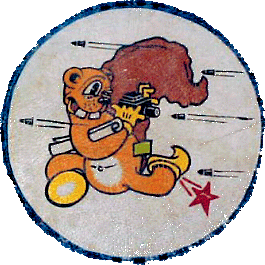
- 2nd Reconnaissance Squadron emblem (approved 10 October 1942)

The 2nd Troop Carrier Squadron is an inactive United States Air Force unit. It was last active in the reserve with the 65th Troop Carrier Group at Mitchel Air Force Base, New York where it was training with Curtiss C-46 Commandos. It was replaced by another unit, which absorbed its resources on 1 April 1953.

The squadron was first activated as the United States built up its forces before its entry into World War II as the 2nd Photographic Squadron. It was initially equipped with Beechcraft F-2 Expeditors equipped for photographic mapping. The squadron operated primarily in the northern and western United States until 1944, although it flew early missions over Japan in the summer of 1944. Later that year, it deployed to the Southwest Pacific Theater, remaining there until returning to the United States and inactivating in March 1946.

The squadron was briefly active in the reserve from 1947 to 1949, but does not appear to have been fully manned or equipped with operational aircraft before inactivating. It was again activated as an airlift unit in 1952 as the reserve began to rebuild following its mobilization for the Korean War.

== History ==
=== World War II ===
The squadron was first activated as the 2nd Photographic Squadron in June 1941, one of the original four squadrons of the 1st Photographic Group. Although group headquarters was at Bolling Field in the District of Columbia, its four squadrons were spread throughout the continental United States and the 2nd was organized at Gray Field, Washington and initially equipped with Beechcraft F-2 Expeditors. Because of the squadron's location in the northwest, it mapped not only portions of the United States, but sent elements on mapping missions in Canada and as far away as Alaska once it was organized and equipped.

In 1942, the squadron began to replace its F-2s with longer range aircraft, including Lockheed A-29 Hudson, and for a brief period some Douglas F-3 Havocs. Its use of these aircraft included deployments in 1942 and 1943 to perform mapping missions in South America in support of the 1st Group's global mission. In January 1944, the squadron moved to Peterson Field, Colorado, where it joined 1st Group headquarters, which had moved there the previous month. In Colorado, the squadron converted to even longer range Liberators, flying both the F-7 reconnaissance and B-24 heavy bomber versions of the plane. From June through September 1944, the squadron flew long range missions over the Japanese Kuril Islands in the North Pacific. Along with the Boeing B-29 Superfortress raid on Yawata's Imperial Iron and Steel Works the same month, these were some of the first flights over Japan since the Doolittle Raid of April 1942.

Army Air Forces global mapping operations had outgrown the 1st Group, and in October, the group was disbanded and the squadron was assigned directly to the 311th Photographic Wing. The same month the squadron deployed to the Hollandia Airfield Complex, New Guinea, where it was attached to Far East Air Forces, although it remained assigned to the 311th Wing. It moved forward to Morotai and for the remainer of the war the squadron engaged in long-range mapping and reconnaissance in the Southwest Pacific Theater, earning a Philippine Presidential Unit Citation. Following V-J Day, the squadron remained in the Philippines until February 1946, when it returned to Buckley Field, Colorado, where it was inactivated at the end of March 1946.

=== Air Force reserve ===
The squadron was reactivated in the reserve at Rome Army Air Field, New York in October 1947 and assigned to the 65th Reconnaissance Group. At Rome (later Griffiss Air Force Base), the squadron trained under the supervision of Air Defense Command's 111th AAF Base Unit (later the 2229th Air Force Reserve Training Center). Although nominally a photographic reconnaissance unit, it is not clear whether or not the squadron was fully staffed or equipped with operational aircraft. In July 1948, Continental Air Command assumed responsibility for managing reserve and Air National Guard units from ADC. President Truman's reduced 1949 defense required reductions in the number of units in the Air Force, and the 2nd was inactivated and not replaced as reserve flying operations at Griffiss ceased.

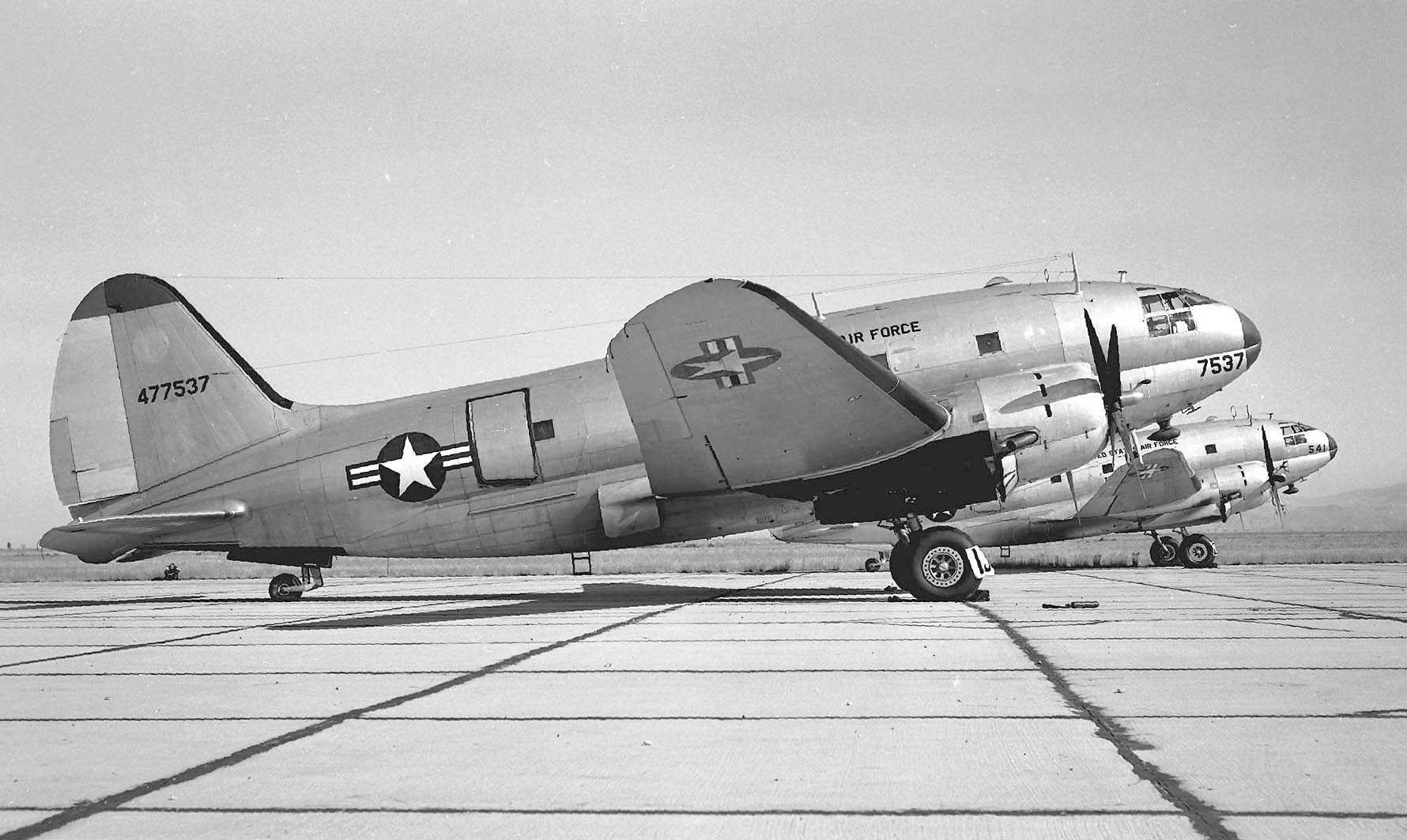
Curtiss C-46D as flown by the squadron in the reserve

All reserve combat units had been mobilized for the Korean War. This mobilization left the reserve without aircraft, and reserve units did not receive aircraft until July 1952. As aircraft began to be assigned to reserve units, the 65th Troop Carrier Wing was activated at Mitchel Air Force Base on 14 June 1952. It replaced the 914th Reserve Training Wing, a nonflying unit that had been organized on 1 July 1951 at Mitchell under First Air Force. The squadron was redesignated the 2nd Troop Carrier Squadron and assigned to the wing's 65th Troop Carrier Group. The 65th Wing trained with Curtiss C-46 Commandos under the supervision of the regular 2233rd Air Force Reserve Combat Training Center. However, before the squadron could fully equip or man, the 65th Wing was replaced at Mitchel by the 514th Troop Carrier Wing, which had been released from active duty in February 1953. The squadron was inactivated on 1 April 1953 and its personnel and equipment were transferred to the 335th Troop Carrier Squadron, which was simultaneously activated.

== Lineage ==
- Constituted as the 2nd Photographic Squadron on 15 May 1941

Activated on 10 June 1941
Redesignated 2nd Mapping Squadron on 13 January 1942
Redesignated 2nd Photographic Mapping Squadron on 9 June 1942
Redesignated 2nd Photographic Charting Squadron on 11 August 1943
Redesignated 2nd Reconnaissance Squadron (Long Range, Photographic) on 15 June 1945
Redesignated 2nd Reconnaissance Squadron (Very Long Range, Photographic) on 20 November 1945
Inactivated on 31 March 1946

- Redesignated 2nd Reconnaissance Squadron (Photographic) on 11 March 1947

Activated in the reserve on 6 October 1947
Inactivated on 27 June 1949
Redesignated 2nd Troop Carrier Squadron, Medium on 26 May 1952
Activated in the reserve on 14 June 1952
Inactivated on 1 April 1953

=== Assignments ===
- 1st Photographic Group (later 1st Mapping Group, 1st Photographic Charting Group), 10 June 1941
- 311th Photographic Wing (later 311th Reconnaissance Wing), 5 October 1944 – 31 March 1946 (attached to Far East Air Forces, 20 October 1944 – 4 February 1946)
- 65th Reconnaissance Group, 6 October 1947 – 27 June 1949
- 65th Troop Carrier Group, 14 June 1952 – 1 April 1953

=== Stations ===
- Gray Field, Washington, 10 June 1941
- Geiger Field, Washington, 2 January 1942;
- Felts Field, Washington, 1 February 1942
- Peterson Field, Colorado, 5 January 1944
- Buckley Field, Colorado, 2 July – 2 September 1944
- Hollandia Airfield Complex, New Guinea, 20 October 1944
- Wama Airfield, Morotai, Netherlands East Indies, 13 December 1944
- Puerto Princesa Airfield, Palawan, Philippines, 5 May 1945
- Clark Field, Luzon, Philippines, 22 January – 4 February 1946
- Buckley Field, Colorado, 9 February – 31 March 1946
- Rome Army Air Field (later Rome Air Force Base, Griffiss Air Force Base), New York, 6 October 1947 – 27 June 1949
- Mitchel Air Force Base, New York, 14 June 1952 – 1 April 1953

=== Aircraft ===
- Beechcraft F-2 Expeditor, 1941–1942
- Lockheed A-29 Hudson, 1942–1943
- Douglas F-3 Havoc, 1942
- North American B-25 Mitchell, 1943–1944
- Consolidated B-24 Liberator, 1944–1946
- Consolidated F-7 Liberator, 1944–1946
- Curtiss C-46 Commando, 1952–1953

=== Awards and campaigns ===
Award streamer	Award	Dates	Notes
	Philippine Republic Presidential Unit Citation	10 December 1944-4 July 1945	2nd Photographic Charting Squadron (later 2nd Reconnaissance Squadron)

Campaign Streamer	Campaign	Dates	Notes
	American Theater without inscription	7 December 1941 – 2 March 1946	2nd Photographic Squadron (later 2nd Photographic Mapping Squadron, 2nd Photographic Charting Squadron, 2nd Reconnaissance Squadron)
	New Guinea	20 October 1944 – 31 December 1944	2nd Photographic Charting Squadron
	Southern Philippines	27 February 1945 – 4 July 1945	2nd Photographic Charting Squadron (later 2nd Reconnaissance Squadron)
