= 335 Squadron =

335 Squadron may refer to:

- 335th Squadron (HAF), Greece
- 335 Squadron, Royal Norwegian Air Force
- 335th Airlift Squadron, United States
- 335th Bombardment Squadron, United States
- 335th Fighter Squadron, United States
