= 904th Tactical Airlift Group =

904th Military Airlift Group

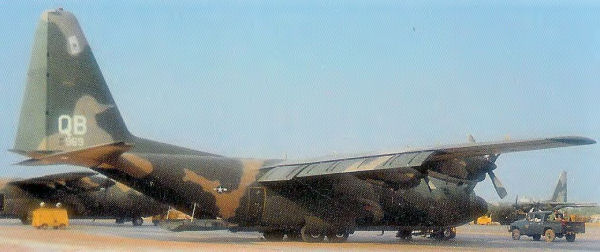
- C-130 Hercules as flown by the group
- Active: 1963–1975
- Country: United States
- Branch: United States Air Force
- Role: Airlift

Insignia
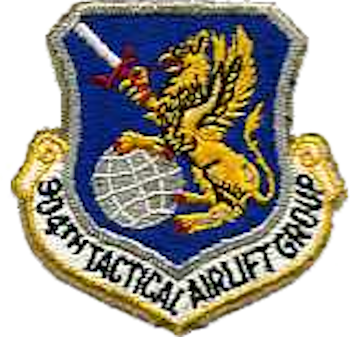
- 904th Tactical Airlift Group emblem

The 904th Military Airlift Group is an inactive United States Air Force Reserve unit. It was last active with the 459th Military Airlift Wing at Stewart Air Force Base, New York, where it was inactivated on 31 December 1969.

== History ==
=== Need for reserve troop carrier groups ===
During the first half of 1955, the Air Force began detaching Air Force Reserve squadrons from their parent wing locations to separate sites. The concept offered several advantages. Communities were more likely to accept the smaller squadrons than the large wings and the location of separate squadrons in smaller population centers would facilitate recruiting and manning. Continental Air Command (ConAC)'s plan called for placing Air Force Reserve units at fifty-nine installations located throughout the United States. When these relocations were completed in 1959, reserve wing headquarters and wing support elements would typically be on one base, along with one (or in some cases two) of the wing's flying squadrons, while the remaining flying squadrons were spread over thirty-five Air Force, Navy and civilian airfields under what was called the Detached Squadron Concept.

Although this dispersal was not a problem when the entire wing was called to active service, mobilizing a single flying squadron and elements to support it proved difficult. This weakness was demonstrated in the partial mobilization of reserve units during the Berlin Crisis of 1961 To resolve this, at the start of 1962, Continental Air Command, (ConAC) determined to reorganize its reserve wings by establishing groups with support elements for each of its troop carrier squadrons. This reorganization would facilitate mobilization of elements of wings in various combinations when needed. However, as this plan was entering its implementation phase, another partial mobilization occurred for the Cuban Missile Crisis, with the units being released on 22 November 1962. The formation of troop carrier groups occurred in January 1963 for units that had not been mobilized, but was delayed until February for those that had been.

=== Activation of 904th Troop Carrier Group ===
As a result, the 904th Troop Carrier Group was established at Stewart Air Force Base, New York on 17 January 1963, as the headquarters for the 336th Troop Carrier Squadron, which had been stationed there since November 1957. Along with group headquarters, a Combat Support Squadron, Materiel Squadron and a Tactical Infirmary were organized to support the 336th.

The group mission was to organize, recruit and train Air Force Reserve personnel in the tactical airlift of airborne forces, their equipment and supplies and delivery of these forces and materials by airdrop, landing or cargo extraction systems. The group was equipped with C-119 Flying Boxcars for Tactical Air Command airlift operations.

The 904th was one of three C-119 groups assigned to the 514th TCW in 1963, the others being the 903d Troop Carrier Group at McGuire AFB, New Jersey and 905th Troop Carrier Group at Bradley Field, Connecticut.

Reassigned to Military Airlift Command, 1966, trained and re-equipped with C-124 Globemaster II intercontinental transports. Began flying worldwide airlift missions. Elevated to active-duty in January 1968 to provide additional airlift support for the Vietnam War. Returned to reserve status, June 1969. Inactivated with retirement of C-124 in December 1969 and inactivation of Stewart AFB.

== Lineage ==
- Established as 904th Troop Carrier Group, Medium and activated on 28 December 1962 (not organized)

Organized in the Reserve on 17 January 1963
Redesignated 904th Tactical Airlift Group on 1 July 1966
Redesignated 904th Military Airlift Group (Associate) on 1 October 1966
Ordered to Active Service on 26 January 1968
Relieved from Active Duty on 2 June 1969
Redesignated 904th Tactical Airlift Group on 1 April 1972
Inactivated on 1 September 1975

=== Assignments ===
- Continental Air Command, 28 December 1963
- 514th Troop Carrier Wing, 17 January 1963
- 459th Military Airlift Wing, 1 July 1966
- 445th Military Airlift Wing, 26 January 1968
- 459th Military Airlift Wing, 2 June 1969
- 452d Military Airlift Wing (later 452d Tactical Airlift Wing), 31 December 1969 – 1 September 1975

=== Components ===
- 336th Troop Carrier Squadron (later 336th Tactical Airlift Squadron, 336th Military Airlift Squadron, 336th Tactical Airlift Squadron), 17 January 1963 – 1 September 1975

=== Stations ===
- Stewart Air Force Base, New York, 17 January 1963
- Hamilton Air Force Base, California, 31 December 1969 – 1 September 1975

=== Aircraft ===
- C-119 Flying Boxcar, 1963–1966
- C-124 Globemaster II, 1966–1972
- Lockheed C-130 Hercules, 1972–1975
