= 336th Air Refueling Squadron =

US Air Force Reserve unit

336th Air Refueling Squadron

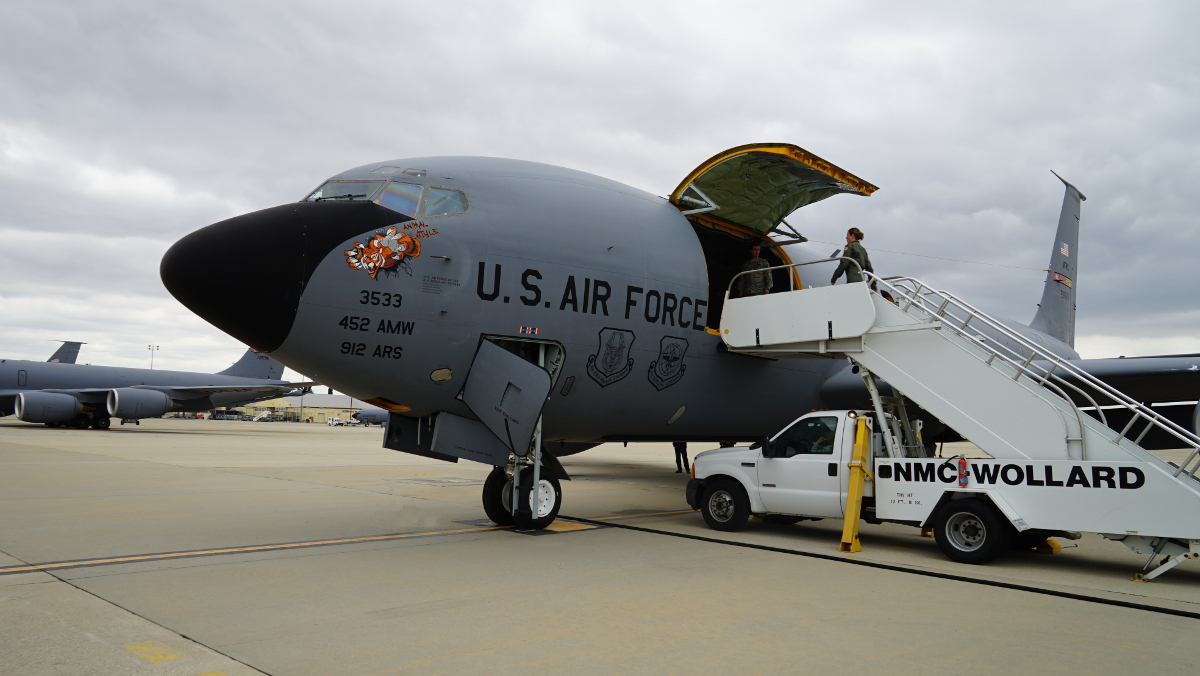
- Squadron KC-135 Stratotanker at March Air Reserve Base
- Active: 1942–1944; 1949–1953; 1953–present
- Country: United States
- Branch: United States Air Force
- Role: Aerial refueling
- Part of: Air Force Reserve Command
- Garrison/HQ: March Joint Air Reserve Base
- Mottos: The First and the Finest (1996-present)
- Decorations: Air Force Outstanding Unit Award; Republic of Vietnam Gallantry Cross with Palm

Insignia
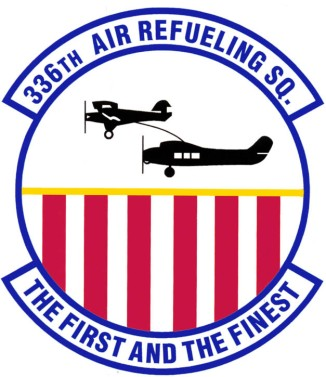
- 336th Air Refueling Squadron emblem (Note: Approved 28 May 1997.)

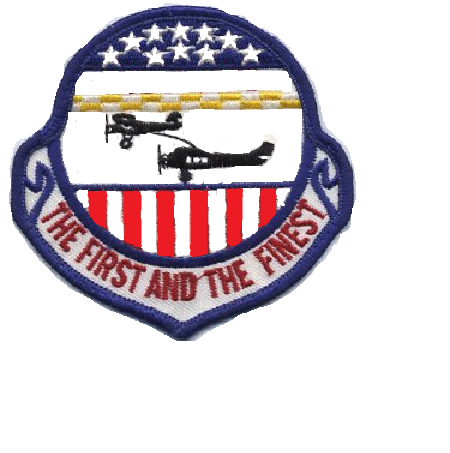
- 336th Air Refueling Squadron emblem (Note: Approved 29 July 1996.)

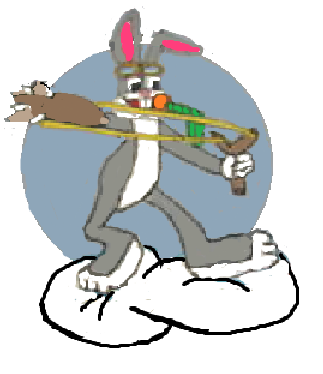
- 536th Bombardment Squadron emblem (Note: Approved 2 December 1943. Description: Over and through a grayed light blue disc, "Bugs Bunny" proper, standing on a white cloud formation in base, shooting a brown and tan aerial bomb held in the right forepaw with a brown slingshot held in the left forepaw, while chewing a carrot proper.)

Aircraft flown
- Tanker: Boeing KC-135 Stratotanker

The 336th Air Refueling Squadron is a United States Air Force Reserve squadron, assigned to the 452d Operations Group, stationed at March Joint Air Reserve Base, California. The squadron shares its aircraft and facility with the 912th Air Refueling Squadron, a USAF Associate Unit assigned to the 92d Air Refueling Wing.

The first predecessor of the squadron was the 536th Bombardment Squadron, active during World War II. It served as a training unit in the southwestern United States before being inactivated in 1944 during a reorganization of the Army Air Force's training units.

The second predecessor of the squadron was organized in the reserves in 1949 as the 336th Troop Carrier Squadron.

== Mission ==
The squadron operates the Boeing KC-135 Stratotanker aircraft conducting air refueling missions.

== History ==
=== World War II ===
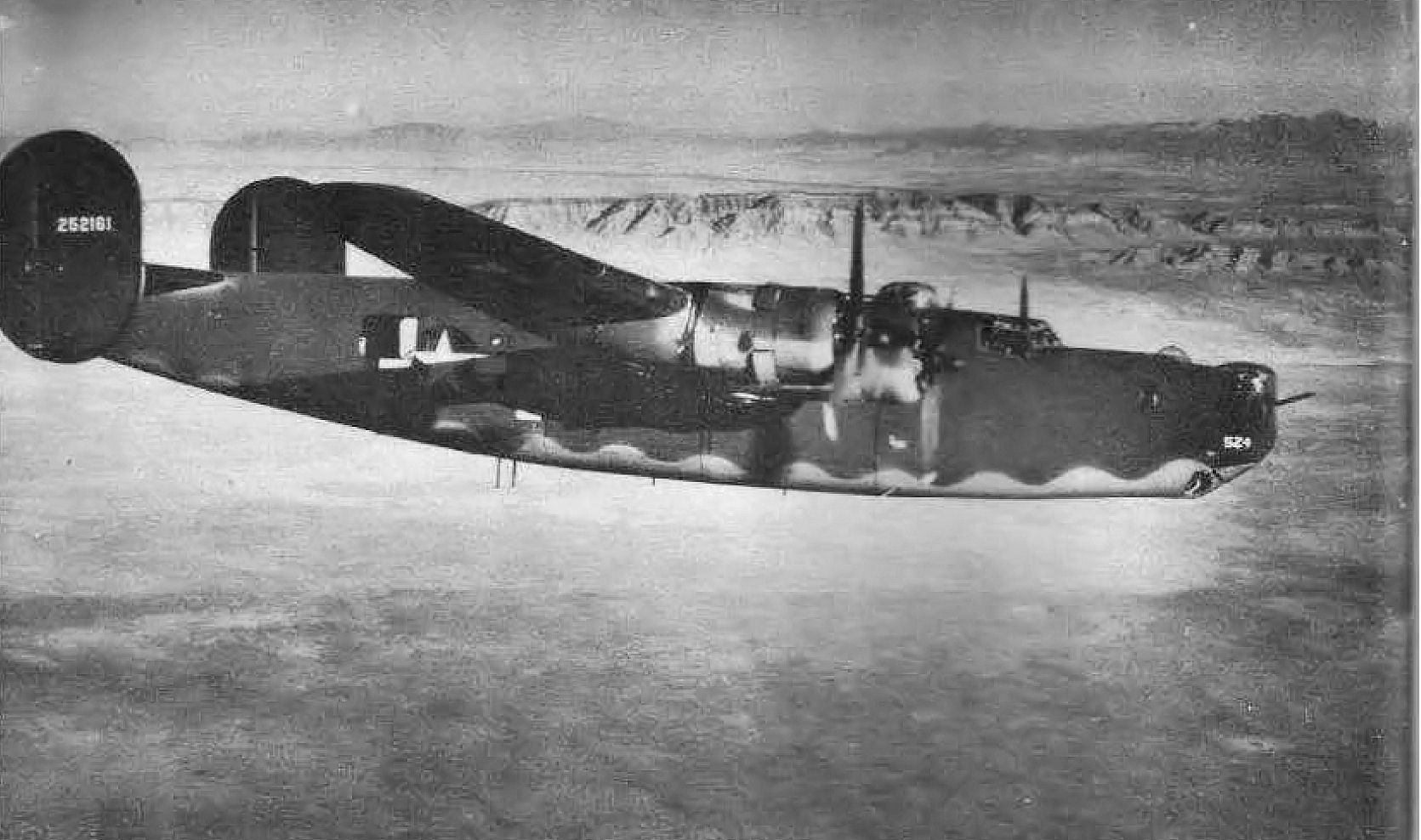
B-24 Liberator of a training unit in the southwest

The first predecessor of the squadron is the 536th Bombardment Squadron, which was activated at Salt Lake City Army Air Base in November 1942 as one of the four original squadrons of the 382d Bombardment Group. The squadron moved to Davis–Monthan Field, Arizona in January 1943 and began to operate as an Operational Training Unit (OTU) for Consolidated B-24 Liberator units. The OTU program involved the use of an oversized parent unit to provide cadres to "satellite groups". In April 1943, the squadron moved to Pocatello Army Air Field, Idaho, where its mission changed to acting as a Replacement Training Unit (RTU) for Liberator aircrews. RTUs were also oversized units, but their mission was to train individual pilots or aircrews.

However, the Army Air Forces (AAF) was finding that standard military units like the 536th, based on relatively inflexible tables of organization were not well adapted to the training mission. Accordingly, the AAF adopted a more functional system in which each base was organized into a separate numbered unit, whose manning and equipment was tailored to the base's mission. As a result of this reorganization, the 536th was inactivated, and along with other units at Muroc Army Air Field, California, replaced by the 421st AAF Base Unit (Bombardment Replacement Training Unit-Heavy).

=== Air Force Reserve ===
==== Initial activation and the Korean War ====
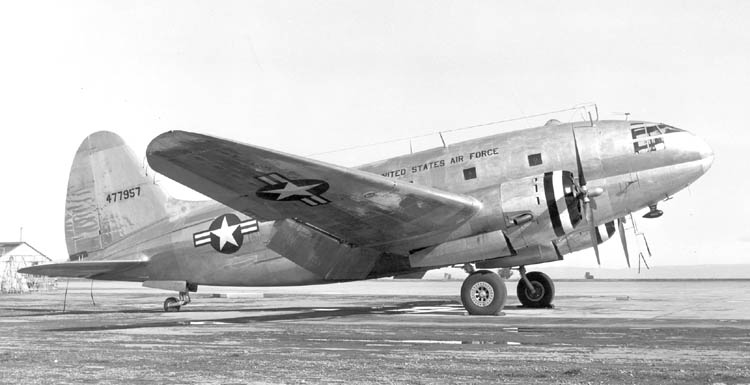
AF reserve C-46 (Note: Aircraft is Curtiss C-46D-15-CU Commando, serial 44-77957. Taken at Hamilton AFB. This airplane was transferred to the Japanese Air Self Defense Force. Baugher, Joe (18 March 2023). "1944 USAF Serial Numbers". Joe Baugher.)

The second predecessor of the squadron was organized in the reserves as the 336th Troop Carrier Squadron at Birmingham Municipal Airport, Alabama in June 1949, although it moved to Mitchel Air Force Base, New York in October along with its parent 514th Troop Carrier Group. At Mitchel, it trained under the supervision of Continental Air Command (ConAC)'s 2233d Air Force Reserve Flying Training Center. The 514th Group was equipped with Curtiss C-46 Commandos during this period, but it is not clear if any of the group's operational aircraft were assigned to the squadron.

All reserve combat units were mobilized for the Korean War. The squadron was mobilized on 1 May 1951, Its parent 514th Troop Carrier Wing was one of six C-46 wings were mobilized for Tactical Air Command and assigned to Eighteenth Air Force. The squadron remained at Mitchel and performed airlift missions until relieved from active duty on 1 February 1953. The squadron's personnel and equipment were transferred to the 47th Troop Carrier Squadron, which was activated at Mitchel the same day.

==== Return to reserve airlift operations ====
The reserve began to receive aircraft again in July 1952. While the squadron was still serving on active duty, ConAC had formed the 65th Troop Carrier Wing at Mitchel in 1952 as a reserve airlift unit. On 1 April 1953, the 514th Wing returned to the reserves, replacing the 65th Wing, and the 336th Squadron was activated and absorbed the personnel and equipment of the 13th Troop Carrier Squadron. The squadron again trained with the 2233d Center, flying C-46 Commandos but it completed transition to Fairchild C-119 Flying Boxcars by August 1954. In the summer of 1956, the unit participated in Operation Sixteen Ton during its two weeks of active duty training. Sixteen Ton was performed entirely by reserve troop carrier units and moved United States Coast Guard equipment From Floyd Bennett Naval Air Station, New York to Isla Grande Airport in Puerto Rico and San Salvador in the Bahamas. After the success of this operation, the squadron began to use inactive duty training periods for Operation Swift Lift, transporting high priority cargo for the Air Force and Operation Ready Swap, transporting aircraft engines between Air Materiel Command’s depots.

In 1958, the 2233d Center was inactivated and some of its personnel were absorbed by the squadron. In place of active duty support (Note: Air reserve centers training reserve units were regular air force units.) for reserve units, ConAC adopted the Air Reserve Technician program, in which a cadre of the unit consisted of full-time personnel who were simultaneously civilian employees of the Air Force and also held military rank as members of the reserve. After 1958, the squadron increasingly participated in humanitarian and other airlift missions.

==== Dispersed squadrons ====
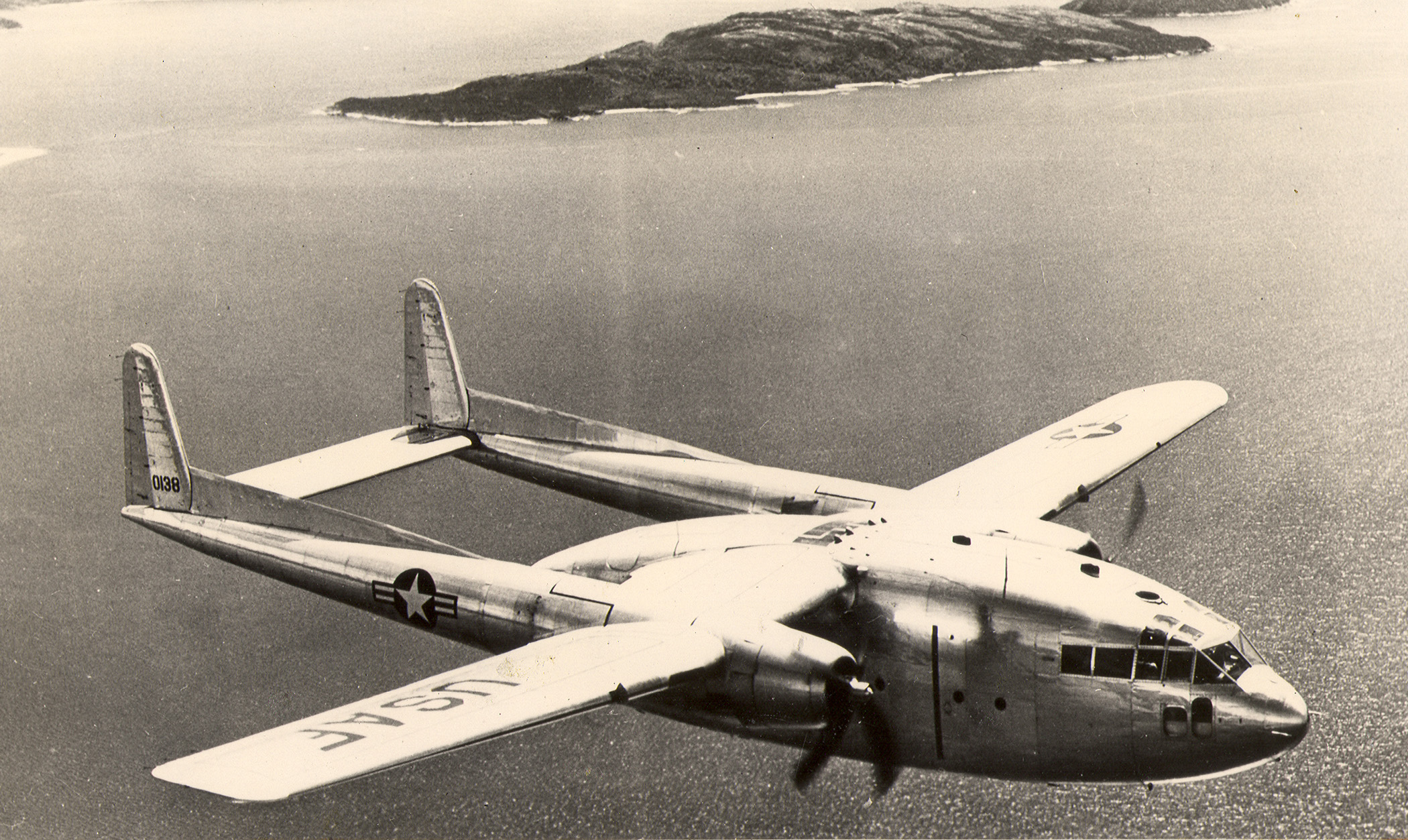
US Air Force reserve C-119

In April 1959, the 514th Wing reorganized under the Dual Deputy system. Its 514th Troop Carrier Group was inactivated and the squadron was assigned directly to the wing. Starting in late 1955, Continental Air Command (ConAC) had begun to disperse some of its reserve flying squadrons to separate bases in order to improve recruiting and avoid public objection to entire wings of aircraft being stationed near large population centers under what was called the Detached Squadron Concept. The 336th Squadron moved to Stewart Air Force Base, New York in March 1961 as part of this program.

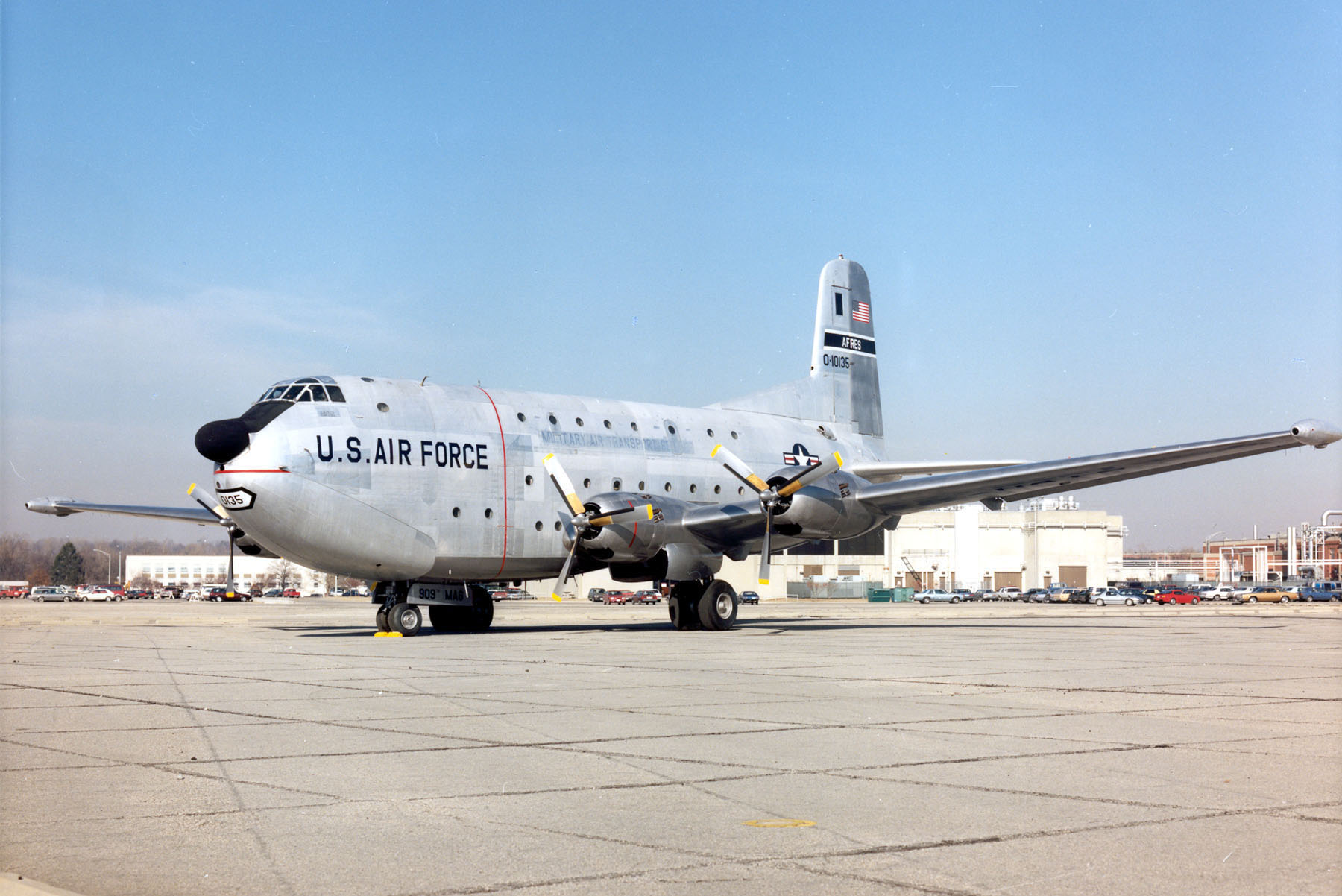
C-124 Globemaster II of the AF Reserve

Although the dispersal of flying units was not a problem when the entire wing was called to active service, mobilizing a single flying squadron and elements to support it proved difficult. This weakness was demonstrated in the partial mobilization of reserve units during the Berlin Crisis of 1961 To resolve this, at the start of 1962, ConAC determined to reorganize its reserve wings by establishing groups with support elements for each of its troop carrier squadrons. This reorganization would facilitate mobilization of elements of wings in various combinations when needed. However, as this plan was entering its implementation phase, another partial mobilization occurred for the Cuban Missile Crisis. The formation of troop carrier groups was delayed until January for wings that had not been mobilized. The 904th Troop Carrier Group became the squadron's headquarters on 17 January 1963.

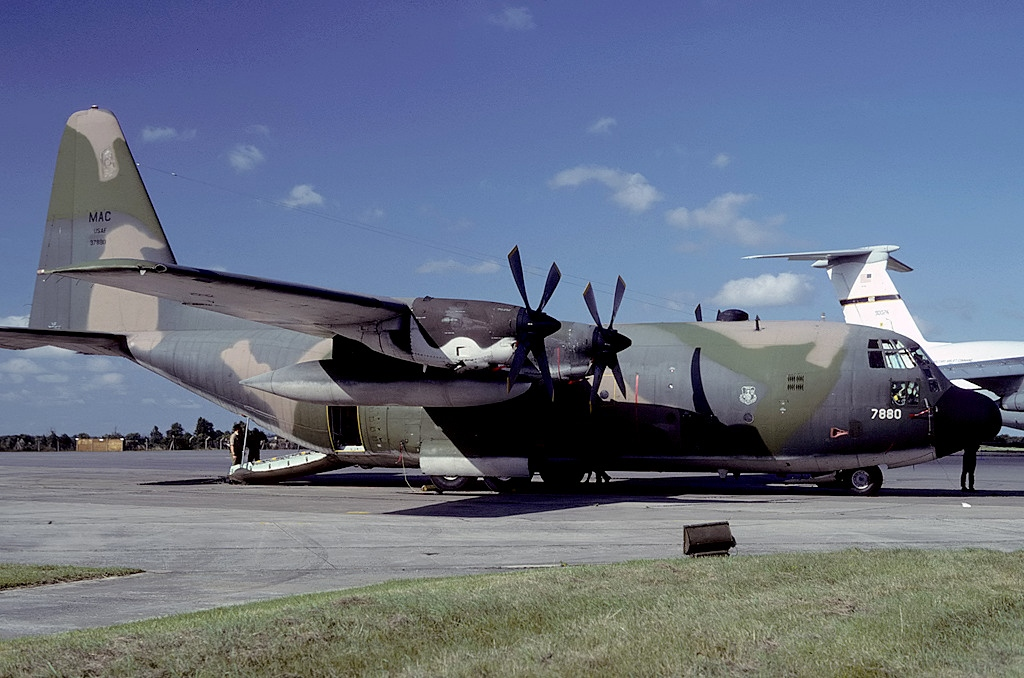
C-130E Hercules

In the fall of 1966, the squadron transition into the Douglas C-124 Globemaster II and was redesignated the 336th Military Airlift Squadron. The squadron, along with its parent 904th Group moved to Hamilton Air Force Base, California at the end of 1969 as reserve flying operations at Stewart ended. 1972 saw another name change to the 336th Tactical Airlift Squadron as the squadron transitioned into the Lockheed C-130 Hercules. The 904th Group was inactivated in 1975 as Air Force Reserve eliminated its groups located on the same bases as their parent wings to avoid duplication. The squadron was assigned directly to the 452d Tactical Airlift Wing at Hamilton.

==== Air refueling operations ====
In early 1976, the 336th moved to March Air Force Base, California. Shortly thereafter, it began to fly the Boeing KC-135 Stratotanker and became the 336th Air Refueling Squadron. It has performed air refueling worldwide since 1977.

== Lineage ==
536th Bombardment Squadron

- Constituted as the 536th Bombardment Squadron (Heavy) on 28 October 1942

Activated on 3 November 1942
Inactivated on 31 March 1944

- Consolidated with the 336th Air Refueling Squadron as the 336th Air Refueling Squadron on 19 September 1985

336th Air Refueling Squadron

- Constituted as the 336th Troop Carrier Squadron, Medium on 10 May 1949

Activated in the reserve on 26 June 1949
Ordered to active service on 1 May 1951
Inactivated on 1 February 1953
Activated in the reserve on 1 April 1953

- Redesignated 336th Military Airlift Squadron on 1 October 1966

Ordered to active service on 26 January 1968
Relieved from active service on 2 June 1969

- Redesignated 336th Tactical Airlift Squadron on 1 April 1972
- Redesignated 336th Air Refueling Squadron, Heavy on 1 October 1976
- Consolidated with the 536th Bombardment Squadron on 19 September 1985
- Redesignated 336th Air Refueling Squadron on 1 February 1992

=== Assignments ===
- 382d Bombardment Group, 3 November 1942 – 31 March 1944
- 514th Troop Carrier Group, 26 June 1949 – 1 February 1953 1953–1963)
- 514th Troop Carrier Group, 1 April 1953
- 514th Troop Carrier Wing, 14 April 1959
- 904th Troop Carrier Group, (later 904th Military Airlift group, 904th Tactical Airlift Group), 17 January 1963
- 452d Tactical Airlift Wing (later 452d Air Refueling Wing), 1 September 1975
- 452d Operations Group, 1 August 1992

=== Stations ===
- Salt Lake City Army Air Base, Utah, 3 November 1942
- Davis–Monthan Field, Arizona, 23 January 1943
- Pocatello Army Air Field, Idaho, 3 April 1943
- Muroc Army Air Field, California, 5 December 1943 – 31 March 1944
- Birmingham Municipal Airport, Alabama, 26 June 1949
- Mitchel Air Force Base, New York, 10 October 1949 – 1 February 1953
- Mitchel Air Force Base, New York, 1 April 1953
- Stewart Air Force Base, New York, 15 March 1961
- Hamilton Air Force Base, California, 31 December 1969
- March Air Force Base (later March Air Reserve Base), California, 1 January 1976 – present

=== Aircraft ===
- Consolidated B-24 Liberator (1943–1944)
- Curtiss C-46 Commando (1951–1953)
- Fairchild C-119 Flying Boxcar (1953–1966)
- Douglas C-124 Globemaster II (1966–1972)
- Lockheed C-130 Hercules (1972–1976)
- Boeing KC-135 Stratotanker (since 1976)

=== Awards and campaigns ===
Award streamer	Award	Dates	Notes
	Air Force Outstanding Unit Award	26 January 1968-31 March 1969	336th Military Airlift Squadron
	Air Force Outstanding Unit Award	1 January 1976-2 October 1977	336th Tactical Airlift Squadron (later 336th Air Refueling Squadron)
	Air Force Outstanding Unit Award	1 July 1991-30 June 1993	336th Air Refueling Squadron
	Air Force Outstanding Unit Award	1 September 1995-31 August 1996	336th Air Refueling Squadron
	Air Force Outstanding Unit Award	1 September 1997-31 August 1999	336th Air Refueling Squadron
	Air Force Outstanding Unit Award	1 October 2002-30 September 2004	336th Air Refueling Squadron
	Air Force Outstanding Unit Award	1 October 2004-30 September 2006	336th Air Refueling Squadron
	Air Force Outstanding Unit Award	1 October 2006-30 September 2008	336th Air Refueling Squadron
	Air Force Outstanding Unit Award	1 October 2008-30 September 2010	336th Air Refueling Squadron
	Vietnamese Gallantry Cross with Palm	1 October 1966-31 March 1972	336th Military Airlft Squadron

.

Campaign Streamer	Campaign	Dates	Notes
	American Theater without inscription	3 November 1942 – 31 March 1944	536th Bombardment Squadron
