= 905th Tactical Airlift Group =

905th Military Airlift Group

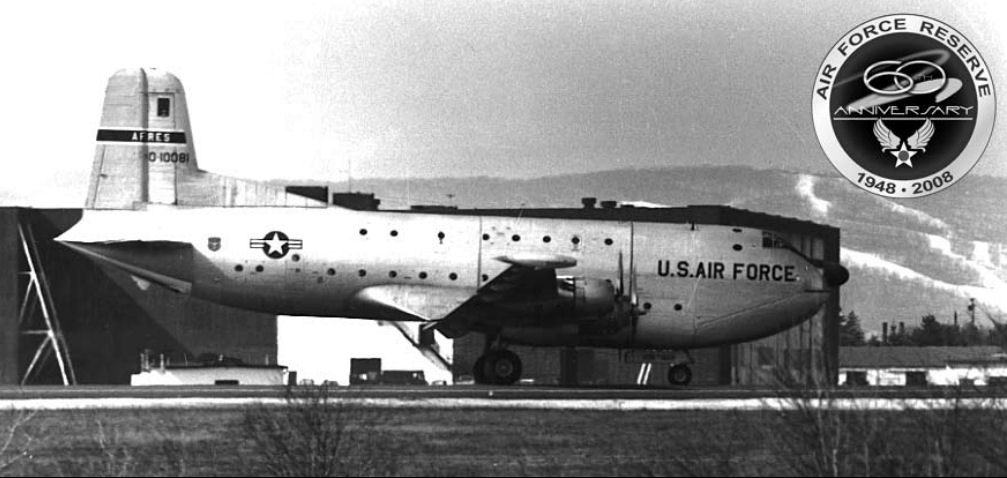
- Group C-124 Globemaster II at Westover AFB (Note: Aircraft is C-124C-DL Globemaster II serial 51–81, circa 1972.)
- Active: 1963–1974
- Country: United States
- Branch: United States Air Force
- Role: Airlift

The 905th Military Airlift Group is an inactive United States Air Force Reserve unit. It was last active with the 459th Military Airlift Wing at Westover Air Force Base, Massachusetts, where it was inactivated on 1 April 1974.

== History ==
=== Need for reserve troop carrier groups ===
During the first half of 1955, the Air Force began detaching Air Force Reserve squadrons from their parent wing locations to separate sites. The concept offered several advantages. Communities were more likely to accept the smaller squadrons than the large wings and the location of separate squadrons in smaller population centers would facilitate recruiting and manning. Continental Air Command (ConAC)'s plan called for placing Air Force Reserve units at fifty-nine installations located throughout the United States. When these relocations were completed in 1959, reserve wing headquarters and wing support elements would typically be on one base, along with one (or in some cases two) of the wing's flying squadrons, while the remaining flying squadrons were spread over thirty-five Air Force, Navy and civilian airfields under what was called the Detached Squadron Concept.

Although this dispersal was not a problem when the entire wing was called to active service, mobilizing a single flying squadron and elements to support it proved difficult. This weakness was demonstrated in the partial mobilization of reserve units during the Berlin Crisis of 1961 To resolve this, at the start of 1962, Continental Air Command, (ConAC) determined to reorganize its reserve wings by establishing groups with support elements for each of its troop carrier squadrons. This reorganization would facilitate mobilization of elements of wings in various combinations when needed. However, as this plan was entering its implementation phase, another partial mobilization occurred for the Cuban Missile Crisis, with the units being released on 22 November 1962. The formation of troop carrier groups occurred in January 1963 for units that had not been mobilized, but was delayed until February for those that had been.

=== Activation of 905th Troop Carrier Group ===
As a result, the 905th Troop Carrier Group was established at Bradley Field, Connecticut on 17 January 1963, as the headquarters for the 337th Troop Carrier Squadron, which had been stationed there since November 1957. Along with group headquarters, a Combat Support Squadron, Materiel Squadron and a Tactical Infirmary were organized to support the 337th.

The group mission was to organize, recruit and train Air Force Reserve personnel in the tactical airlift of airborne forces, their equipment and supplies and delivery of these forces and materials by airdrop, landing or cargo extraction systems. The group was equipped with Fairchild C-119 Flying Boxcars for Tactical Air Command airlift operations.

The 905th TCG was one of three C-119 groups assigned to the 514th TCW in 1963, the others being the 903d Troop Carrier Group at McGuire Air Force Base, New Jersey and 904th Troop Carrier Group at Stewart Air Force Base, New York.

Reassigned to Military Airlift Command, 1966, trained and re-equipped with C-124 Globemaster II intercontinental transports. Began flying worldwide airlift missions. Inactivated with retirement of C-124 in April 1974.

== Lineage ==
- Established as the 905th Troop Carrier Group, Medium and activated on 28 December 1962 (not organized)

Organized in the Reserve on 17 January 1963
Redesignated 905th Military Airlift Group on 1 April 1966
Redesignated 905th Tactical Airlift Group on 1 April 1972
Inactivated on 1 April 1974

=== Assignments ===
- Continental Air Command, 28 December 1962 (not organized)
- 514th Troop Carrier Wing, 17 January 1963
- 94th Tactical Airlift Wing, 1 July 1966
- 459th Military Airlift Wing, 25 February 1972 – 1 April 1974

=== Components ===
- 337th Troop Carrier Squadron (later 337th Tactical Airlift Squadron, 337th Military Airlift Squadron), 17 January 1963 – 1 April 1974

=== Stations ===
- Bradley Field, Connecticut, 17 January 1963 – 1 April 1966
- Westover Air Force Base, Massachusetts, 1 April 1966 – 1 April 1974

=== Aircraft ===
- Fairchild C-119 Flying Boxcar, 1963–1966
- Douglas C-124 Globemaster II, 1966–1974
