= 337th Airlift Squadron =

337th Airlift Squadron

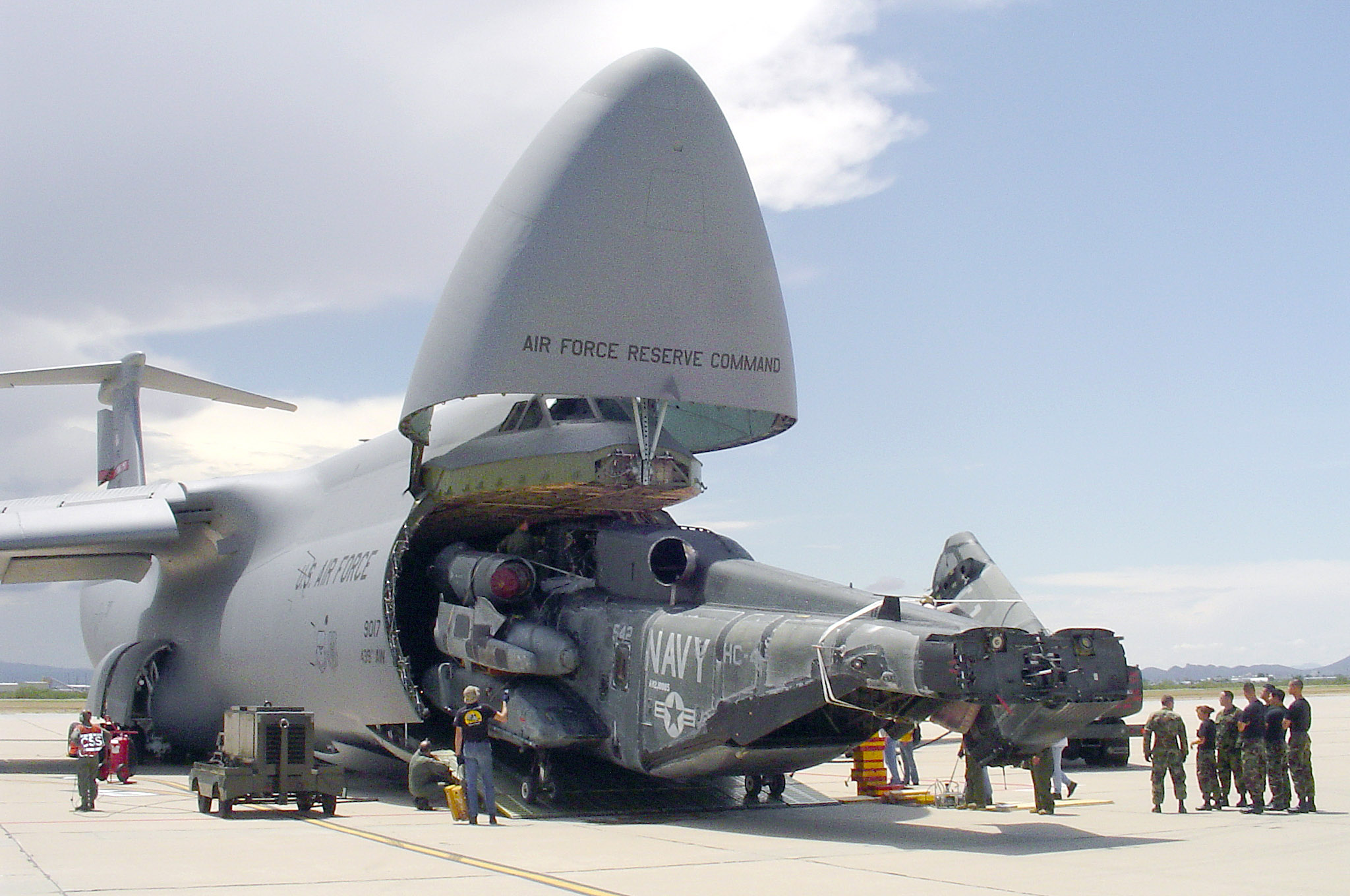
- A 337th C-5A Galaxy loading a US Navy CH-53 Super Stallion at Davis-Monthan AFB in 2005
- Active: 1949-1953; 1953-1957; 1958-present
- Country: United States
- Branch: United States Air Force
- Role: Airlift
- Part of: Air Force Reserve Command
- Garrison/HQ: Westover Air Reserve Base
- Mottos: Non Ducor Duco Latin I Am Not Led, I Lead
- Engagements: Operation Just Cause
- Decorations: Air Force Outstanding Unit Award; Republic of Vietnam Gallantry Cross with Palm

Insignia
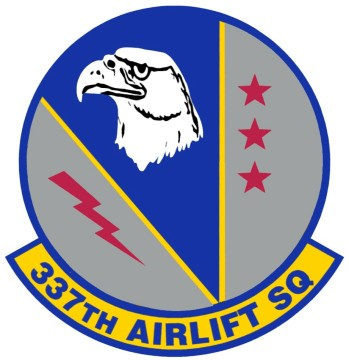
- 337th Airlift Squadron emblem (approved 11 July 1996)

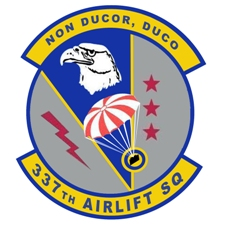
- 337th Airlift Squadron emblem (c. 1994) (Note: This emblem was originally approved for the 337th Troop Carrier Squadron on a shield. It was later placed on a disc to comply with requirements for squadron emblems.)

Aircraft flown
- Transport: C-5M Super Galaxy

The 337th Airlift Squadron is a United States Air Force Reserve squadron, part of the 439th Airlift Wing at Westover Air Reserve Base, Massachusetts. It operates C-5M Super Galaxy aircraft supporting the United States Air Force global reach mission worldwide. If mobilized, the wing is gained by Air Mobility Command.

== Mission ==
The 337th Airlift Squadron airlifted U.S. airborne forces, military equipment and supplies as needed during Korean War, 1951–1953. The squadron also flew airlift missions worldwide, 1953–1989. At the end of 1989, it took part in Operation Just Cause, flying troops and equipment to Panama.

== History ==
The 337th was constituted as 337 Troop Carrier Squadron, Medium on 10 May 1949. Activated in the Reserve on 26 June 1949 at Birmingham Municipal Airport, Alabama. Ordered to active service on 1 May 1951. Inactivated on 1 February 1953. Activated in the Reserve on 1 April 1953.

The 337th served on active duty within the United States during Korean War from, 1951–1953, airlifting U.S. airborne forces and military equipment and supplies as needed. Inactivated on 1 July 1957. Activated in the Reserve on 8 July 1958. Relocated to Westover AFB (later, ARB), MA, redesignated 337th Military Airlift Squadron on 1 Apr 1966; 337 Tactical Airlift Squadron on 1 April 1972.

Redesignated 337th Military Airlift Squadron on 1 Oct 1987. At the end of 1989, the 337th took part in Operation Just Cause, flying troops and equipment to Panama. Redesignated 337th Airlift Squadron on 1 February 1992. They provide communications, engineering, logistical, medical and security requirement.

The group received its first C-5M Super Galaxy on 2 June 2017. Marking the first of eight for the unit. On 7 September 2017 the unit's last C-5A left Westover for Davis-Monthan Air Force Base, Arizona for retirement.

== Lineage ==
- Constituted as the 337th Troop Carrier Squadron, Medium on 10 May 1949

Activated in the reserve on 26 June 1949
Ordered to active service on 1 May 1951
Inactivated on 1 February 1953

- Activated in the reserve on 1 April 1953

Inactivated on 1 July 1957.

- Activated in the reserve on 8 July 1958

Redesignated 337th Military Airlift Squadron on 1 April 1966
Redesignated 337th Tactical Airlift Squadron on 1 April 1972
Redesignated 337th Military Airlift Squadron on 1 October 1987
Redesignated 337th Airlift Squadron on 1 February 1992

=== Assignments ===
- 514th Troop Carrier Group, 26 June 1949 – 1 February 1953
- 514th Troop Carrier Group, 1 April 1953 – 1 July 1957
- 514th Troop Carrier Group, 8 Jul 1958
- 514th Troop Carrier Wing, 14 April 1959
- 905th Troop Carrier Group (later 905th Military Airlift Group, 905th Tactical Airlift Group), 17 Jan 1963
- 439th Tactical Airlift Wing (later 439th Military Airlift Wing 439th Airlift Wing), 1 April 1974
- 439th Operations Group, 1 August 1992 – present

=== Stations ===
- Birmingham Municipal Airport, Alabama, 26 June 1949
- Mitchel Air Force Base, New York, 10 October 1949 – 1 February 1953
- Mitchel Air Force Base, New York, 1 April 1953 – 1 July 1957
- Bradley Field, Connecticut, 8 July 1958
- Westover Air Force Base (later Westover Air Reserve Base), Massachusetts, 1 April 1966 – present

=== Aircraft ===
- Curtiss C-46 Commando (1949–1953, 1953–1954)
- Fairchild C-119 Flying Boxcar (1952–1953, 1954–1957, 1958–1965)
- Douglas C-124 Globemaster II (1965–1970, 1970–1974)
- Lockheed C-130 Hercules (1974–1988)
- Lockheed C-5 Galaxy (1987–2017)
- Lockheed C-5M Super Galaxy (2017–present)
