= 411th Bombardment Group =

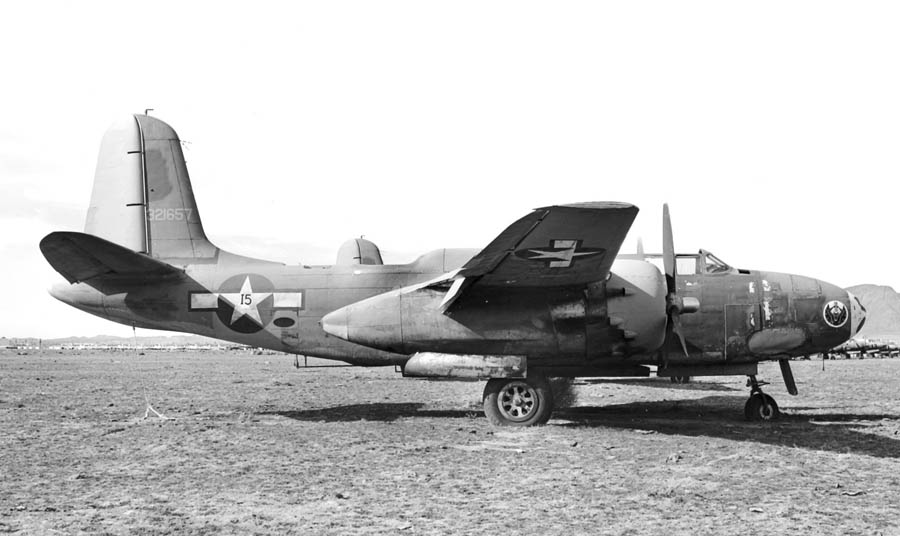
- A-20G of the 650th Bombardment Squadron (Note: Aircraft is Douglas A-20G-40-DO serial 43-21657. Note the squadron emblem on the nose.)
- Active: 1943–1944
- Country: United States
- Branch: United States Air Force
- Role: Light Bombardment Replacement Training Unit
- Part of: Third Air Force

The 411th Bombardment Group is an inactive United States Army Air Forces unit. Its last assignment was with III Bomber Command at Florence Army Air Field, South Carolina, where it served as a Replacement Training Unit until it was disbanded on 1 May 1944. In July 1985, the group was reconstituted as the 411th Tactical Missile Wing, but has never been active under that name.

== History ==
The 411th Bombardment Group was activated at Will Rogers Field, Oklahoma on 1 August 1943. Its original squadrons were the 648th, 649th, 650th and 651st Bombardment Squadrons. Two weeks later it moved to Florence Army Air Field, South Carolina, where it absorbed the personnel of the 65th Reconnaissance Group, which had been training observation crews on North American B-25 Mitchell aircraft there.

The group was a World War II Replacement Training Unit, using Douglas A-20 Havoc light bombers. Replacement Training Units were oversized units that trained individual aircrews. After graduating, the airmen were assigned to overseas combat units.

However, standard military units, based on relatively inflexible tables of organization were proving poorly adapted to the training mission. Accordingly, the Army Air Forces adopted a more functional system in which each base was organized into a separate numbered unit. The group was disbanded on 1 May 1944 and its mission, personnel and equipment were transferred to the 334th Army Air Forces Base Unit (Replacement Training Unit, Light Bombardment).

On 31 July 1985 the group was reconstituted and redesignated the 411th Tactical Missile Wing, but was not activated.

== Lineage ==
- Constituted as 411th Bombardment Group (Light) on 14 July 1943

Activated on 1 August 1943
Disbanded on 1 May 1944

- Reconstituted on 31 July 1985 and redesignated 411th Tactical Missile Wing

=== Assignments ===
- III Bomber Command, 1 August 1943
- I Tactical Air Division, August 1943 – 1 May 1944

=== Components ===
- 648th Bombardment Squadron: 1 August 1943 – 1 May 1944
- 649th Bombardment Squadron: 1 August 1943 – 1 May 1944
- 650th Bombardment Squadron: 1 August 1943 – 1 May 1944
- 651st Bombardment Squadron: 1 August 1943 – 1 May 1944

=== Stations ===
- Will Rogers Field, Oklahoma, 1 August 1943
- Florence Army Air Field, South Carolina, 15 August 1943 – 1 May 1944

=== Aircraft ===
- Douglas A-20 Havoc, 1943–1944
- North American B-25 Mitchell, 1943–1944

== See also ==
- List of Douglas A-20 Havoc operators
