= 903d Military Airlift Group =

903d Military Airlift Group

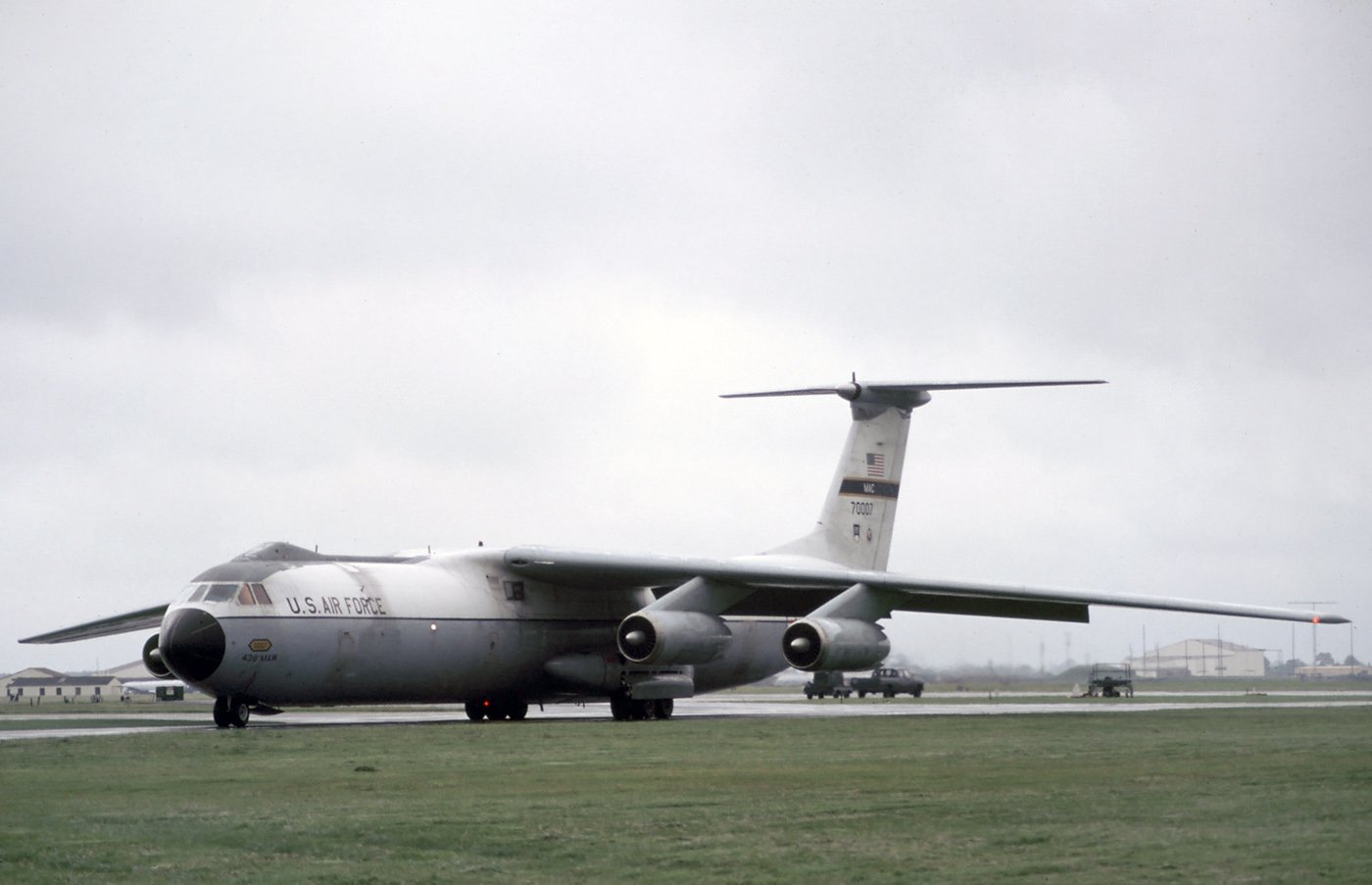
- C-141 Starlifter from McGuire Air Force Base
- Active: 1962–1973
- Country: United States
- Branch: United States Air Force
- Role: Airlift
- Part of: Air Force Reserve

Insignia
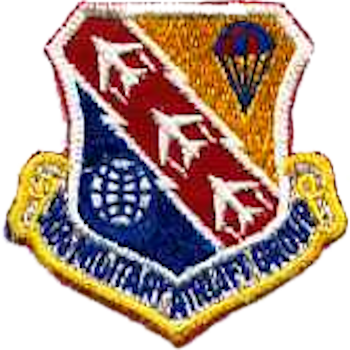
- 903d Military Airlift Group emblem

The 903d Military Airlift Group is an inactive United States Air Force Reserve unit. It was last active with the 514th Military Airlift Wing at McGuire Air Force Base, New Jersey, where it was inactivated on 1 July 1973.

== History ==
=== Need for reserve troop carrier groups ===
During the first half of 1955, the Air Force began detaching Air Force Reserve squadrons from their parent wing locations to separate sites. The concept offered several advantages. Communities were more likely to accept the smaller squadrons than the large wings and the location of separate squadrons in smaller population centers would facilitate recruiting and manning. Continental Air Command (ConAC)'s plan called for placing Air Force Reserve units at fifty-nine installations located throughout the United States. When these relocations were completed in 1959, reserve wing headquarters and wing support elements would typically be on one base, along with one (or in some cases two) of the wing's flying squadrons, while the remaining flying squadrons were spread over thirty-five Air Force, Navy and civilian airfields under what was called the Detached Squadron Concept.

Although this dispersal was not a problem when the entire wing was called to active service, mobilizing a single flying squadron and elements to support it proved difficult. This weakness was demonstrated in the partial mobilization of reserve units during the Berlin Crisis of 1961 To resolve this, at the start of 1962, Continental Air Command, (ConAC) determined to reorganize its reserve wings by establishing groups with support elements for each of its troop carrier squadrons. This reorganization would facilitate mobilization of elements of wings in various combinations when needed. However, as this plan was entering its implementation phase, another partial mobilization occurred for the Cuban Missile Crisis, with the units being released on 22 November 1962. The formation of troop carrier groups occurred in January 1963 for units that had not been mobilized, but was delayed until February for those that had been.

=== Activation of 903d Troop Carrier Group ===
As a result, the 903d Troop Carrier Group was established at McGuire Air Force Base, New Jersey on 17 January 1963, as the headquarters for the 335th Troop Carrier Squadron, which had been stationed there since March 1961. Along with group headquarters, a Combat Support Squadron, Materiel Squadron and a Tactical Infirmary were organized to support the 335th.

The group mission was to organize, recruit and train Air Force Reserve personnel in the tactical airlift of airborne forces, their equipment and supplies and delivery of these forces and materials by airdrop, landing or cargo extraction systems. The group was equipped with C-119 Flying Boxcars for Tactical Air Command airlift operations.

The 903d was one of three C-119 groups assigned to the 514th TCW in 1963, the others being the 904th Troop Carrier Group at Stewart AFB, New York and 905th Troop Carrier Group at Bradley Field, Connecticut.

In 1970, was re-aligned to Military Airlift Command, becoming reserve C-141 Starlifter intercontinental heavy-lift transport group along with the assigned 943d Troop Carrier Group at Dover AFB, Delaware. Inactivated in 1973 as part of the drawdown of forces after the Vietnam War.

== Lineage ==
- Established as 903d Troop Carrier Group, Medium and activated on 28 December 1962 (not organized)

Organized in the Reserve on 17 January 1963
Redesignated 903d Tactical Airlift Group on 1 July 1967
Redesignated 903d Military Airlift Group (Associate) on 25 September 1968
Inactivated on 1 July 1973

=== Assignments ===
- Continental Air Command, 28 December 1963 (not organized)
- 514th Troop Carrier Wing (later 514th Tactical Airlift Wing, 514th Military Airlift Wing), 17 January 1963 – 1 July 1973

=== Components ===
- 335th Troop Carrier Squadron (later 335th Tactical Airlift Squadron Military Airlift Squadron), 17 January 1963 – 1 April 1970
- 732d Military Airlift Squadron, 1 April 1970 – 1 July 1973

=== Stations ===
- McGuire Air Force Base, New Jersey, 17 January 1963 – 1 July 1973

=== Aircraft ===
- Fairchild C-119 Flying Boxcar, 1963–1970
- Lockheed C-141 Starlifter, 1970–1973
