= 335th Airlift Squadron =

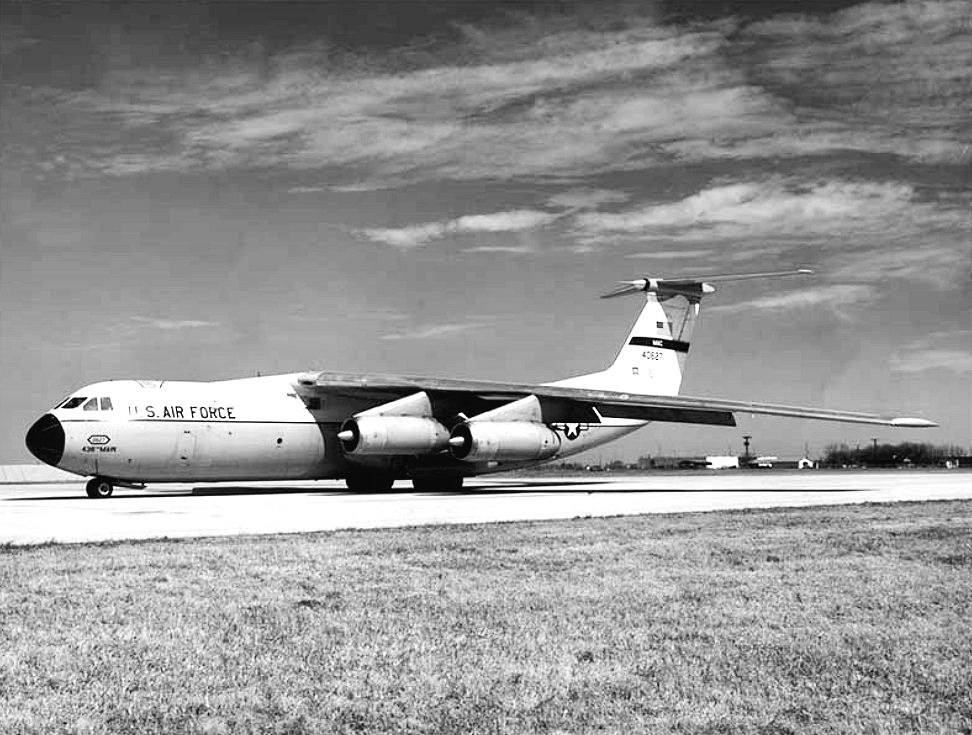
- C-141 of the 438th Military Airlift Wing (Note: This aircraft, Lockheed C-141 serial 64-627, was flown by the squadron as an associate unit of the 438th. Picture taken in 1973.)
- Active: 1949–1952; 1953–1970; 1973–1995
- Country: United States
- Branch: United States Air Force
- Role: Airlift

Insignia
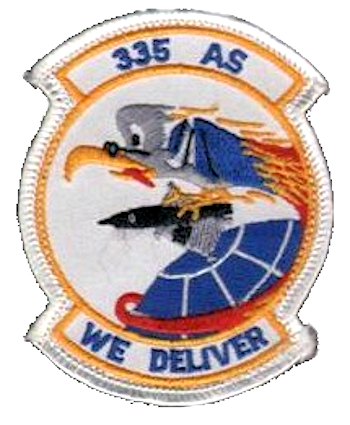
- 335th Airlift Squadron emblem

The 335th Airlift Squadron is an inactive United States Air Force Reserve unit. It was last active with the 514th Operations Group at McGuire Air Force Base, New Jersey, where it was inactivated on 30 September 1995

The squadron was first organized in 1949 as the 335th Troop Carrier Squadron. It trained with Curtiss C-46 Commando aircraft and was called to active duty for the Korean War until 1953, when it returned to reserve duty.

== History ==
=== Activation in the reserve and mobilization ===
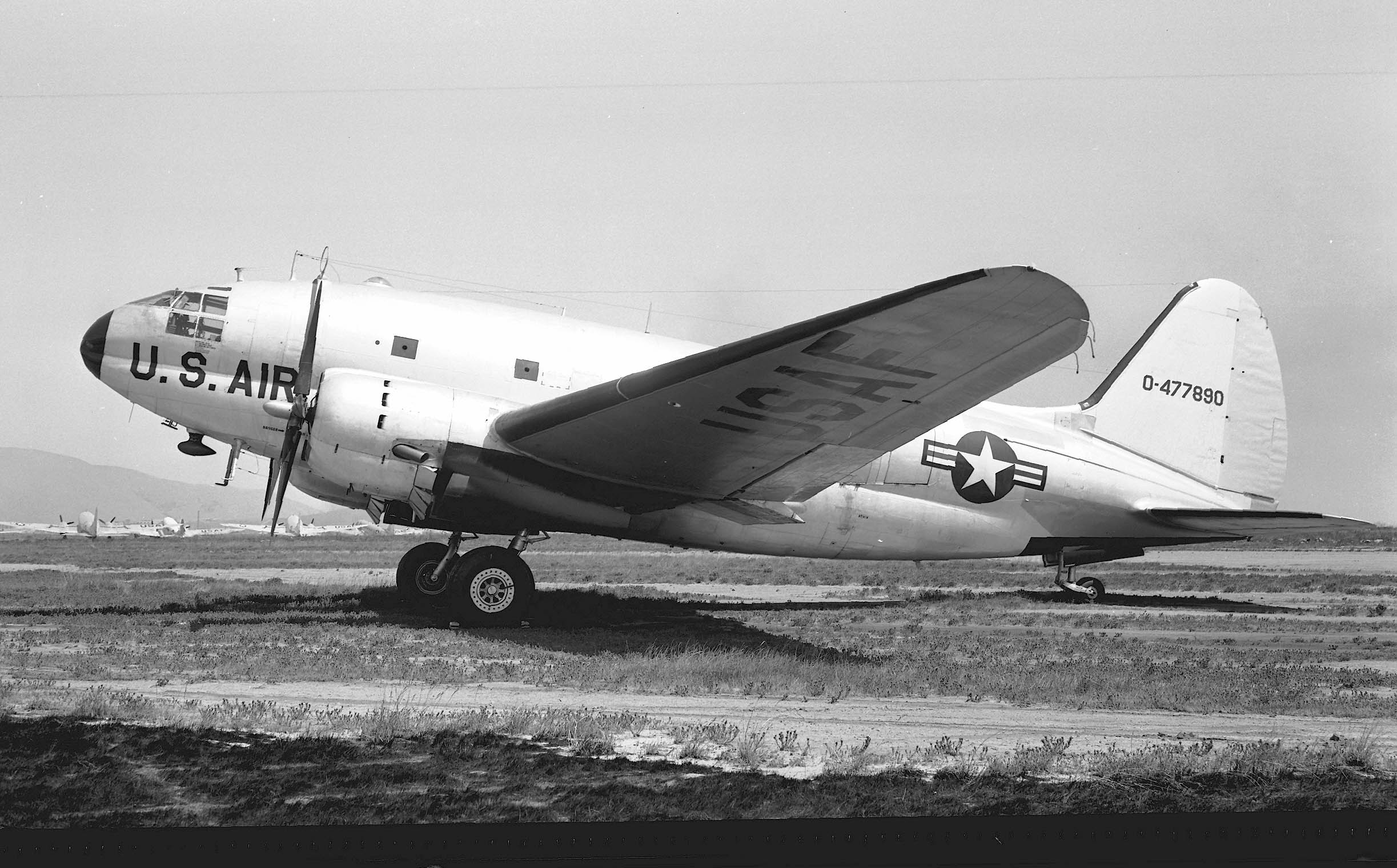
C-46 as flown by the 335th Troop Carrier Squadron (Note: Aircraft is Curtiss C-46D Commando serial 44-77890.)

The squadron was first activated at Birmingham Municipal Airport in June 1949, when it replaced the 323d Troop Carrier Squadron in the 514th Troop Carrier Group as part of a reorganization of reserve units by Continental Air Command (ConAC) to implement the wing base organization. There, it began training under the supervision of the 2587th Air Force Reserve Training Center. However, ConAC decided that Birmingham would be home to a light bomber unit and in October, the 514th Troop Carrier Wing was replaced by the 319th Bombardment Wing. The 335th moved with its parent wing on paper to Mitchel Air Force Base, where it was partially manned by reservists of the 84th Fighter Wing, which departed Mitchel the same day.

At Mitchel, the squadron equipped with Curtiss C-46 Commando transports and began training with the 2233d Air Force Reserve Training Center. The squadron was called to active duty for the Korean War on 1 May 1951 and participated in airlift operations and exercises. It transported troops and cargo and dropped paratroopers until 1 February 1953, when it was relieved from active duty and turned its personnel and equipment over to the 29th Troop Carrier Squadron, which replaced it as the active duty troop carrier wing at Mitchel. Shortly before inactivation, the squadron began to convert to the Fairchild C-119 Flying Boxcar.

=== Return to the reserves ===
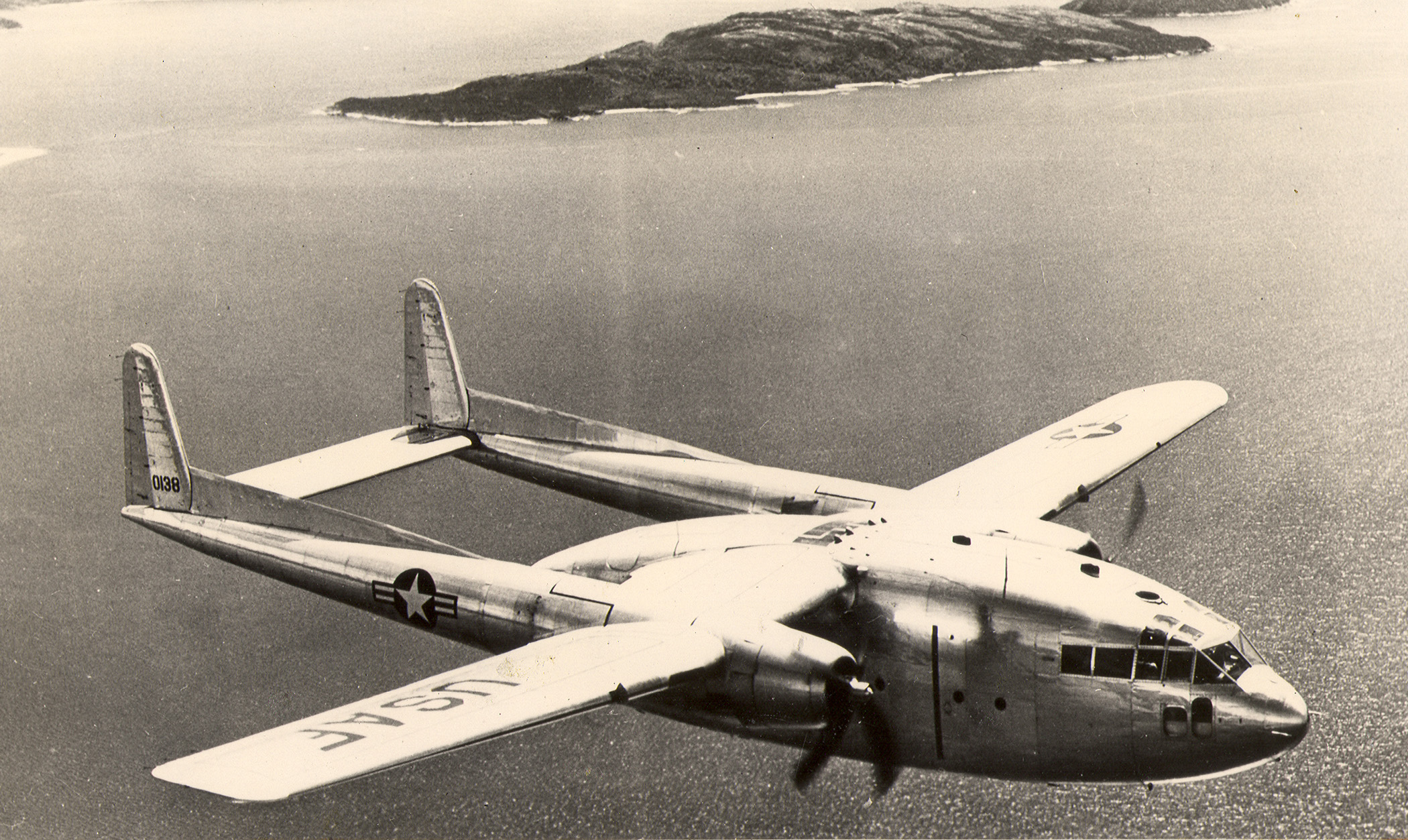
Air reserve C-119 (Note: Aircraft is Fairchild C-119C-19-FA Flying Boxcar serial 50–138.)

Two months later, the squadron was activated again in the reserves, taking over the resources of the partially manned 2d Troop Carrier Squadron, part of the 65th Troop Carrier Wing, which had been activated at Mitchel to train reservists who had completed their Korean War tours of active duty. Its return to the reserves was accompanied by a return to flying the Curtiss Commando, but by August 1954 was once again flying the C-119, becoming part of the first reserve wing to operate the Flying Boxcar. It initially trained with the 2233d Air Reserve Flying Center, but in 1958, the center was inactivated and some of its personnel were absorbed by the squadron. In place of active duty support for reserve units, ConAC adopted the Air Reserve Technician program, in which a cadre of the unit consisted of full-time personnel who were simultaneously civilian employees of the Air Force and held rank as members of the reserves.

In the summer of 1956, the squadron participated in Operation Sixteen Ton during its two weeks of active duty training. Sixteen Ton was performed entirely by reserve troop carrier units and moved United States Coast Guard equipment from Floyd Bennett Naval Air Station to Isla Grande Airport in Puerto Rico and San Salvador Island in the Bahamas. After the success of this operation, the squadron began to use inactive duty training periods (Note: These were two-day periods, typically on weekends, when the squadron trained without the entire unit being called up, giving rise to the term "weekend warrior.") for Operation Swift Lift, transporting high priority cargo for the air force and Operation Ready Swap, transporting aircraft engines, between Air Materiel Command’s depots.

In 1959, the reserves adopted the dual deputy organization (Note: Under this plan flying [and missile] squadrons reported to the wing Deputy Commander for Operations and maintenance squadrons reported to the wing Deputy Commander for Maintenance.) and the squadron was assigned directly to the 514th Troop Carrier Wing when the 514th Group was inactivated. At this time, the reserve flying force consisted of 45 troop carrier squadrons assigned to 15 troop carrier wings. The squadrons were not all located with their parent wings, but were spread over thirty-five Air Force, Navy and civilian airfields under what was called the Detached Squadron Concept. However, under this concept, support organizations remained with the wing. The squadron was the only one of the 514th Wing's three flying squadrons that moved to McGuire Air Force Base with wing headquarters in 1961 as the Detached Squadron Concept was implemented.

Although this concept was not a problem if an entire wing was called to active service, mobilizing a single flying squadron and elements to support it proved difficult. To resolve this, at the start of 1962 ConAC determined to reorganize its reserve wings by establishing troop carrier groups with support elements for each of its troop carrier squadrons. This reorganization would facilitate mobilization of elements of wings in various combinations when needed. However, the mobilization of a number of reserve wings for the Cuban Missile Crisis delayed this reorganization until 1963. On 17 January, the 903d Troop Carrier Group and support elements were activated at McGuire and the squadron was reassigned to the new group. In 1967, along with other troop carrier units, the squadron was renamed the 335th Tactical Airlift Squadron. It was inactivated in April 1970 as part of the phaseout of Flying Boxcars.

=== Associate unit ===
The squadron was redesignated the 335th Military Airlift Squadron and reactivated in July 1973 at McGuire as an associate unit of the active duty 438th Military Airlift Wing. The associate unit program began in 1968 when the obsolete Douglas C-124 Globemaster II, still flown by the reserves, was retired. The Air Force Reserve (AFRES) formed associate units, which flew and maintained aircraft owned by the associated regular unit, to carry out its share of the strategic airlift mission. The 335th flew the Lockheed C-141 Starlifter heavy transport aircraft owned by the 438th Wing. The squadron performed worldwide airlift of personnel, equipment and supplies.

The squadron was assigned to the 903d Military Airlift Group until 1973, when AFRES inactivated its groups located on bases where a wing was also stationed, and the squadron was once again assigned directly to the 514th Wing. When the Objective Wing organization was implemented in 1992, the squadron was reassigned to its original unit, which was now titled the 514th Operations Group. The 335th was inactivated in September 1995 as the C-141 was phased out of operation with the active duty force.

== Lineage ==
- Constituted as the 335th Troop Carrier Squadron, Medium on 10 May 1949

Organized on 26 June 1949
Ordered to Active Service on 1 May 1951
Inactivated on 1 February 1953

- Activated in the Reserve on 1 April 1953

Redesignated 335th Tactical Airlift Squadron on 1 July 1967
Redesignated 335th Military Airlift Squadron (Associate) on 25 September 1968
Inactivated on 1 April 1970

- Reactivated on 1 July 1973

Redesignated 335th Airlift Squadron on 1 February 1992
Inactivated on 30 September 1995

=== Assignments ===
- 514th Troop Carrier Group, 26 June 1949 – 1 February 1953
- 514th Troop Carrier Group, 1 April 1953
- 514th Troop Carrier Wing, 14 April 1959 – 17 January 1963
- 903d Troop Carrier Group (later 903d Tactical Airlift Group), 17 January 1963 – 1 April 1970
- 514th Military Airlift Wing, 1 July 1973
- 514th Operations Group, 1 August 1992 – 30 September 1995

=== Stations ===
- Birmingham Municipal Airport, Alabama, 26 June 1949
- Mitchel Air Force Base, New York, 10 October 1949 – 1 February 1953
- Mitchel Air Force Base, New York, 1 April 1953
- McGuire Air Force Base, New York, 15 March 1961 – 1 April 1970
- McGuire Air Force Base, New Jersey, 1 July 1973 – 30 September 1995

=== Aircraft ===
- Unknown, 1949–1950
- Curtiss C-46 Commando, 1951–1953, 1953–1954
- Fairchild C-119 Flying Boxcar, 1952–1953, 1954–1970
- Lockheed C-141 Starlifter, 1970–1995
