= 514 =

Calendar year

514 in various calendars
- Gregorian calendar: 514; DXIV
- Ab urbe condita: 1267
- Assyrian calendar: 5264
- Balinese saka calendar: 435–436
- Bengali calendar: −80 – −79
- Berber calendar: 1464
- Buddhist calendar: 1058
- Burmese calendar: −124
- Byzantine calendar: 6022–6023
- Chinese calendar: 癸巳年 (Water Snake); 3211 or 3004 — to — 甲午年 (Wood Horse); 3212 or 3005
- Coptic calendar: 230–231
- Discordian calendar: 1680
- Ethiopian calendar: 506–507
- Hebrew calendar: 4274–4275
- Hindu calendars
- Vikram Samvat: 570–571
- Shaka Samvat: 435–436
- Kali Yuga: 3614–3615
- Holocene calendar: 10514
- Iranian calendar: 108 BP – 107 BP
- Islamic calendar: 111 BH – 110 BH
- Javanese calendar: 401–402
- Julian calendar: 514; DXIV
- Korean calendar: 2847
- Minguo calendar: 1398 before ROC 民前1398年
- Nanakshahi calendar: −954
- Seleucid era: 825/826 AG
- Thai solar calendar: 1056–1057
- Tibetan calendar: ཆུ་མོ་སྦྲུལ་ལོ་ (female Water-Snake); 640 or 259 or −513 — to — ཤིང་ཕོ་རྟ་ལོ་ (male Wood-Horse); 641 or 260 or −512

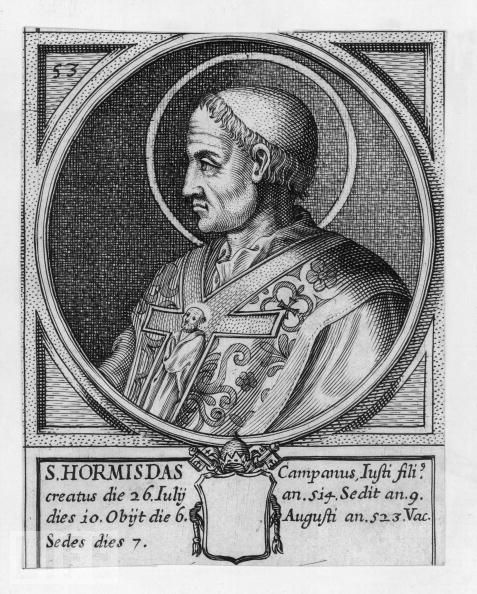
Pope Hormisdas (514–523)

Year 514 (DXIV) was a common year starting on Wednesday of the Julian calendar. At the time, it was known as the Year of the Consulship of Cassiodorus without colleague (or, less frequently, year 1267 Ab urbe condita). The denomination 514 for this year has been used since the early medieval period, when the Anno Domini calendar era became the prevalent method in Europe for naming years.

== Events ==
=== By place ===
==== Byzantine Empire ====
- Vitalian, Byzantine general, marches again to Constantinople. A fleet of 200 vessels sails from the Black Sea ports and blockades the entrance of the harbor capital. Emperor Anastasius I is disquieted by riots in the city, which cost many casualties, and decides to negotiate with Vitalian.
- Vitalian accepts the receipt of ransom money and gifts worth 5,000 pounds of gold for the release of Hypatius, a nephew of Anastasius I who has been a prisoner since the attack at Acris (see 513). Vitalian retreats to Lower Moesia.

==== Britannia ====
- Cissa of Sussex becomes king of the South Saxons after his father's death (approximate date).

==== Asia ====
- Beopheung becomes king of the Korean kingdom of Silla.

=== By topic ===
==== Religion ====
- July 19 – Pope Symmachus dies at Rome after a tenure of 15 years, 7 months and 27 days. He is succeeded by Hormisdas.

== Deaths ==
- July 19 – Pope Symmachus
- Aelle of Sussex, king of Sussex (approximate date)
- Jayavarman, king of Funan (Cambodia)
- Mac Nisse, bishop of Connor
