= 514th Operations Group =

514th Operations Group

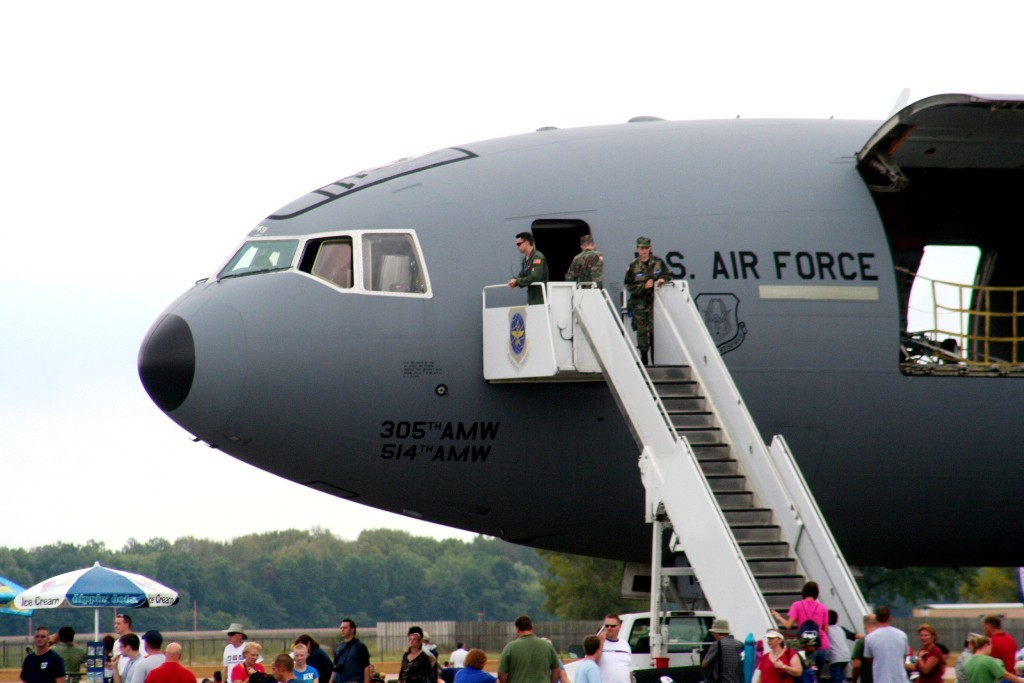
- Group KC-10 Extender on display for Scott AFB Airshow
- Active: 1944–1946; 1947–1953; 1953–1959; 1992–present
- Country: United States
- Branch: United States Air Force
- Role: Airlift and Aerial refueling
- Engagements: China-Burma-India Theater
- Decorations: Air Force Outstanding Unit Award

Insignia
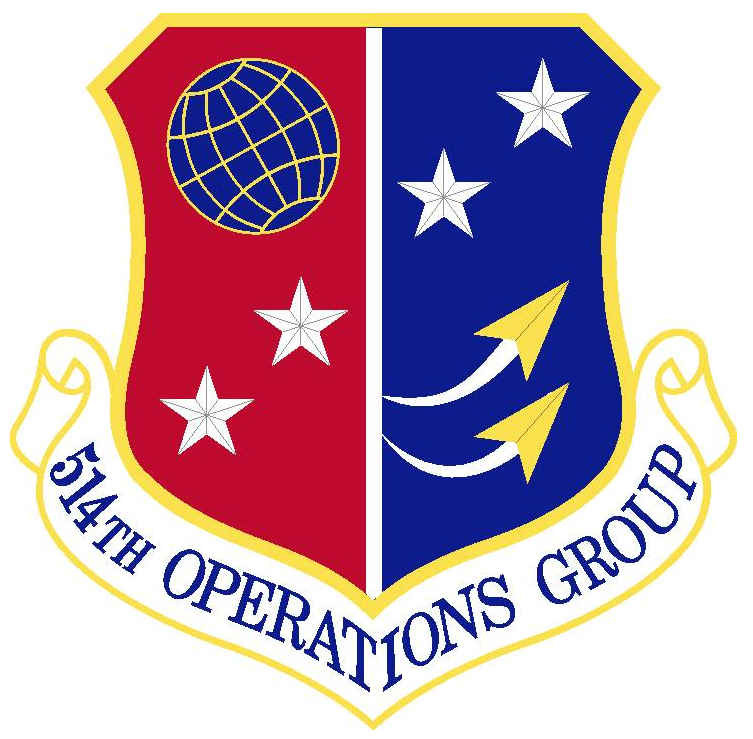
- 514th Operations Group emblem (Note: The group uses the 514th Wing emblem with the group designation on the scroll. Endicott, Factsheet 514 Operations Group (AFRC))

The 514th Operations Group is a United States Air Force Reserve unit, assigned to the 514th Air Mobility Wing. It is stationed at Joint Base McGuire-Dix-Lakehurst, New Jersey.

The first predecessor of the group was the 4th Combat Cargo Group, which served in the China-Burma-India Theater during World War II

Its second predecessor was first activated in the reserve in 1947 as the 514th Troop Carrier Group The group was called to active dute for the Korean War and served in the United States as a training unit for Curtiss C-46 Commando Aircraft. After the war, it returned to the reserve, serving until 1959, when it was inactivated as the reserves reorganized under the dual deputy concept. The group was again activated in 1992 under the United States Air Force's Objective Wing reorganization. The two groups were consolidated in 2001.

== Overview ==
The group is the flying component of the 514th Air Mobility Wing. The group flies aircraft assigned to the active-duty 305th Air Mobility Wing, also based at McGuire. The 514th shares the responsibility of maintaining and flying the McDonnell Douglas KC-10A Extender and the Boeing C-17 Globemaster III.

== Units ==
- 76th Air Refueling Squadron (KC-10 Extender)
- 78th Air Refueling Squadron (KC-10 Extender)
- 732d Airlift Squadron (C-17 Globemaster III)
- 514th Aeromedical Evacuation Squadron
- 514th Operations Support Flight
- 514th Air Mobility Operations Squadron

== History ==
The 514th trained in the U.S. with Curtiss C-46 Commando and Douglas C-47 Skytrain aircraft before moving to India in November 1944, beginning operations in early December as part of the combined Combat Cargo Task Force. It transported reinforcements and supplies for Allied forces in Burma until May 1945. Operations included moving equipment and materials for the Ledo Road in December 1944; transporting men, mules, and boats when the Allies crossed the Ayeyarwady River in February 1945; and dropping Gurkha paratroops during the assault on Rangoon in May. The group moved to Burma in June and hauled ammunition, gasoline, mules, and men to China until the war ended.

The group trained in the Reserve for troop carrier operations, May 1947 until the establishment of the wing in 1949 and from then until February 1953 first at Birmingham Municipal Airport, Alabama under supervision of the 2587th Air Force Reserve Training Center but moved without personnel or equipment to Mitchel Air Force Base, New York during its first year. The wing was ordered to active duty in May 1951. From then until February 1953, the wing performed troop carrier missions in tactical exercises and joint training operations. It operated a C-46 Commando combat crew training school from 15 September 1952 to 20 January 1953.

Activated in the Reserve in Aug 1992 to fly strategic airlift missions. Provided trained personnel to augment active force in emergencies. Personnel assigned to its squadrons participated in contingency airlift operations, some to Africa, and in training exercises. The group also began flying air refueling missions in 1994.

== Lineage ==
344th Military Airlift Group

- Established as the 4th Combat Cargo Group on 9 June 1944

Activated on 13 June 1944
Inactivated on 9 February 1946
Disestablished on 8 October 1948

- Reestablished and redesignated 344th Military Airlift Group on 31 July 1985
- Consolidated with the 514th Troop Carrier Group as the 514th Troop Carrier Group on 26 January 2001

514th Operations Group
Established as the 514th Troop Carrier Group on 13 May 1947
Activated in the reserve on 29 May 1947
Redesignated 514th Troop Carrier Group, Medium on 26 June 1949
Ordered to active service on 1 May 1951
Inactivated on 1 February 1953

- Activated in the reserve on 1 April 1953

Inactivated on 14 April 1959

- Redesignated 514th Military Airlift Group on 31 July 1985 (remained inactive)
- Redesignated 514th Operations Group on 1 August 1992 and activated in the reserve
- Consolidated with the 344th Military Airlift Group on 26 January 2001

=== Assignments ===
- I Troop Carrier Command, 13 June 1944
- Army Air Forces, India-Burma Theater, November 1944 (attached to Combat Cargo Task Force, c. 29 November 1944 – 31 May 1945, India-China Division, Air Transport Command, 15 June–13 October 1945)
- Eastern India Air Depot, 15 January-9 February 1946
- 302d Troop Carrier Wing (later 302d Air Division), 29 May 1947
- 514th Troop Carrier Wing, 26 June 1949 – 1 February 1953
- 514th Troop Carrier Wing, 1 April 1953 – 14 April 1959
- 514th Airlift Wing (later 514th Air Mobility Wing), 1 August 1992 – present

=== Components ===
World War II

- 13th Combat Cargo Squadron: 13 June 1944 – 29 December 1945
- 14th Combat Cargo Squadron: 13 June 1944 – 9 February 1946
- 15th Combat Cargo Squadron: 13 June 1944 – 29 December 1945
- 16th Combat Cargo Squadron: 13 June 1944 – 5 September 1945; 21 October–29 December 1945
- 348th Airdrome Squadron: November 1944 – c. 5 September 1945
- 349th Airdrome Squadron: November 1944 – c. 5 September 1945
- 350th Airdrome Squadron: November 1944 – c. 5 September 1945
- 351st Airdrome Squadron: November 1944 – c. 5 September 1945

Reserves

- 76th Air Refueling Squadron: 1 October 1994 – present
- 78th Air Refueling Squadron: 1 October 1994 – present
- 323d Troop Carrier Squadron: 30 September 1947 – 27 June 1949
- 324th Troop Carrier Squadron: 17 July 1947 – 27 June 1949
- 325th Troop Carrier Squadron: 15 July 1947 – 27 June 1949
- 327th Troop Carrier Squadron: 29 May 1947 – 2 September 1949
- 335th Troop Carrier Squadron (later 335th Airlift Squadron): 26 June 1949 – 1 February 1953; 1 April 1953 – 14 April 1959; 1 August 1992 – 30 September 1995
- 336th Troop Carrier Squadron: 26 June 1949 – 1 February 1953; 1 April 1953 – 14 April 1959
- 337th Troop Carrier Squadron: 26 June 1949 – 1 February 1953; 1 April 1953 – 1 July 1957; 8 July 1958 – 14 April 1959
- 338th Troop Carrier Squadron: 26 June 1949 – 2 May 1951
- 514th Operations Support Squadron (later 514th Operations Support Flight, 514th Operations Support Squadron): 1 August 1992 – present
- 702d Airlift Squadron: 1 August 1992 – 1 March 2000
- 732d Airlift Squadron, 1 August 1992 – present

=== Stations ===
- Syracuse Army Air Base, New York, 13 June 1944
- Bowman Field, Kentucky, 17 August 1944
- Baer Field, Indiana, 6–16 November 1944
- Sylhet Airfield, India, c. 28 November 1944
- Agartala Airfield, India, late December 1944
- Chittagong Airfield, India, 31 January 1945
- Namponmao Airfield, Burma, 10 June 1945
- Ondal Airfield, India, November 1945 –9 Feb 1946
- Marietta Army Air Field (later Marietta Air Force Base), Georgia, 29 May 1947
- Birmingham Municipal Airport, Alabama, 26 June 1949
- Mitchel Air Force Base, New York, 10 October 1949 – 1 February 1953
- Mitchel Air Force Base, New York, 1 April 1953 – 14 April 1959
- McGuire Air Force Base (later Joint Base McGuire-Dix-Lakehurst), New Jersey, 1 August 1992 – present

=== Aircraft ===
- Douglas C-47 Skytrain, 1944
- Curtiss C-46 Commando, 1944–1945; 1949–1951; 1953–1954
- Fairchild C-119 Flying Boxcar, 1952–1953; 1954–1959
- Lockheed C-141 Starlifter, 1992–1999
- Boeing C-17 Globemaster III, 1999–present
- McDonnell Douglas KC-10 Extender, 1994–present
- Boeing KC-46A Pegasus, Nov 2021-present
