= 514th Air Mobility Wing =

514th Airlift Wing

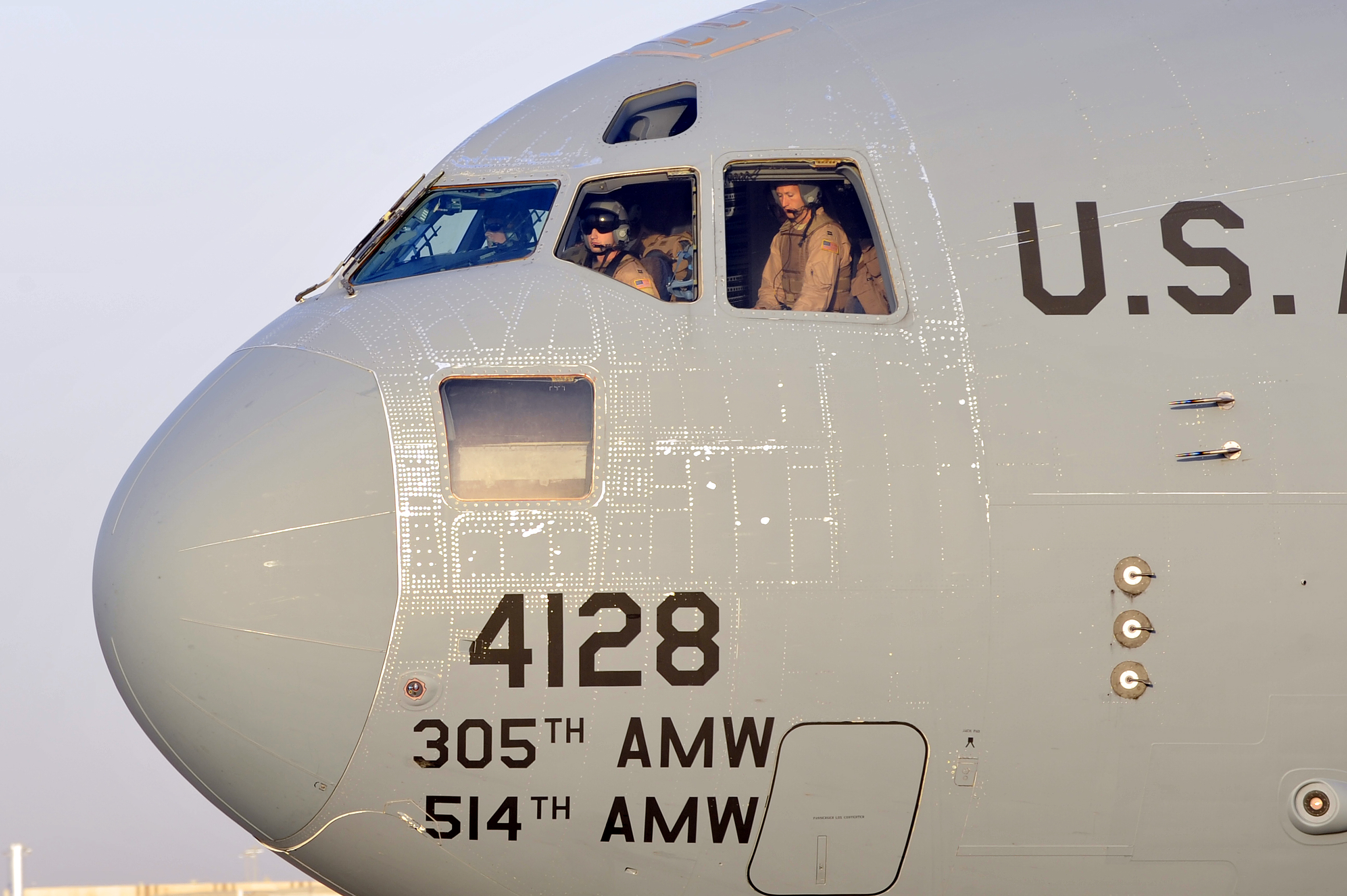
- A wing C-17 Globemaster III aircraft carrying Vice President Joe Biden arrives at Sather Air Base, Iraq
- Active: 1949–1953; 1953–present
- Country: United States
- Branch: United States Air Force
- Role: Airlift
- Part of: Air Force Reserve Command
- Garrison/HQ: McGuire Air Force Base
- Decorations: Air Force Outstanding Unit Award; Republic of Vietnam Gallantry Cross with Palm

Commanders
- Current commander: Colonel Kevin White

Insignia
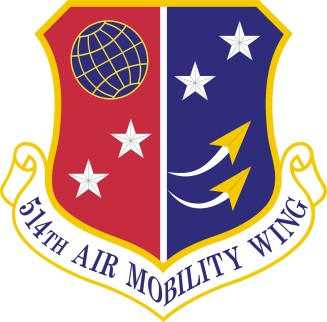
- 514th Air Mobility Wing emblem (Note: Approved 18 January 2007.)

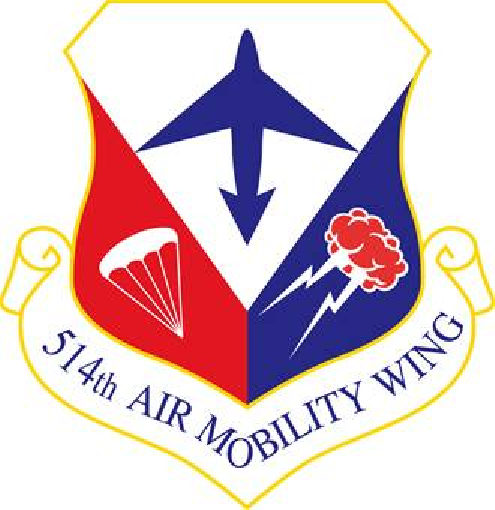
- 514th Air Mobility Wing emblem (Note: Approved 13 March 1995.)

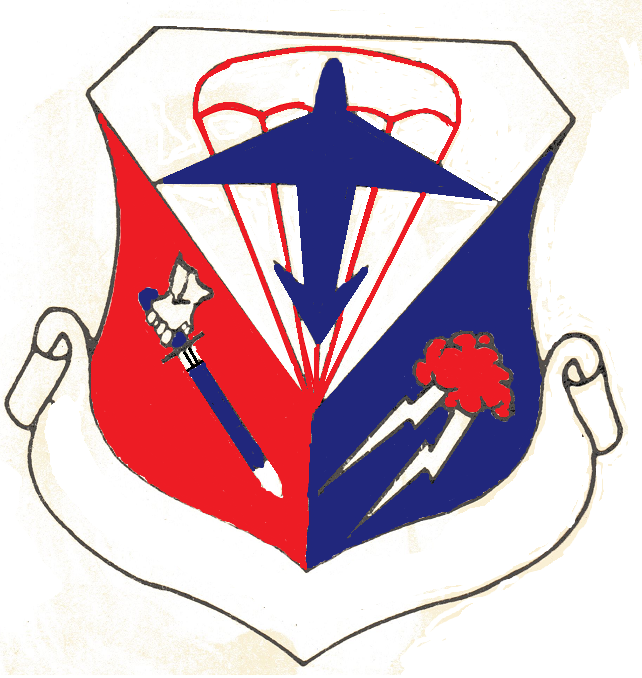
- 514th Troop Carrier Wing emblem (Note: Approved 9 September 1954. Description: per pairle abased argent, gules, and azure, in chief an outline of an open parachute of the second [color] surmounted by the silhouette of a stylized aircraft of the third [color], in dexter base a dexter hand in armor of the first [color], holding a partially drawn sword in bend of the last [color] the handle and hilt of the third [color] the sheath of the like [color] garnished of the first [color], in sinister base two lightning flashes in bend sinister of the first [color] issuing from a storm cloud of the second [color] fimbriated if the first [color].)

The 514th Airlift Wing is a wing of the United States Air Force based at the McGuire AFB element of Joint Base McGuire-Dix-Lakehurst, New Jersey. The 514th is an associate Air Force reserve unit. The wing flies aircraft assigned to the active-duty 305th Air Mobility Wing, also based at McGuire. The 514th shares the responsibility of maintaining and flying the McDonnell Douglas C-17 Globemaster III.

The wing was organized in June 1949, when Continental Air Command reorganized its reserve units under the wing base organization. It was mobilized for the Korean War, serving at its home station as part of Eighteenth Air Force, which was initially composed of reserve troop carrier units. The wing was released from active duty and inactivated in February 1953.

The wing was reactivated in April 1953. In 1968, it lost its aircraft and became an associate unit, flying and maintaining aircraft of the regular 438th Military Airlift Wing, and later of the 305th Air Mobility Wing.

== History ==
The wing was first activated at Birmingham Municipal Airport, Alabama in June 1949 as the 514th Troop Carrier Wing, assuming the resources of the 19th Air Division, while its 514th Troop Carrier Group replaced the inactivating 99th Bombardment Group. It trained under the supervision of the 2587th Air Force Reserve Training Center. Only four months after activation, it moved on paper to Mitchel Air Force Base, New York, where it replaced the 84th Fighter Wing, while the 319th Bombardment Wing assumed its personnel and equipment in Birmingham.

At Mitchel, the wing trained under the supervision of the 2233d Air Reserve Training Center until it was mobilized for the Korean War in May 1951. The wing was one of six Curtiss C-46 Commando wings mobilized for Tactical Air Command. These wings formed the basis for the formation of Eighteenth Air Force It served on active duty at Mitchel until inactivated in February 1953.

=== Troop carrier operations ===
The wing was again activated in the reserves in April 1953 and, again, trained under the 2233d Center, initially with Commandos but with Fairchild C-119 Flying Boxcars by August 1954. In the summer of 1956, the wing participated in Operation Sixteen Ton during its two weeks of active duty training. Sixteen Ton was performed entirely by reserve troop carrier units and moved United States Coast Guard equipment From Floyd Bennett Naval Air Station to Isla Grande Airport in Puerto Rico and San Salvador in the Bahamas. After the success of this operation, the wing began to use inactive duty training periods for Operation Swift Lift, transporting high priority cargo for the Air Force and Operation Ready Swap, transporting aircraft engines between Air Materiel Command's depots.

In 1958, the 2233d Center was inactivated and some of its personnel were absorbed by the wing. In place of active duty support (Note: Air reserve centers training reserve units were regular air force units.) for reserve units, ConAC adopted the Air Reserve Technician program, in which a cadre of the unit consisted of full-time personnel who were simultaneously civilian employees of the Air Force and also held military rank as members of the reserves. After 1958, the wing increasingly participated in humanitarian and other airlift missions. By the mid-1960s, it was augmenting Military Air Transport Service airlift operations on a regular basis.

=== Dispersed squadrons ===
Starting in late 1955, Continental Air Command (ConAC) began to disperse some of its reserve flying squadrons to separate bases in order to improve recruiting and avoid public objection to entire wings of aircraft being stationed near large population centers under what was called the Detached Squadron Concept. The wing's 337th Troop Carrier Squadron was activated at Bradley Field, Connecticut in July 1958 and its 336th Troop Carrier Squadron moved to Stewart Air Force Base, New York in April 1961 as part of this program.

In April 1959, the wing reorganized under the Dual Deputy system. Its 514th Troop Carrier Group was inactivated and the 335th, 336th and 337th Troop Carrier Squadrons were assigned directly to the wing.

=== Activation of groups under the wing ===
Although the dispersal of flying units was not a problem when the entire wing was called to active service, mobilizing a single flying squadron and elements to support it proved difficult. This weakness was demonstrated in the partial mobilization of reserve units during the Berlin Crisis of 1961 To resolve this, at the start of 1962, ConAC determined to reorganize its reserve wings by establishing groups with support elements for each of its troop carrier squadrons. This reorganization would facilitate mobilization of elements of wings in various combinations when needed. However, as this plan was entering its implementation phase, another partial mobilization occurred for the Cuban Missile Crisis. The formation of troop carrier groups was delayed until January for wings that had not been mobilized. The 903d Troop Carrier Group at McGuire, the 904th Troop Carrier Group at Stewart, and the 905th Troop Carrier Group at Bradley were all assigned to the wing on 17 January.

=== Vietnam War ===
The wing trained South Vietnamese aircrews and maintenance personnel and Greek maintenance personnel in C-119 aircraft, 10 August to 18 December 1967. In 1968, it ferried C-119s to South Vietnam. Also in 1968, two of the wing's groups began flying Lockheed C-141 Starlifters belonging to the 436th Military Airlift Wing at Dover Air Force Base, Delaware and the 438th Military Airlift Wing at McGuire Air Force Base, New Jersey. A third C-141 group joined the wing in September 1969, associated with the 437th Military Airlift Wing at Charleston Air Force Base, South Carolina. In 1969, the wing gained another group which flew the McDonnell Douglas C-9 Nightingales of the 375th Aeromedical Airlift Wing. A C-119 group remained with the wing until mid-1970.

=== Associate unit ===
By 1968 regular air force military airlift squadrons were operating the Lockheed C-141 Starlifter, while the reserves still flew the obsolete Douglas C-124 Globemaster II. As the Globemaster was retired, Air Force Reserve formed associate units. In this program reserve units flew and maintained aircraft owned by an associated regular unit. In September 1968, the wing gave up its own aircraft and became an associate of the 438th Military Airlift Wing at McGuire.

In Jul 1973, its groups at Dover and Charleston were replaced by new reserve wings, and the 514th Wing absorbed all of the squadrons of what had been its 903d Group at McGuire. Continuing to use C-141 aircraft of the active wing at McGuire Air Force Base (first the 438th and later the 305th Air Mobility Wing), the wing's crews augmented Military Airlift Command units for strategic airlift missions worldwide, including contingency and humanitarian operations and took part in strategic mobility exercises for training.

Operations in which crews participated were Urgent Fury to Grenada in 1983, Operation Just Cause to Panama in 1989, and Operation Restore Hope to Somalia in 1992. In 1993 the wing added aerial refueling to its airlift mission. Since then the wing has been a part of every major conflict including Operations Desert Storm/Shield, Operation Uphold Democracy, Southern Watch, Noble Eagle, Enduring Freedom, and Iraqi Freedom. Its members deployed in response to Hurricanes Katrina and Rita and the bombings of U.S. embassies in Kenya and Tanzania.

=== Current units ===
- 514th Operations Group

732d Airlift Squadron
514th Aeromedical Evacuation Squadron
514th Air Mobility Operations Squadron

- 514th Maintenance Group
- 514th Mission Support Group
- 514th Aeromedical Staging Squadron
- 514th Aerospace Medicine Squadron

== Lineage ==
- Established as the 514th Troop Carrier Wing, Medium on 10 May 1949

Activated in the reserve on 26 June 1949
Ordered to active service on 1 May 1951
Inactivated on 1 February 1953

- Activated in the reserve on 1 April 1953

Redesignated 514th Tactical Airlift Wing on 1 July 1967
Redesignated 514th Military Airlift Wing (Associate) on 25 September 1968
Redesignated 514th Airlift Wing (Associate) on 1 Feb 1992
Redesignated 514th Air Mobility Wing on 1 October 1994
Redesignated 514th Airlift Wing on 1 January 2026

=== Assignments ===
- Fourteenth Air Force, 26 June 1949
- First Air Force, 10 October 1949
- Tactical Air Command, 2 May 1951
- Eighteenth Air Force, 1 June 1951 – 1 February 1953
- First Air Force, 1 April 1953
- Fourteenth Air Force, 25 March 1958
- First Air Force Reserve Region, 15 August 1960
- Eastern Air Force Reserve Region, 31 December 1969
- Fourteenth Air Force, 8 October 1976
- Twenty-Second Air Force, 1 July 1993
- Fourth Air Force, 1 October 2011 – present

=== Components ===
Groups

- 98th Air Refueling Group: 1 October 1993 – 30 September 1994
- 514th Troop Carrier Group (later 514th Operations Group): 26 June 1949 – 1 February 1953; 1 April 1953 – 14 April 1959; 1 August 1992 – present
- 903d Troop Carrier Group (later 903d Tactical Airlift Group, 903d Military Airlift Group): 17 January 1963 – 1 July 1973
- 904th Troop Carrier Group: 17 January 1963 – 1 July 1966
- 905th Troop Carrier Group: 17 January 1963 – 1 July 1966
- 912th Troop Carrier Group (later 912th Tactical Airlift Group, 912th Military Airlift Group): 1 July 1966 – 1 July 1973
- 913th Troop Carrier Group (later 913th Tactical Airlift Group): 1 July 1966 – 17 September 1970 (detached after 1 July 1970)
- 932d Military Airlift Group, 1 April 1969 – 1 January 1972
- 943d Military Airlift Group: 25 September 1969 – 1 July 1973

Squadrons

- 335th Troop Carrier Squadron (later 335th Military Airlift Squadron): 14 April 1959 – 17 January 1963, 1 July 1973 – 1 August 1992
- 336th Troop Carrier Squadron: 14 April 1959 – 17 January 1963
- 337th Troop Carrier Squadron: 14 April 1959 – 17 January 1963
- 702d Military Airlift Squadron: 1 July 1973 – 1 August 1992
- 732d Military Airlift Squadron: 1 July 1973 – 1 August 1992

=== Stations ===
- Birmingham Municipal Airport, Alabama, 26 June 1949
- Mitchel Air Force Base, New York, 10 October 1949 – 1 February 1953
- Mitchel Air Force Base, New York, 1 April 1953
- McGuire Air Force Base, New Jersey, 15 March 1961 – present

=== Aircraft ===
- Fairchild C-119 Flying Boxcar (1952–1970)
- Beechcraft C-45 Expeditor (1953)
- Douglas C-124 Globemaster II (1966, 1969)
- Lockheed C-141 Starlifter (1968 – 200x)
- McDonnell Douglas C-9 Nightingale (1969–1971)
- Lockheed C-5 Galaxy (1973)
- McDonnell Douglas KC-10 Extender (1994–2022)
- McDonnell Douglas C-17 Globemaster III (2004–present)
- Boeing KC-46 Pegasus (2022-2023)
