= Columbia Army Air Base =

World War II US Army Air Forces base in South Carolina

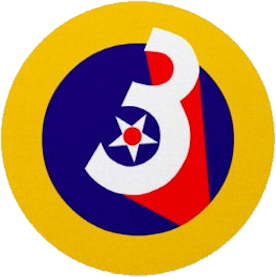
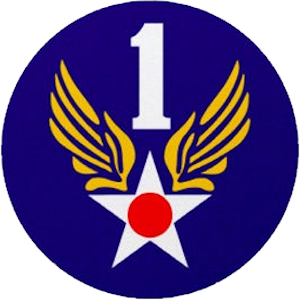
Columbia Army Air Base
- Part of Third Air Force; First Air Force
- Located near: Columbia, South Carolina
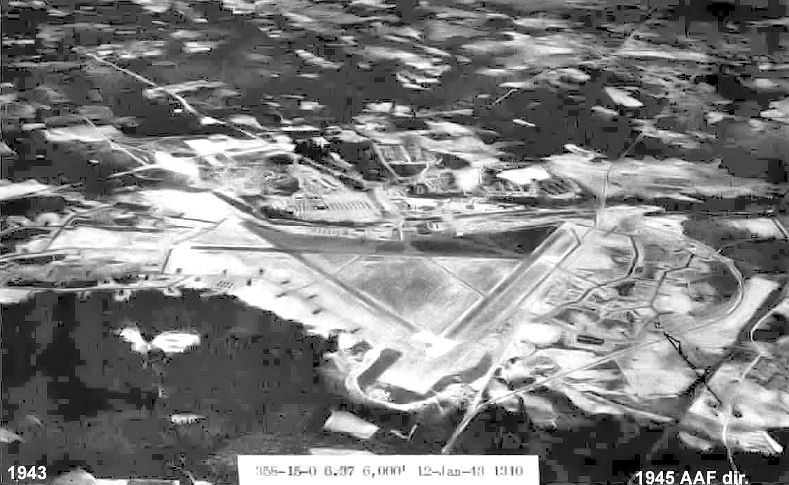
- 1943 photo of Columbia Army Air Base

Location
- Coordinates: 33°56′20″N 081°07′10″W

Site history
- Built: 1940
- In use: 1941-1945

Columbia Army Air Base was a World War II United States Army Air Forces base. It was primarily used for advanced combat training of B-25 Mitchell medium bomber units and replacement pilots.

It was used as a training base in early 1942 for Doolittle's Raiders. It was closed during the summer of 1945, and turned over for civil use as the Columbia Metropolitan Airport.

== History ==
=== Origins ===
In 1940 the United States Army Air Corps indicated a need for the Lexington County Airport as part of the buildup of its forces after World War II began in Europe. The earliest recorded Air Corps use of the airport was when the 105th Observation Squadron began flying Douglas O-38 and North American O-47 observation aircraft beginning on 24 September.

In 1941, the airport came under formal military control and an immediate construction program began to turn the civil airport into a military airfield. Construction involved runways and airplane hangars, with three concrete runways, several taxiways and a large parking apron and a control tower. Several large hangars were also constructed. Buildings were ultimately utilitarian and quickly assembled. Most base buildings, not meant for long-term use, were constructed of temporary or semi-permanent materials. Although some hangars had steel frames and the occasional brick or tile brick building could be seen, most support buildings sat on concrete foundations but were of frame construction clad in little more than plywood and tar paper.

While under construction, the 65th Observation Group used the unfinished facilities at the airfield between 1 September and 1 December 1941, flying a mixture O-47s, O-49 Vigilant and O-52 Owl light observation planes as part of the "Carolina Maneuvers" in the fall of 1941 performing reconnaissance and aerial photo duties.

=== World War II ===
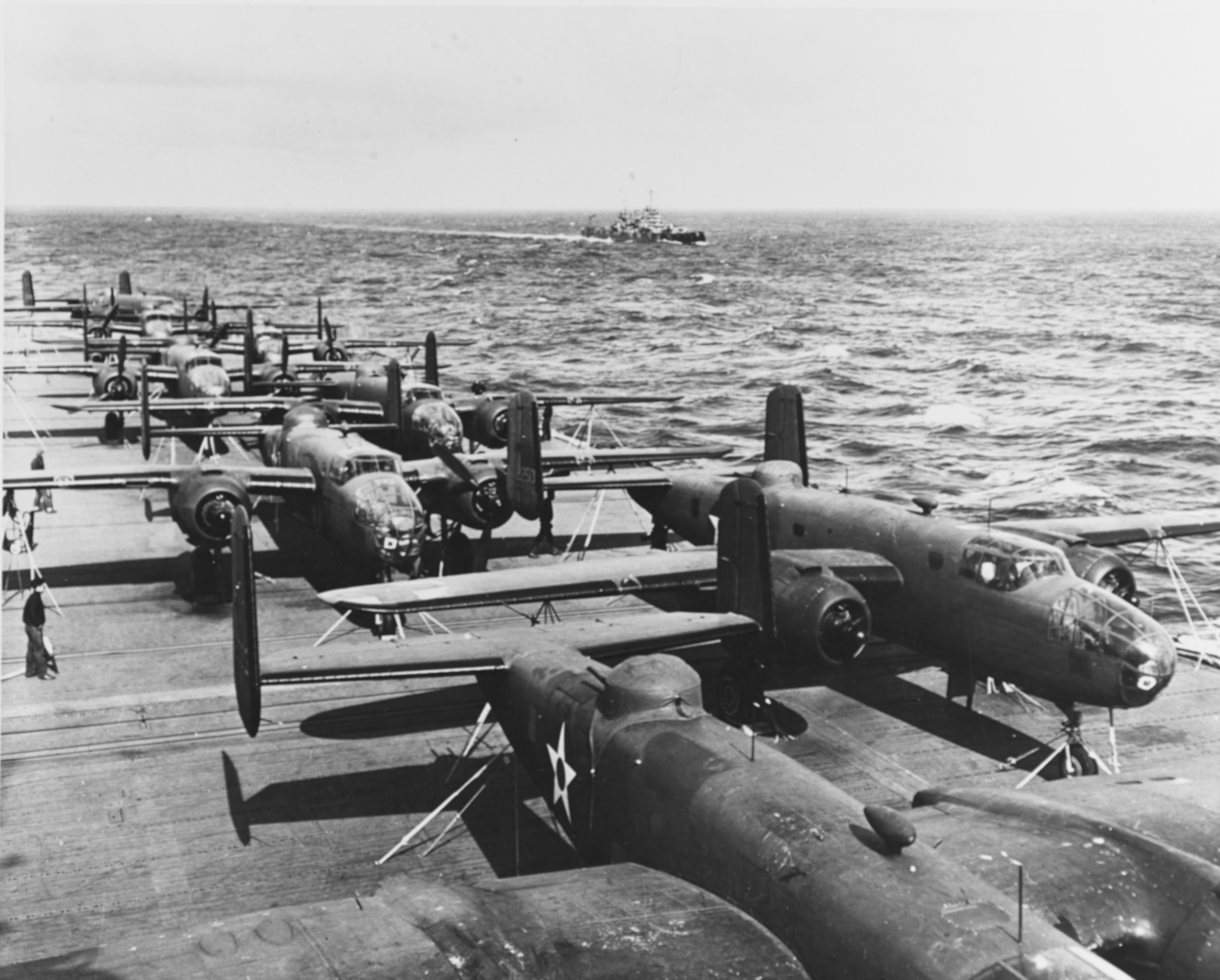
Doolittle Raid B-25Bs aboard USS Hornet

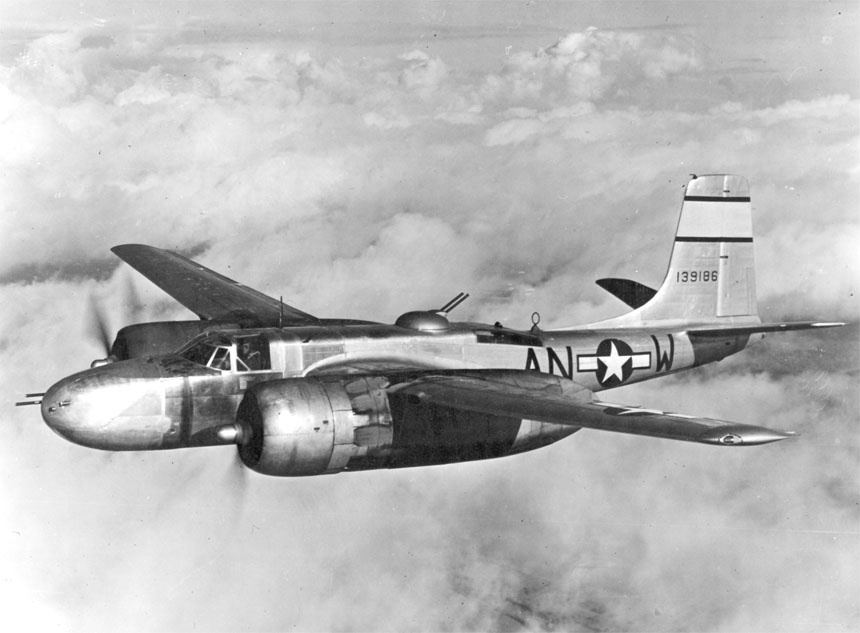
A-26B-15-DL (41-39186)

On 8 December 1941, the Columbia Army Airbase was activated with Lt. Colonel Dashe W. Reeves as commander. It was assigned to Third Air Force, III Air Support Command. The 121st Observation Squadron was moved to the new air base from nearby Owens Field, replacing the 105th OS which was sent to Langley Field, Virginia and the Marine Corps airfield at Cherry Point North Carolina to fly antisubmarine patrols. The 121st OS, which had also been flying observation flights as part of the "Carolina Maneuvers", began antisubmarine patrols over the Atlantic coast using O-47s and L-4 Grasshoppers.

The 96th Air Base Squadron was initially assigned as the base host unit for ground support squadrons, being replaced by the 19th Air Base Group in February 1942. The antisubmarine patrol mission was reassigned to Charleston AAF which was much better suited for it, as Charleston was located right on the Atlantic coast. Columbia Army Airfield's mission was changed become a training base for B-25 Mitchell medium bomber aircrews.

In addition to the main facility, Columbia AAB had jurisdiction over several satellite and auxiliary airfields in support of the bomber training mission:

- Barnwell Army Airfield, Barnwell, South Carolina
- Congaree Army Airfield, Eastover
- North Army Airfield, North, South Carolina
- Walterboro Army Airfield, Walterboro, South Carolina
- Johns Island Army Airfield, Johns Island, South Carolina

==== Doolitle Raiders ====
One of the earliest units to train at Columbia AAB was the 17th Bombardment Group, which arrived on 9 February 1942. The squadrons of the 17th Bomb group came to Columbia AAB from Pendleton Field, Oregon to fly antisubmarine patrols off the east coast of the United States. When the group arrived in Columbia its combat crews were offered the opportunity to volunteer for an "extremely hazardous" but unspecified mission which ultimately turned out to be the famous Doolittle Raid on Japan. On 17 February, 24 full combat crews from amongst the group were detached from Eighth Air Force and transferred to Eglin Field, Florida where they received intensive training for three weeks in simulated carrier deck takeoffs, low-level and night flying, low altitude bombing, and over water navigation. Contrary to popular belief, the volunteers who made up the crews of the Doolittle Raid did not train for the Raid itself at Columbia.

==== B-25 Combat Crew Training ====
The 21st Bombardment Group became the B-25 Operational training unit at Columbia on 21 April 1942, until the unit was reassigned organizationally to Key Field, Mississippi on 22 May. The 21st was replaced by the 309th Bombardment Group, which exchanged designations with the 21st, being reassigned from Key Field.

The 329th Bomb Group (and its successor designations) was the major operational training unit (OTU) at Columbia AAB during World War II, providing crew and replacement training in B-25s until 1 May 1944 when the 309th was re-designated as the 329th Bombardment Group. It was subsequently re-designated as the 329th Army Air Force Base Replacement Unit on 1 August 1944.

Known B-25 Groups that trained at Columbia AAB were:

- 310th Bombardment Group, 16 May-14 August 1942
- 321st Bombardment Group, 1 August–September 1942
- 340th Bombardment Group, 20 August-20 November 1942

Beginning in 1943, the 309th performed replacement training, rather than group training. On 1 October 1944, Columbia AAB was reassigned to III Bomber Command, and the training units were again re-designated as the Columbia Combat Crew Training Depot (Medium Bombardment). All sub-bases and satellite airfields were either reassigned or inactivated.

On 1 February 1945, Columbia was relieved from assignment to Third Air Force, and was transferred to First Air Force. The base unit was re-designated as the 129th Army Air Force Base Unit (Combat Crew Training Station) (Light), and the mission was changed from training B-25 crews to A-26 Invader Light bombardment crews.

The 319th Bombardment Group (light) arrived at Columbia on 28 February 1945 from Twelfth Air Force in Italy for conversion training from B-25s to A-26s. The group left for Okinawa on 27 April 1945.

Training at Columbia Army Air Base was phased down during the summer of 1945. Several units arrived at the base from overseas to inactivate during September and October. It was inactivated on 30 November and returned to civil authorities, which converted it back to an airport, however, the 350th Bombardment Squadron was assigned to Columbia Metropolitan Airport on 16 July 1947 as part of the Air Force Reserve, but it was never equipped or manned. It was inactivated on 27 June 1949

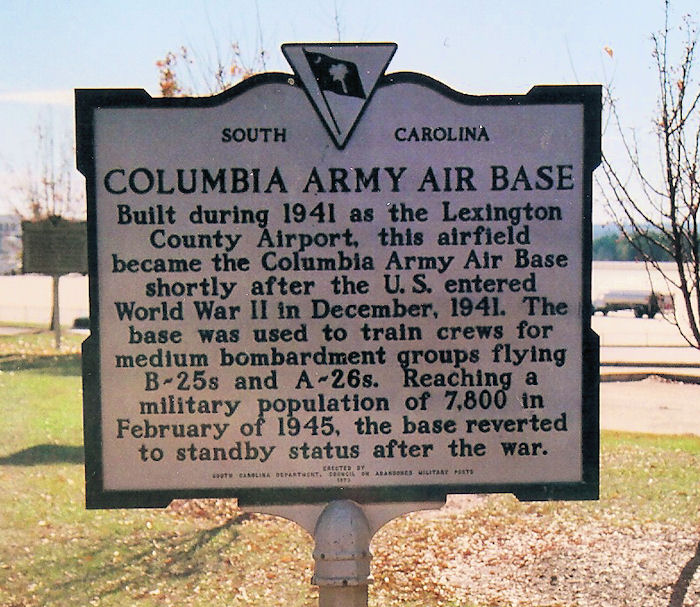
Columbia Army Air Base historical marker

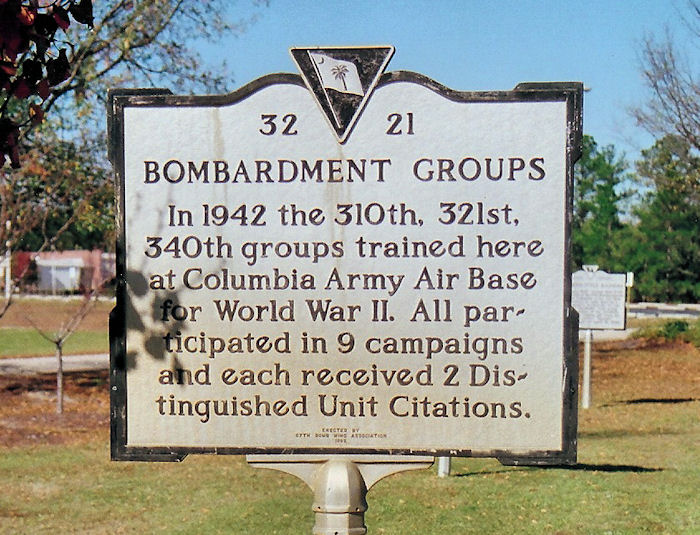
Bombardment Groups historical marker

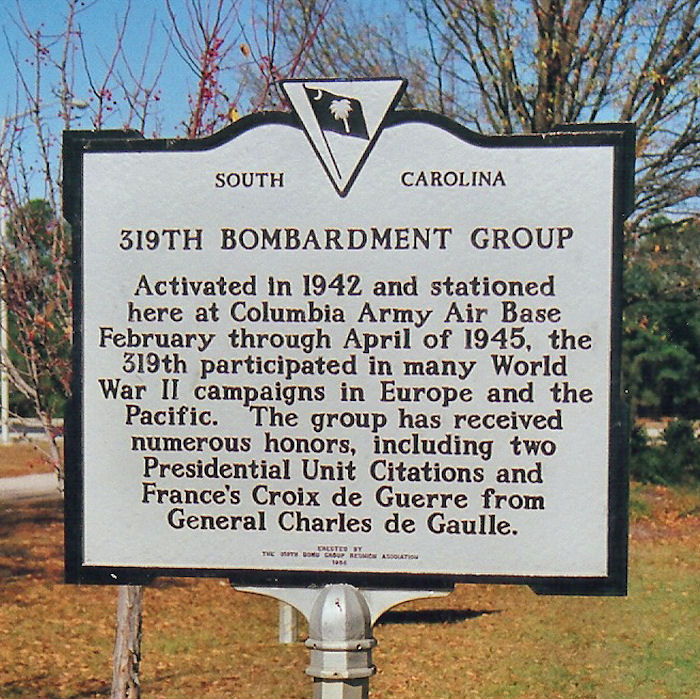
319th Bombardment Group historical marker

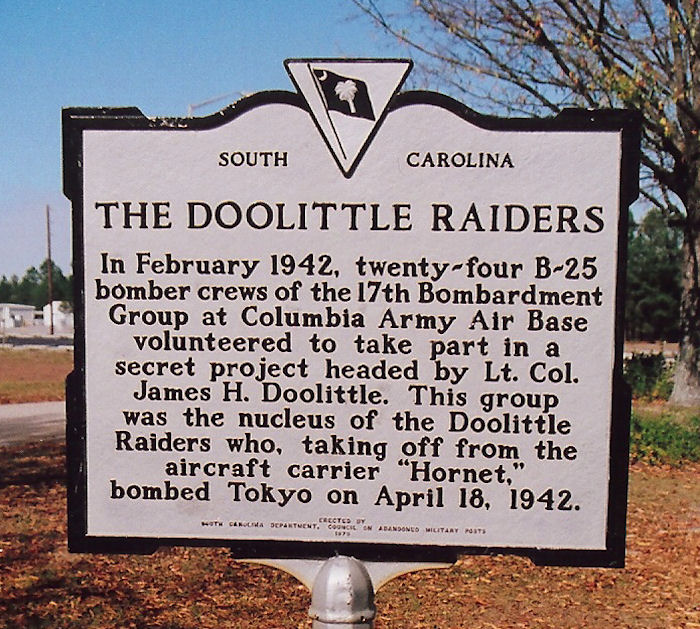
The Doolittle Raiders historical marker

== Lake Murray B-25 Bomber ==
On 19 September 2005, a North American B-25C Mitchell medium bomber (AAF Ser. No. 41-12634 (c/n 82-5269)) was recovered from Lake Murray, about fourteen miles northwest of Columbia Army Airfield. It crashed into Lake Murray on 4 April 1943 due to engine failure. All of its crewmen were able to abandon the plane and were picked up by local fishermen as the plane sank to the bottom in about 100 feet of water. The starboard engine was ripped off in the crash and landed elsewhere, but it was also recovered by divers in 2005.

During the war, Air Force records indicate that 23 B-25s crashed into the lake during training missions, many at night with very inexperienced crews. Many of the airmen in these bombers were killed in these training accidents.

The B-25 recovered from the lake was later shipped to the Southern Museum of Flight, Birmingham, Alabama to undergo preservation (not restoration). In December 2005 the front section went on display there.

== See also ==
- South Carolina World War II Army Airfields
