= South Carolina World War II Army Airfields =

South Carolina World War II Army Airfields
- Part of World War II

Site information
- Type: Army Airfields

Location
- Map Of Major South Carolina World War II Army Airfields Third Air Force AAF Training Command; AAF Contract Flying Schools; Multiple Commands

Site history
- Built: 1940-1944
- In use: 1940-present

During World War II, the United States Army Air Forces (USAAF) established numerous airfields in South Carolina for antisubmarine defense in the Gulf of Mexico and for training pilots and aircrews of USAAF fighters and bombers.

Most of these airfields were under the command of Third Air Force or the Army Air Forces Training Command (AAFTC). However the other USAAF support commands (Air Technical Service Command (ATSC) and Air Transport Command (ATC) maintained a large base in Charleston.

It is still possible to find remnants of these wartime airfields. Many were converted into municipal airports, some were returned to agriculture and several were retained as United States Air Force installations and were front-line bases during the Cold War. Hundreds of the temporary buildings that were used survive today, and are being used for other purposes.

== Major Airfields ==
=== Multiple Commands ===
- Charleston Army Airfield, 10.6 miles (17.1 km) northwest of Charleston

421st Base HQ and Air Base Squadron
Initially: Air Technical Service Command (29th Air Base Group, Distribution Point #2)
Also used by: Army Air Forces Antisubmarine Command (16th Antisubmarine Squadron)
Later: Transferred to: First Air Force (113th AAF Base Unit)
Later: Transferred to: Air Transport Command (593d AAF Base Unit)
Later: Charleston Air Force Base (1952-2010)
Now: Joint Base Charleston (2010-Present) (IATA: CHS, ICAO: KCHS, FAA LID: CHS)

=== Third Air Force ===
- Aiken Army Airfield, 6.5 miles (10.5 km) north-northeast of Aiken

Sub-base of: Morris Army Airfield, North Carolina
359th Army Air Force Base Unit
Later: Aiken Air Force Station (1955-1975)
Now: Aiken Municipal Airport (IATA: AIK, ICAO: KAIK, FAA LID: AIK)

- Columbia Army Air Base, 6.5 miles (10.5 km) southwest of Columbia

309th/329th Bombardment Group, 329th AAF Base Unit
Also used by: Army Air Forces Antisubmarine Command
Later: Transferred to First Air Force
129th Army Air Force Base Unit
Known sub-bases and auxiliaries

Barnwell Army Airfield
Johns Island Army Airfield
North Army Airfield
Walterboro Army Airfield

Now: Columbia Metropolitan Airport (IATA: CAE, ICAO: KCAE, FAA LID: CAE)

- Greenville Army Airbase, 6.6 miles (10.6 km) south of Greenville

Later: Transferred to First Air Force
Known sub-bases and auxiliaries

Coronaca Army Airfield
Anderson Auxiliary Field

Later: Donaldson Air Force Base (1947-1963)
Now: Donaldson Center Airport (IATA: GDC, ICAO: KGYH, FAA LID: GYH)

- Congaree Army Airfield, 14.5 miles (23.3 km) east-southeast of Columbia

Later: Transferred to: United States Marine Corps
Now: McEntire Joint National Guard Base (IATA: MMT, ICAO: KMMT, FAA LID: MMT)

- Florence Army Airfield, 2.3 miles (3.7 km) east-southeast of Florence

Later: Transferred to First Air Force
Known sub-bases and auxiliaries

Hartsville Army Airfield
Hartsville Auxiliary Field

Now: Florence Regional Airport (IATA: FLO, ICAO: KFLO, FAA LID: FLO) i

- Myrtle Beach General Bombing and Gunnery Range, 2.5 miles (4.0 km) west-southwest of Myrtle Beach

Later: Myrtle Beach Army Airfield
519th Army Air Force Base Unit
Later: Transferred to First Air Force
136th Army Air Force Base Unit
Known sub-bases and auxiliaries

Ocean Drive Flight Strip

Later: Myrtle Beach Air Force Base (1956-1993)
Now: Myrtle Beach International Airport (IATA: MYR, ICAO: KMYR, FAA LID: MYR)

=== AAF Training Command ===
Eastern Flight Training Center

- Shaw Army Airfield, 8.4 miles (13.5 km) west-northwest of Sumter

Army Air Force Flying School (Basic)
Known sub-bases and auxiliaries

Burt Gin Auxiliary Field
Rembert Auxiliary Field
Monaghan Auxiliary Field
Sumter Municipal Airport

Now: Shaw Air Force Base (IATA: SSC, ICAO: KSSC, FAA LID: SSC)

==== AAF Contract Flying Schools ====
- Greenville Municipal Airport, 2.5 miles (4.0 km) east of Greenville

Southern Airways Contract Glider Pilot Training School (1941-1943)
Later: Transferred to: Air Technical Service Command (1943-1945)
529th Army Air Force Base Unit
Joint Civil/USAAF Use
Now: Greenville Downtown Airport (IATA: GMU, ICAO: KGMU, FAA LID: GMU)

- Palmer Field, 2.8 miles (4.5 km) west of Bennettsville

Georgia Air Service, Inc & Southeastern Air Service, Inc.
Now: Marlboro County Jetport (IATA: BTN, ICAO: KBBP, FAA LID: BBP)

- Hawthorne School of Aeronautics, 5 miles (8.0 km) south of Orangeburg

Free French Air Force pilot training
58th Flying Training Detachment
Known sub-bases and auxiliaries

Jennings Auxiliary Field
Hagood Auxiliary Field
Kennedy Auxiliary Field

Now: Non-aviation use

- Woodward Field Airport, 3.5 miles (5.6 km) northeast of Camden

(IATA: CDN, ICAO: KCDN, FAA LID: CDN)
Southern Aviation School

== Minor Airfields ==
- Chinquapin Airport, 2.5 miles (4.0 km) west of Greenwood

Preflight cadet pilot screening
Now: Non-aviation use

- Columbia Municipal Airport, 3.1 miles (5.0 km) southeast of Columbia

Used for training of observation pilots (3d AF); supported Fort Jackson; US Navy use.
Now: Jim Hamilton – L.B. Owens Airport (IATA: CUB, ICAO: KCUB, FAA LID: CUB)

- Lane Intermediate Field (CAA Site #24), 48 miles (77 km) north of Charleston

Auxiliary fighter pilot training field
Abandoned 1983

- Manning Airfield, 1.7 miles (2.7 km) south of Allendale

Undetermined usage by AAF
Abandoned, undetermined history 33°01′13″N 081°16′58″W

- Roddey Airport, 1.9 miles (3.1 km) south-southwest of Rock Hill

Likely Emergency landing airfield
Abandoned approx 1965. 34°54′02″N 081°02′33″W

- Spartanburg Memorial Airport, 2.7 miles (4.3 km) south-southwest of Spartanburg

Joint Civil/USAAF airfield; supported Army Camp Croft Infantry Replacement Training Center
Transferred to: United States Navy 1943
(IATA: SPA, ICAO: KSPA, FAA LID: SPA)
