= 19th Weapons Squadron =

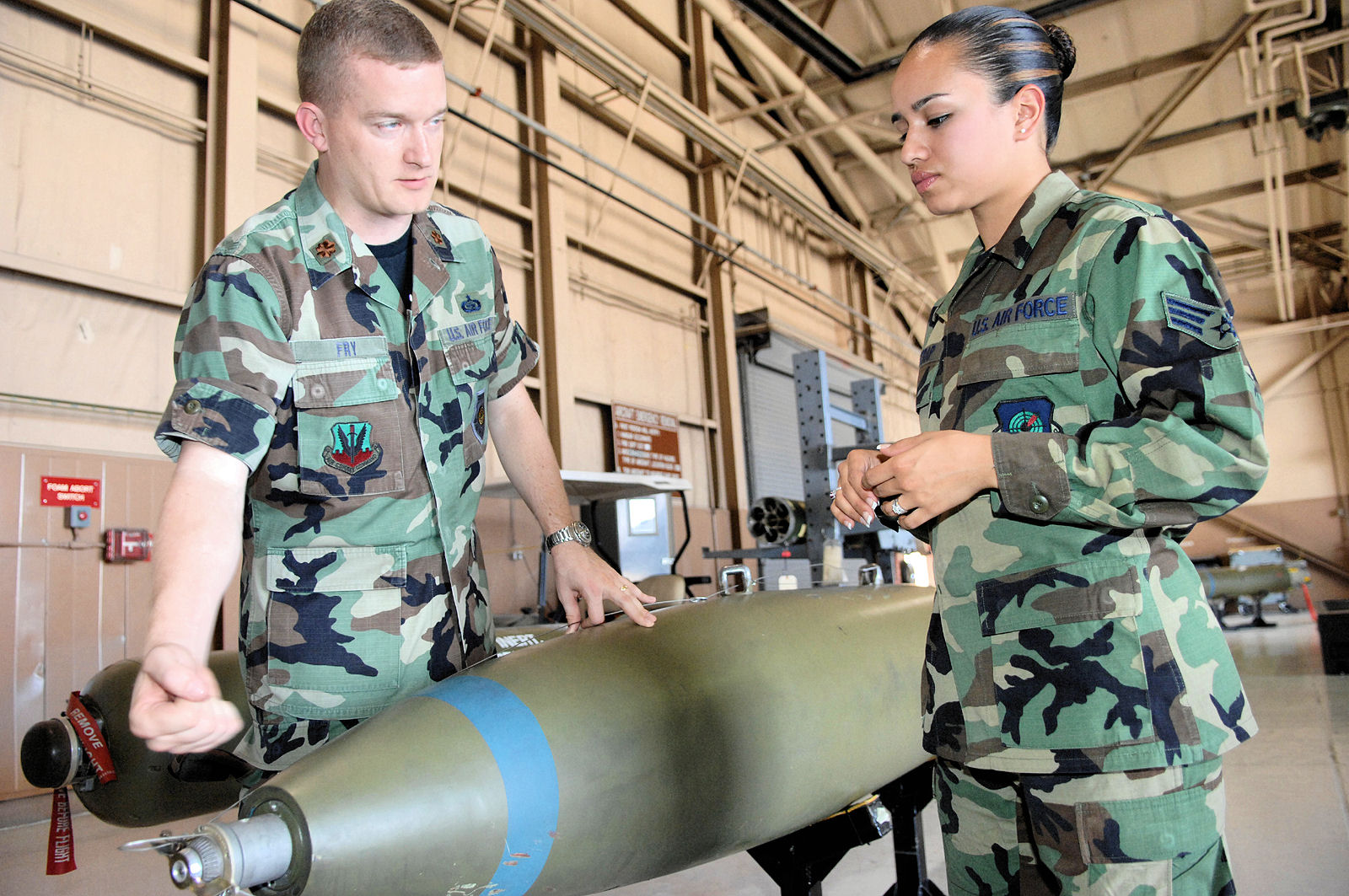
- Major William Fry, 19th Weapons School instructor and director of operations, explains to Senior Airman Brandi Gilstrap about the specs of an air-to-ground munition
- Active: 1942–1945; 1963–1964; 1964–1993; 2003–present
- Country: United States
- Branch: United States Air Force
- Type: Squadron
- Role: Advanced Intelligence, Surveillance, and Reconnaissance Training
- Part of: USAF Weapons School
- Garrison/HQ: Nellis Air Force Base, Nevada
- Motto: "Rustic" "To the Green Door..."
- Engagements: World War II: American Antisubmarine Theater; World War II (Asia-Pacific Theater); Vietnam War

- Decorations: Distinguished Unit Citation (3x) Air Force Outstanding Unit Award with Combat "V" Device (4x) Air Force Outstanding Unit Award (6x) Republic of Vietnam Gallantry Cross with Palm Republic of Korea Presidential Unit Citation

Insignia
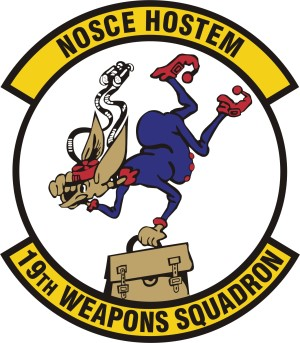
- 19th Weapons Squadron emblem

The 19th Weapons Squadron is a United States Air Force unit assigned to the USAF Weapons School at Nellis AFB, Nevada.

The squadron was first activated as the 19th Observation Squadron in March 1942. The 19th originally flew antisubmarine missions during World War II, then moved to China in 1944 to begin observation missions in support of Chinese ground forces. It later flew resupply missions to resistance forces operating behind enemy lines in French Indochina.

The squadron was redesignated the 19th Tactical Air Support Squadron, then organized in July 1963. From 1963 through 1968 the 19th Tactical Air Support Squadron flew forward air support and observation missions over Vietnam until its mission was transferred to Osan AB, South Korea in 1972, where it provided Eighth US Army and Republic of Korea ground forces with aerial reconnaissance and close air support.

== Overview ==
The squadron has three syllabi, the Advanced Intelligence Instructor Course, the Intelligence Weapons Instructor Course and the Intelligence Sensor Weapons Instructor Course, and a flight that supports mission planning for 17,000 sorties annually.

== History ==
=== World War II ===
Activated as the 19th Observation Squadron (Light) on 5 February 1942. The squadron activated on 2 March 1942 at Miami Municipal Airport as part of the Air Force Combat Command. Five days later, it moved to Jacksonville Municipal Airport, Florida. Two days after that, it became part of Army Air Forces. On the 29th, it became part of the 66th Observation Group.

It moved to Pope Army Airfield, North Carolina on 11 May 1942. While there, it was redesignated as the 19th Observation Squadron. On 19 October 1942, it moved to Morris Field, North Carolina. On 2 April 1943, it changed name once again, to 19th Liaison Squadron. The following day, it transferred bases to Camp Campbell, Kentucky. On 22 June 1943, it changed airfields once more, to Aiken Army Airfield, South Carolina. On 11 August 1943, it was assigned to I Air Support Command.

It flew anti-submarine missions using A-20 Havocs, B-25 Mitchells, and O-52 Owls, while undergoing observation training at these various bases in the southeastern states. They used L-1 Vigilants, L-2 Grasshoppers, Aeronca L-3s, L-4 Grasshoppers, L-5 Sentinels, L-6 Grasshoppers, and Douglas O-46s for observation sorties. P-39 Airacobras, P-43 Lancers, and P-51 Mustangs were also in the squadron aircraft inventory.

From Aiken, the squadron shipped cross-country to Camp Anza, California, arriving on 28 March 1944. This was a transit base for the squadron, as it shipped out to Bombay (now Mumbai), India. It arrived in India on 9 April, and was attached to U.S. Army Forces, China-India-Burma. It spent an itinerant few weeks further training in India, moving through Kanchrapara and Ondal, to land in Chabua on 17 May.

It then moved onward to Kunming, China arriving on 29 May 1944. They were attached to Y Force, to begin observation missions in support of Chinese Nationalist ground forces. They supported Y Force until 8 August. Their American parent unit would be variously Fourteenth Air Force and the 69th Composite Wing.

At various times, the 19th operated detachments from Kunming, Baoshan, Wenshan, Yunnanyi, Zhijiang, Guiyang, and Liuzhou. It moved bases to Chenggong on 28 March 1945. After March 1945, the squadron carried mail and passengers to American liaison personnel in South China, and the 19th flew re-supply missions to resistance forces operating behind enemy lines in French Indochina.

On 1 August, the 19th was placed under operational control of Tenth Air Force. Shortly after the Japanese surrendered, on 18 August 1945, the 19th moved to Nanning, China. From there it returned via Calcutta, India to the U.S., where it inactivated on 1 December 1945 at Fort Lewis, Washington.

=== Vietnam War ===
The 19th TASS was the first Forward Air Control squadron assigned to the Vietnam War. It was activated on 19 June 1963 at Bien Hoa Air Base, with the aim of training Republic of Vietnam Air Force (RVNAF) pilots and observers as forward air controllers. However, the squadron would not be fully operational until 15 September 1963. The new unit faced formidable shortages in equipment. The only suitable aircraft, the Cessna O-1 Bird Dog, was no longer being manufactured; the U.S. Army held the scanty inventory of existing O-1s. They had to be refitted before being turned over. Ground transportation was also at a premium. Jeeps were not only in short supply, but radio jeeps were driven the minimum possible for fear jarring would damage the radios. Minimal mechanical maintenance was available, and replacement parts were no longer made for the Bird Dog. Radio equipment in general was outdated and inadequate.

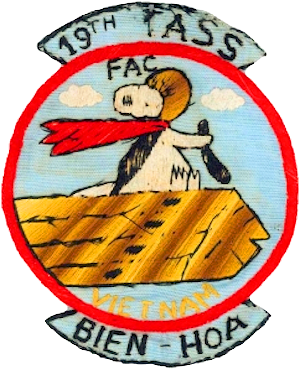
"Snoopy" Emblem, Bien Hoa AB

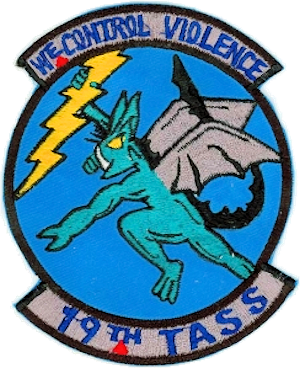
Dragon Emblem, Vietnam War

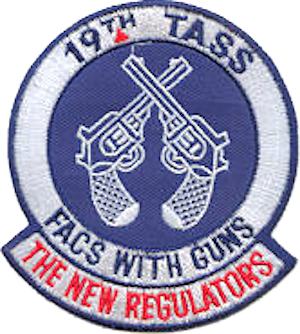
Vietnam War Emblem

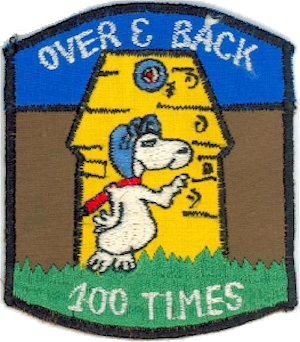
Vietnam War 100 Mission Emblem

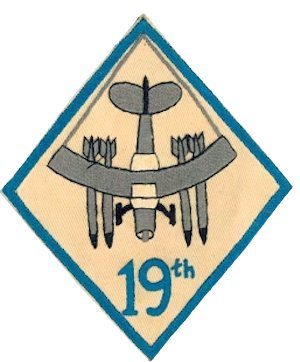
Vietnam War O-1 Bird Dog Emblem

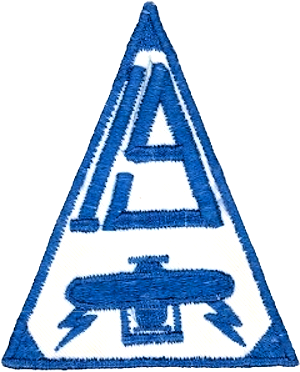
Vietnam War O-2 Skymaster Emblem

One of the squadron's added missions was flying support and forward air control for Project DELTA in their covert insertions into Laos. They began this secretive mission in July 1963, and carried it out until the 21st Tactical Air Support Squadron later took over the role. 19th TASS was also tasked with visual reconnaissance missions, psychological warfare, and logistics escort duties. While the 19th TASS's pilots could fly forward air control missions, a Vietnamese national had to approve any air strikes. With 44 pilots and 22 O-1s, the TASS never had more than 11 Vietnamese observers posted to it.

On 2 January 1964, 19th TASS began actual training of RVNAF pilots and observers. Observer training was lengthened from 14 hours to 17 weeks of instruction. By 30 June 91 Vietnamese FACs were available. On 1 July, the RVNAF was supposed to assume the FAC training duty. However, U.S. Secretary of Defense Robert McNamara noted that the RVNAF seemed to have made no improvement within the past year. He emphasized that the Americans should be training the Vietnamese so the latter could fight. However, the squadron's stand-down was postponed because of Vietnamese unreadiness. The Vietnamese were often overwhelmed by American technology. They slacked off, and allowed the Americans to fly the close air support missions instead. RVNAF policies did not help the situation, as trained RVNAF FAC pilots were returned to flying liaison sorties instead of FAC missions.

The squadron was inactivated on 8 August 1964, with its assets turned over to the Vietnamese. When the RVNAF proved unequal to taking over the disbanded squadron's responsibilities, the 19th TASS was reactivated on 21 October 1964. Not until January 1965 did six U.S. fighter pilot FACs return to resume the training. In this incarnation, the squadron's principal mission was visual reconnaissance and forward air control of fighter-bombers, although it continued to train Vietnamese pilots and observers. It was shifted to the 6251st Tactical Fighter Wing on 8 July 1965. Shortly thereafter, on 8 November 1965, it was transferred to the 505th Tactical Air Support Group. The 19th TASS began flying actual forward air control sorties out of Bien Hoa on 11 November 1965, using the call sign "Sidewinder". By July 1966, the 19th was parceled out among numerous forward operating locations in III Corps and II Corps. While serving as FACs and/or Air Liaison Officers, they used the radio net under various call signs, most of which were names of serpents.

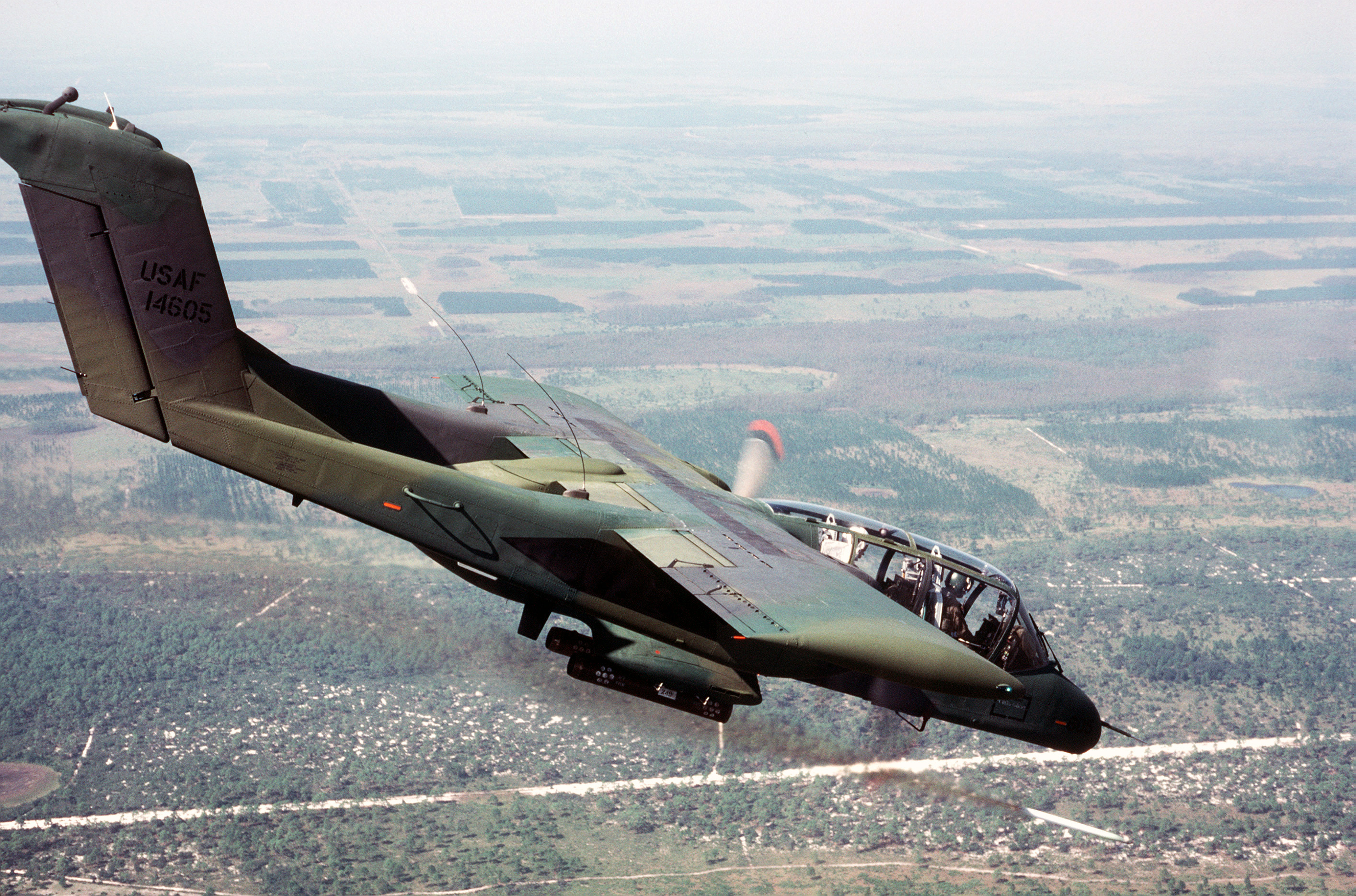
A USAF OV-10A firing a white phosphorus smoke rocket to mark a ground target

Beginning in 1968, the 19th TASS extended its squadron inventory to include O-2 Skymasters and OV-10 Broncos. On 15 January 1971, 19th TASS absorbed the 22nd Tactical Air Support Squadron, leaving the 22nd an unmanned unequipped paper unit. Representative of this change, the FACs supporting the 199th Light Infantry Brigade upgraded from O-1s to OV-10s at this time.

The unit transferred to Phan Rang Air Base, Vietnam on 1 August 1971. On 30 September 1971, another unit acquired the 19th's inventory. The 19th then remained a paper squadron until 15 January 1972, when it transferred to Osan AB, South Korea.

By the time the 19th TASS left Vietnam, it had earned three Presidential Unit Citations, four Air Force Outstanding Unit Awards with Combat V, the Republic of Vietnam Gallantry Cross with Palm, and numerous campaign honors for its Vietnam wartime service.

During its Vietnam service, the squadron had suffered 37 killed in action, with another two killed in a flying accident. There were also a number of casualties among non-USAF aerial observers. Its aircraft losses over the course of the war amounted to 53 O-1 Bird Dogs, 12 O-2 Skymasters and 16 OV-10 Broncos.

=== Korean Service ===
Transferred to Osan AB, South Korea, on 15 January 1972. It became part of the 314th Air Division; Colonel William Peters was placed in command. It was then reconstituted and took over the O-2 aircraft of another squadron. Its new role was support of the Eighth U.S. Army and Republic of Korea ground forces, providing close air and aerial reconnaissance support. In 1973, the 19th trained the Republic of Korea Air Force to operate a Direct Air Support Center.

On 30 September 1974, the Squadron was transferred to the 51st Composite Wing (Tactical). In 1975, the squadron converted to the OV-10A Bronco. From 1975 until 1980, 19th TASS operated the forward air control mission within the Korean tactical air control system. On 15 April 1976, Detachment 1 of the 19th was assigned to Camp Casey, South Korea, remaining there until 8 January 1980.

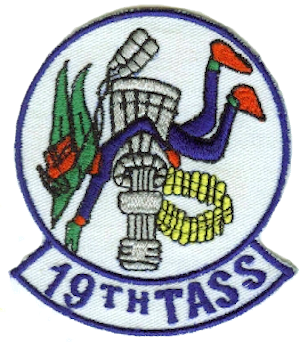
19th TASS Unit Emblem

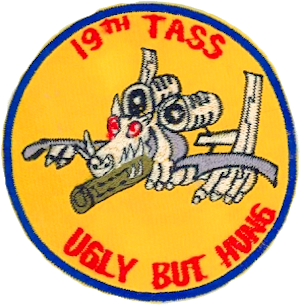
South Korea 1980s OA-10 Emblem

On 8 January 1980, the 19th TASS was forwarded to the 5th Tactical Air Control Group. In 1983, the squadron converted to the OA-37B Dragonfly twin-jet aircraft. In 1985, the 19th switched back to the OV-10. On 1 August 1989, the 19 TASS transferred to Suwon Air Base, South Korea and converted to the OA-10A aircraft. The OV-10s were either retired or transferred to the USMC.

During its time in the Republic of Korea, the 19 TASS used the call sign 'Bronco' while flying the OV-10, and 'Misty' after changing to the OA-37 and OA-10. The 19th TASS remained an active combat-ready unit flying the OA-10A aircraft until the Persian Gulf War in 1991.

The squadron was inactivated on 1 October 1993, without seeing further combat action.

=== Modern era ===
USAF Weapons School Intelligence Division was activated in 1989. Its personnel and equipment were the en cadre for the formation of the 19th Weapons Squadron on 3 February 2003.

In 2019, the 19th added two Weapons Instructor Courses for U-2 and RQ-4 pilots. As well as an Advanced Instructor Course (AIC) for enlisted intelligence analysts.

In 2025, the 19th's Intelligence AIC was formally merged with the Intelligence WIC course, codifying the expected parity in level of performance between enlisted and officer Intelligence Weapons Officers.

== Lineage ==
- Constituted as the 19th Observation Squadron (Light) on 5 February 1942

Activated on 2 March 1942
Redesignated: 19th Observation Squadron on 4 July 1942
Redesignated: 19th Liaison Squadron on 2 April 1943
Inactivated on 1 December 1945

- Redesignated 19th Tactical Air Support Squadron (Light), and activated, on 17 June 1963 (not organized)

Organized on 8 July 1963
Discontinued and inactivated on 8 August 1964

- Activated on 16 October 1964 (not organized)

Organized on 21 October 1964
Inactivated on 1 October 1993

- Redesignated 19th Weapons Squadron on 24 January 2003

Activated on 3 February 2003

=== Assignments ===
- Air Force Combat Command, 2 March 1942
- Army Air Forces, 9 March 1942
- 66th Observation Group(later 66th Reconnaissance Group), 29 March 1942
- I Air Support Command (later I Tactical Air Division), 11 August 1943
- U.S. Army Forces, China-Burma-India, April 1944
- Fourteenth Air Force. 29 May 1944 (attached to Y Force)
- 69th Composite Wing, 10 June 1944 (remained attached to Y Force until 8 August 1944)
- Tenth Air Force, 1 August 1945 – 1 December 1945
- 34th Tactical Group, 8 July 1963 – 8 August 1964
- 34th Tactical Group, 21 October 1964
- 6251st Tactical Fighter Wing, 8 July 1965 (attached to 6250th Tactical Air Support Group, Provisional, 1 August-8 November 1965)
- 505th Tactical Control Group, 8 November 1965 (attached to 6253d Tactical Air Support Group, Provisional, 9 September – 8 December 1966)
- 504th Tactical Air Support Group, 8 December 1966
- 314th Air Division, 15 January 1972
- 51st Composite Wing, 30 September 1974
- 5th Tactical Air Control Group, 8 January 1980
- 51st Operations Group, 1 October 1990 – 1 October 1993
- USAF Weapons School, 3 February 2003 – present

=== Components ===
- Detachment: 1 (Camp Casey, South Korea): 15 April 1976 – 8 January 1980.

=== Stations ===
- Miami Army Air Field, Florida, 2 March 1942
- Jacksonville Army Air Field, Florida, 7 March 1942
- Pope Field, North Carolina, 11 May 1942
- Morris Field, North Carolina, 19 October 1942
- Camp Campbell Army Air Field, Kentucky, 3 April 1943
- Aiken Army Air Field, South Carolina, 22 June 1943 – 26 February 1944
- Juhu Aerodrome, Bombay, India, 9 April 1944
- Kanchrapara Airfield, India, c. 15 April 1944
- Ondal Airfield, India, 29 April 1944
- Chabua Airfield, India, 17 May 1944
- Kunming Airport, China, 29 May 1944
- Chengkung Airfield, China, 28 March 1945
- Nanning Airport, China, 18 August 1945
- Calcutta Airport, India, c. October 1945 – 7 November 1945
- Fort Lewis, Wachington, 30 November 1945 – 1 December 1945
- Bien Hoa Air Base, South Vietnam, 8 July 1963 – 8 August 1964; 21 October 1964
- Bien Hoa Air Base, South Vietnam, 21 October 1964
- Phan Rang Air Base, South Vietnam, 1 August 1971
- Osan Air Base, South Korea, 15 January 1972
- Suwon Air Base, South Korea, 1 August 1989
- Osan Air Base, South Korea, 1 October 1990 – 1 October 1993
- Nellis Air Force Base, Nevada, 3 February 2003 – present

=== Aircraft ===
- A-20 Havoc, 1942–1943
- B-25 Mitchell, 1942–1943
- DB-7 Boston, 1942–1943
- L-1 Vigilant, 1942–1943, 1944–1945
- L-4 Grasshopper, 1942–1943, 1943–1944
- Douglas O-46, 1942–1943
- O-52 Owl, 1942
- P-39 Airacobra, 1942–1943
- P-43 Lancer, 1942–1943
- L-2 Grasshopper, 1943, 1943–1944
- L-3 Grasshopper, 1943
- L-5 Sentinel, 1943, 1943–1945
- L-6 Grasshopper, 1943; 1943–1944
- P-51 Mustang, 1943
- O-1 Bird Dog, 1963–1964, 1964–1970, 1971
- O-2 Skymaster, 1968–1971, 1972–1975
- OV-10 Bronco, 1968–1971, 1975–1983, 1985-c. 1989
- OA-37 Dragonfly, 1983–1985
- A(later OA)-10 Thunderbolt II, 1989–1993

== See also ==
- 20th Attack Squadron
- 22nd Attack Squadron
- 23rd Flying Training Squadron
- 25th Air Support Operations Squadron
- 137th Airlift Squadron
- Air Education and Training Command Studies and Analysis Squadron
- Raven Forward Air Controllers
- 54 Squadron ISR Warfare School UK Royal Air Force equivalent, delivering the QWI ISR course.
