= Aiken Air Force Station =

Closed United States Air Force General Surveillance Radar station

Aiken Air Force Station
- Aiken Army Air Field
- Part of Air Defense Command (ADC)
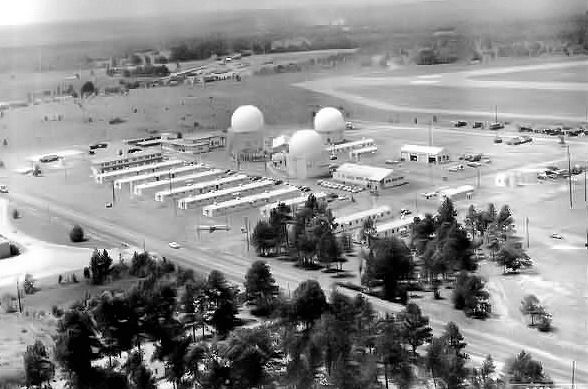
- 1964 USAF Photo

Site information
- Type: Air Force Station
- Code: ADC ID: SM-159, NORAD ID: Z-159
- Controlled by: United States Air Force

Location
- Location within South Carolina
- Coordinates: 33°38′46″N 081°40′36″W

Site history
- Built: 1955
- In use: 1955-1975

Garrison information
- Garrison: 861st Aircraft Control and Warning Squadron

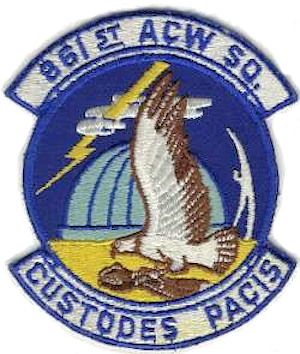
Emblem of the 861st Radar Squadron

Aiken Air Force Station is a closed United States Air Force General Surveillance Radar station. It is located 6.4 miles (10.3 km) north-northeast of Aiken, South Carolina. It was closed in 1975.

During World War II, the site was originally constructed by the United States Army Air Forces as Aiken Army Air Field.

== History ==
=== Aiken Army Air Field ===
The facility was originally constructed during World War II by the United States Army Air Forces and named Aiken Army Air Field. The airfield was constructed with three 5'000 foot bituminous runways in an "A" pattern. No known auxiliary airfields were constructed. The airfield and station opened on 24 December 1942 as a satellite airfield of Morris Army Airfield, North Carolina.

On 23 June 1943 the airfield was formally activated and the 66th Tactical Reconnaissance Group arrived. Two subordinate units, the 97th Tactical Reconnaissance Squadron and 19th Liaison Squadron arrived the previous day. The 118th Tactical Reconnaissance Squadron replaced the 97th on 29 August 1943. The Warner Robins Air Service Command (WRASC) established a service group training center at the field in the fall of 1943. The training was conducted under the auspices of the 387th Air Service Group, Daniel Field, Georgia.

In May 1944 the 359th Army Air Force Base Unit was assigned host unit. It was assigned to Third Air Force, III Tactical Air Command 13 September 1944 as a group training airfield for reconnaissance units. The airfield became a replacement training airfield for single-engine fighter pilots, training on P-40 Warhawk and P-51 Mustang aircraft, beginning on 19 October 1944. Active flying at the airfield ended on 28 February 1945, and jurisdiction of the base was transferred from Third Air Force to Air Technical Service Command for disposition on 31 March 1945.

It is also known that Aiken AAF held a branch prisoner of war camp holding about 300 POWs who worked in the local forests. The dates of the POW camp are uncertain. The airfield was turned over to local government authorities afterward and was converted into Aiken Municipal Airport.

=== Aiken Air Force Station ===
In 1955 the United States Air Force exercised a return right to Aiken Municipal Airport and established Aiken Air Force Station as an Air Defense Command (ADC) general surveillance radar station. This site was initially part of Phase II of the Mobile Radar program. Radars in this network were designated "SM."

Designated as SM-159 Aiken AFS was the first Phase II Mobile Radar system to achieve operational status. During December 1955 the 861st Aircraft Control and Warning Squadron began activating AN/FPS-3, AN/MPS-14, and AN/TPS-10D radars. Initially the station functioned as a Ground-Control Intercept (GCI) and warning station. As a GCI station, the squadron's role was to guide interceptor aircraft toward unidentified intruders picked up on the unit's radar scopes.

In 1958 an AN/FPS-20 and an AN/MPS-14 were operational. The site subsequently received an AN/FPS-7C search radar and an AN/FPS-26 heightfinder radar. During 1961 Aiken AFS joined the Semi Automatic Ground Environment (SAGE) system, initially feeding data to DC-09 at Gunter AFB, Alabama. After joining, the squadron was redesignated as the 861st Radar Squadron (SAGE) on 1 November 1961. The radar squadron provided information 24/7 the SAGE Direction Center where it was analyzed to determine range, direction altitude speed and whether or not aircraft were friendly or hostile.

On 31 July 1963, the site was redesignated as NORAD ID Z-159. In addition, Aiken AFS was incorporated into BUIC I, a manual back-up interceptor control system. BUIC I provided limited command and control capability in the event the SAGE system was disabled. Over the years, the equipment at the station was upgraded or modified to improve the efficiency and accuracy of the information gathered by the radars. The 861st was inactivated in June 1975.

The FAA continued to operate the AN/FPS-7C search radar for a few years, while the cantonment area was converted into a minimum-security prison. Dissatisfied with the prison setting, the FAA relocated to Lincolnton, Georgia, where today they continue to operate an ARSR-3 search radar. The prison was shut down in the mid / late 1990s, and the entire site has since been dismantled.

=== Units ===
Aiken Army Air Field

- 66th Tactical Reconnaissance Group

Moved from Camp Campbell, Ky on 22 June 1943 departed for Lebanon, TN ca. 25 October 1943

19th Liaison Squadron
Moved from Camp Campbell, KY on 23 June 1943, departed for India on 26 February 1944
97th Tactical Reconnaissance Squadron
Moved from Camp Campbell, KY on 23 Jun 1943, departed for Morris Field, NC on 29 August 1943
118th Tactical Reconnaissance Squadron
Moved from Statesboro Army Air Field, GA on 29 August 1943, departed for Key Field, MS on 25 October 1943

- 25th Service Group

Moved from Greenville AAB, SC in September 1943, departed for India on 13 January 1944

35th Service Squadron
Moved from Greenville AAB, SC in September 1943, departed for India on 13 January 1944
349th Service Squadron
Moved from Greenville AAB, SC in September 1943, departed for India on 13 January 1944

- 1332d Guard Squadron

Activated on 25 June 1943, disbanded ca. 1 April 1944

- 127th Liaison Squadron (Commando)/2d Air Commando Group

Moved from Statesboro Army Air Field, GA on 18 May 1944, moved to Dunnellon Army Air Field, FL on 10 June 1944

- 155th Liaison Squadron (Commando)/2d Air Commando Group

Activated on 10 June 1944, moved to Dunnellon Army Air Field, FL on 12 June 1944

- 156th Liaison Squadron (Commando)/2d Air Commando Group

Moved from Statesboro Army Air Field, GA on 18 May 1944, moved to Dunnellon Army Air Field, FL on 12 June 1944

- 162d Liaison Squadron/III Tactical Air Division

Activated on 15 May 1944, moved to Lafayette Airport, LA on 13 July 1944

- 349th Army Air Forces Base Unit

Organized ca. 1 April 1944, discontinued ca. 28 February 1945

- 4184th Army Air Forces Base Unit

Organized ca. 28 February 1945, discontinued ca. 31 March 1945

Aiken Air Force Station

- Constituted as the 861st Aircraft Warning and Control Squadron

Activated at Dobbins AFB (M-87), GA on 8 April 1955 (not manned or equipped)
Assigned to Aiken Air Force Station, SC, 1 December 1955
Redesignated as 861st Radar Squadron (SAGE) on 1 November 1961
Inactivated on 30 June 1975

=== Assignments ===
- Third Air Force, 24 December 1942
- First Air Force, 1 May 1944
- Air Technical Service Command, 28 February 1945 – 31 March 1945
- 35th Air Division, 1 December 1955
- 32d Air Division, 15 November 1958
- Montgomery Air Defense Sector, 1 July 1961
- 32d Air Division, 1 April 1966
- 33d Air Division, 14 November 1969
- 20th Air Division, 19 November 1959 – 30 June 1975

== See also ==
- South Carolina World War II Army Airfields
- List of USAF Aerospace Defense Command General Surveillance Radar Stations
