= KAIK =

KAIK may refer to:

- KAIK (FM), a radio station (88.5 FM) licensed to Rockaway Beach, Oregon, United States
- KLON, a radio station (90.3 FM) licensed to serve Tillamook, Oregon, which held the call sign KAIK from 2003 to 2019
- Aiken Municipal Airport (ICAO code KAIK)
