= UDG =

UDG may refer to:

== Universities ==
- University of Girona (UdG; Catalan: Universitat de Girona), in Girona, Spain
- University of Granma (UdG; Spanish: Universidad de Granma), in Bayamo, Cuba
- University of Guadalajara (UdeG; Spanish: Universidad de Guadalajara), in Jalisco, Mexico
- University of Donja Gorica (UDG), in Podgorica, Montenegro

== Science ==
- Uracil-DNA glycosylase (UDG), an enzyme
- Ultra diffuse galaxy (UDG), an extremely low luminosity galaxy

== Other uses ==
- UDG Healthcare, an Irish healthcare support company
- Muduga language, ISO 639-3 language code udg
- Udege language
- Darlington County Airport, South Carolina, US, FAA airport code UDG
- UTMC Development Group, a transport standards organisations in UK
- Urban Design Group, an American architectural design company
- Danganronpa Another Episode: Ultra Despair Girls, a 2014 video game
- User-defined graphic (in early computer character sets)

== See also ==
- UG (disambiguation)
- Goris Airport, ICAO airport code UDGS, an airport in Armenia
