= 97th Intelligence Squadron =

Nebraska-based unit studying and devising communication securities

97th Intelligence Squadron

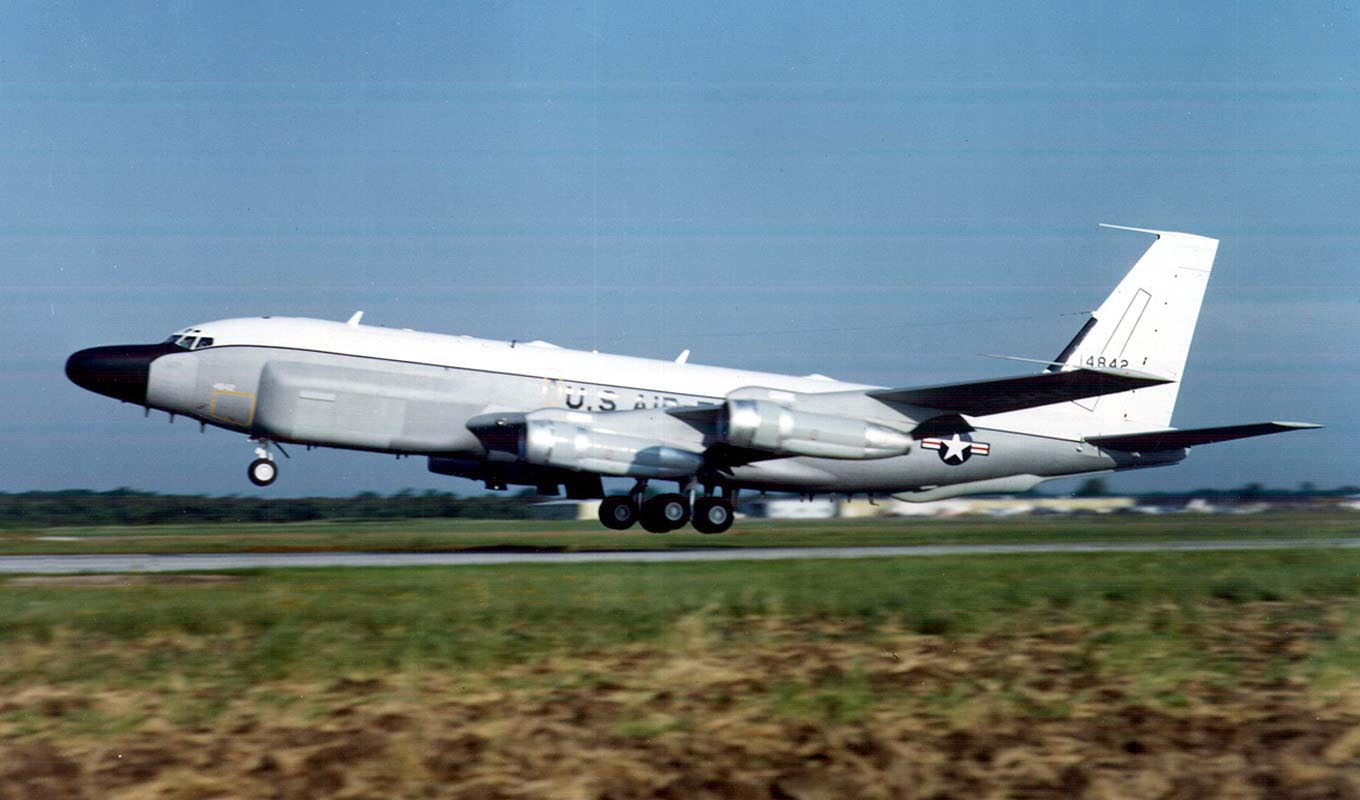
- Boeing RC-135V Rivet Joint
- Active: 1917–1919; 1935–1944; 1979–present
- Country: United States
- Branch: United States Air Force
- Role: Intelligence Collection
- Part of: Air Combat Command
- Garrison/HQ: Offutt Air Force Base, Nebraska
- Motto(s): We Can Handle It
- Engagements: Antisubmarine Campaign
- Decorations: Air Force Meritorious Unit Award; Air Force Outstanding Unit Award

Insignia
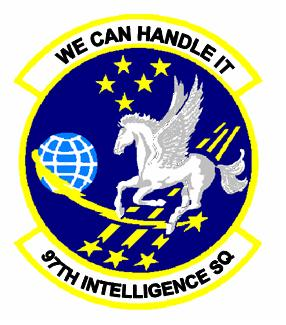
- 97th Intelligence Squadron emblem (approved 3 August 1982)

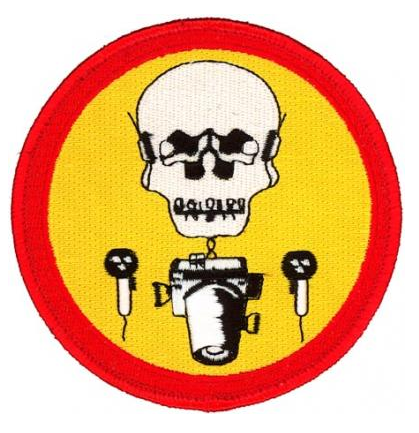
- 97th Tactical Reconnaissance Squadron emblem (approved 19 October 1936)

The United States Air Force's 97th Intelligence Squadron is an intelligence unit located at Offutt Air Force Base, Nebraska.

The squadron was first organized at Kelly Field, Texas in the summer of 1917 as the 97th Aero Squadron. It maintained and repaired aircraft in France until the end of World War I, when it returned to the United States and was demobilized.

The 97th Observation Squadron was activated at Mitchel Field, New York in 1935. The following year it was consolidated with the World War I squadron. After the Japanese attack on Pearl Harbor, the squadron engaged in antisubmarine patrols in the Atlantic. In 1942 it began to train aircrews and participate in military exercises with Army ground forces. The squadron was disbanded in 1944 in a major reorganization of the Army Air Forces.

The 6949th Electronic Security Squadron was organized at Offutt Air Force Base, Nebraska in 1979. In 1993 it was consolidated with the 97th Tactical Reconnaissance Squadron as the 97th Intelligence Squadron. For most of its existence the unit has provided on board intelligence specialists for reconnaissance units at Offutt.

== Mission ==
The 97th Intelligence Squadron is the largest support squadron in Air Combat Command. The squadron "provides communications, and command, control and communications countermeasures support to United States and allied forces. The unit conducts defensive studies of U.S. communications while developing and applying techniques and materials designed to ensure communications are secure and protected from hostile countermeasures. The 97th advises commanders concerning procedures and techniques that could be used to counter enemy command and control communications, and performs direction finding and range estimations in support of search and rescue operations."

== History ==
=== World War I ===
The squadron was first organized at Kelly Field, Texas in the summer of 1917 as the 97th Aero Squadron. After little more than a month of training, the squadron moved to the concentration center at Garden City, New York for shipment to France. The squadron arrived in November and maintained and repaired aircraft until the end of World War I in 1918. The squadron returned to the United States in early 1919 and was demobilized a few days later.

=== Interwar years ===
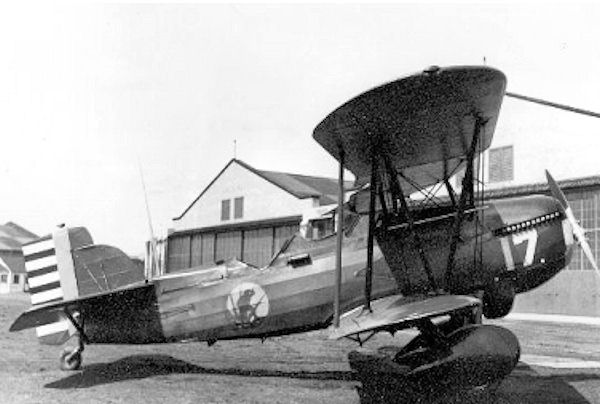
Curtiss O-39 Falcon

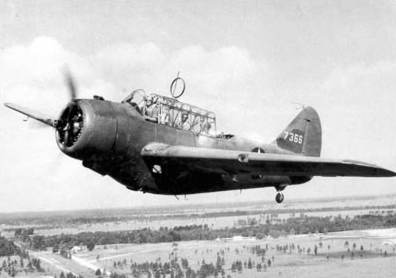
North American O-47A

The second incarnation of the unit began in 1935, when the Air Corps activated the 97th Observation Squadron at Mitchell Field, New York. The squadron was equipped with Curtiss Falcon airplanes, but flew a variety of other two seat Curtiss and Douglas biplane observation planes. Little more than a year later, the new squadron was consolidated with the World War I unit. The unit was assigned directly to Second Corps Area, although mobilization plans called for it to be combined with National Guard and Organized Reserve squadrons in an Observation Group in the event of war.

The squadron began to fly more modern metal monoplanes when it re-equipped with the North American O-47 in 1938. In the fall of 1940 the squadron was assigned to IV Corps and moved to Lawson Field, Georgia. At Lawson, one flight of the squadron was attached to the United States Army Infantry School at Fort Benning. This flight began to experiment with light aircraft, including the Stinson O-49 (later L-1) Vigilant, the Taylorcraft O-57 (Later L-2) Grasshopper and the Piper L-4 Grasshopper for cooperation with infantry units. Shortly before the United States entered World War II, the 97th was assigned to the 66th Observation Group.

=== World War II ===
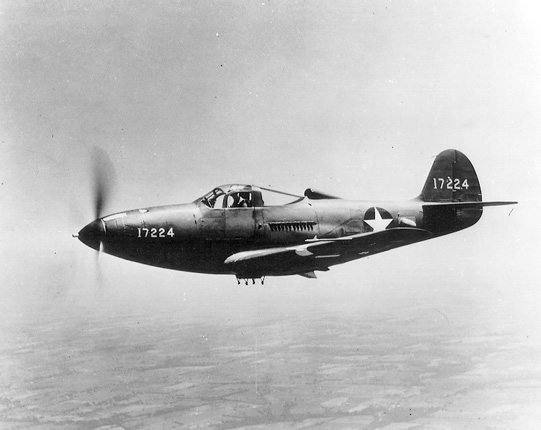
Bell P-39 Airacobra

One week after the Japanese attack on Pearl Harbor, the bulk of the squadron moved to Miami's 36th Street Airport, where, along with other units of I Air Support Command, it began to engage in antisubmarine patrols beginning on 18 December 1941. After May 1942, the squadron operated under the control of the Gulf Task Force. It continued these operations until September 1942, when the focus of German submarine attacks shifted away from the coast of the United States toward the Caribbean.

In early September 1942, the squadron left the Gulf Coast. It trained personnel for aerial reconnaissance and artillery spotting. It also supported ground forces on the Carolina maneuvers of 1942, the Tennessee maneuvers of 1942 and 1943 and the Second Army maneuvers of 1943–1944. In September 1943, the squadron moved to Thermal Army Air Field and participated in exercises in the Desert Training Center. However, the Army Air Forces found that standard military units, based on relatively inflexible tables of organization, were proving less well adapted to the training mission. Accordingly, it adopted a more functional system in which each base was organized into a separate numbered unit, while existing groups and squadrons were disbanded or inactivated. This resulted in the 97th, along with other units at Thermal, being disbanded in the spring of 1944 and being replaced by AAF Base Unit, which assumed the squadron's mission, personnel, and equipment.

=== From 1979 ===
In March 1979, the United States Air Force Security Service (USAFSS) activated the 6949th Security Squadron at Offutt Air Force Base, Nebraska. The squadron provided intelligence information to Strategic Air Command. When USAFSS became Electronic Security Command, the squadron became the 6949th Electronic Security Squadron.

In January 1980, the 6949th was expanded to a group and assigned the 6985th Electronic Security Squadron as a subordinate unit. Members of the 6985th flew aboard Cobra Ball RC-135 aircraft, collecting information on Soviet missile launches. On 15 March 1981, the Cobra Ball II aircraft crashed into a snowbank while attempting to land at Shemya Air Force Base, Alaska. Three members of the 6985th were killed in the crash. The group returned to squadron strength in August of that year.

The 6949th Electronic Security Squadron was consolidated with the 97th Tactical Reconnaissance Squadron in October 1993.

Members of the 97th have flown aboard a number of reconnaissance aircraft in addition to Cobra Ball, including the hog-nosed RC-135M, RC-135V, and RC-135W Rivet Joint aircraft designed to provide near real-time battle management information and electronic warfare support to theater commanders and combat forces.

Crews from the 45th Reconnaissance Squadron and the 97th Intelligence Squadron currently operate RC-135U Combat Sent aircraft, a highly specialized reconnaissance plane equipped with communications gear designed to locate and identify foreign military radar signals. The only two planes are assigned to the 55th Wing at Offutt Air Force Base "Combat Sent" crews include two airborne systems engineers, at least 10 electronic warfare officers and six or more technical and other specialists. In April 2014, a Russian Su-27 fighter intercepted one of the RC-135Us over the Sea of Okhotsk and flew in front of it, passing within 100 feet.

== Lineage ==
97th Aero Squadron

- Organized as the 97th Aero Squadron on 20 August 1917

Redesignated 97th Aero Squadron (Service) c. 5 September 1917
Demobilized on 3 February 1919

- Reconstituted c. 20 October 1936 and consolidated with the 97th Observation Squadron as the 97th Observation Squadron

97th Tactical Reconnaissance Squadron

- Constituted as the 97th Observation Squadron (Corps and Army) on 1 March 1935 and activated
- Consolidated with the 97th Aero Squadron 5 June 1936

Redesignated: 97th Observation Squadron (Medium) On 13 January 1942
Redesignated: 97th Observation Squadron on 4 July 1942
Redesignated: 97th Reconnaissance Squadron (Fighter) on 2 April 1943
Redesignated: 97th Tactical Reconnaissance Squadron on 11 August 1943

- Disbanded on 15 April 1944
- Reconstituted on 1 October 1993 and consolidated with the 6949th Security Squadron as the 97th Intelligence Squadron

97th Intelligence Squadron

- Designated as the 6949th Security Squadron and activated on 1 March 1979 (Note: The 6949th Security Squadron is not related to an earlier 6949th Security Squadron that absorbed the resources of Detachment 1, 6940th Security Wing on 1 July 1965 at Offutt and was inactivated on 1 September 1975. See Ravenstein, p. 12 (Major Command controlled organizations cannot pass lineage or honors to later units with the same designation).)

Redesignated 6949th Electronic Security Squadron on 1 August 1979
Redesignated 6949th Electronic Security Group on 1 January 1980
Redesignated 6949th Electronic Security Squadron on 1 August 1981

- Consolidated with the 97th Tactical Reconnaissance Squadron on 1 October 1993 as the 97th Intelligence Squadron

=== Assignments ===
- Unknown, probably:

Field Headquarters, Kelly Field 20 August 1917
Aviation General Supply Depot & Concentration Camp, 11 October 1917 – 27 October 1917

- Seventh Aviation Instruction Center, November 1917– December 1918
- Unknown: probably

Intermediate Section, Services of Supply, December 1918 – 10 January 1919
Air Service Depot, 20 January 1919 – 3 February 1919

- Second Corps Area, 1 March 1935 (Note: The squadron was nominally assigned to the 42d Observation Group until 17 July 1937 and then to the 43d Observation Group. The 42d was a "Regular Army, Inactive" unit and was manned only with Reserve officers. The 43d was not manned and in January 1941 it was withdrawn from the Third Corps Area and disbanded. Clay, p. 1321.)
- Third Corps Area, 17 July 1937
- IV Corps, 2 October 1940 (flight attached to Infantry School)
- 66th Observation Group (later 66th Reconnaissance Group, 66th Tactical Reconnaissance Group), 1 September 1941 (flight attached to Infantry School to 6 April 1942)
- 76th Tactical Reconnaissance Group, 23 August 1943 – 15 April 1944
- USAF Security Service (later Electronic Security Command), 1 March 1979
- Electronic Security, Strategic, 1 August 1981
- 694th Electronic Security Wing, 15 July 1988
- Continental Electronic Security Division, 1 January 1991
- 693d Intelligence Wing, 1 October 1991
- 67th Intelligence Group (later 67th Information Operations Group), 1 October 1993
- 55th Operations Group, 30 June 1993 – present

=== Components ===
- 6985th Electronic Security Squadron: 1 January 1980 – 1 August 1981

=== Stations ===
- Kelly Field, Texas, 20 August 1917
- Garden City, New York, 11 October 1917 – 27 October 1917
- Aulnat Aerodrome, Clermont-Ferrand, France, 15 November 1917
- Saint-Nazaire, France, 22 December 1918 – 10 January 1919
- Garden City, New York, 20 January 1919 – 3 February 1919
- Mitchel Field, New York, 1 March 1935
- Lawson Field, Georgia, 20 November 1940
- 36th Street Airport, Miami, Florida, 15 December 1941 (flight remained at Lawson Field to 15 April 1942)
- Tullahoma Army Air Base, Tennessee, 9 September 1942
- Morris Field, North Carolina, 8 November 1942
- Pope Field, North Carolina, c. 31 January 1943
- Camp Campbell, Kentucky, 5 April 1943
- Aiken Army Air Field, South Carolina, 22 June 1943
- Morris Field, North Carolina, 29 August 1943
- Thermal Army Air Field, California, 20 September 1943 – 15 April 1944
- Offutt Air Force Base, Nebraska, 1 March 1979 – present

=== Aircraft ===
- Curtiss O-1 Falcon, 1935–1937
- Douglas O-31, 1935–1937
- Curtiss O-39 Falcon, 1935–1937
- Curtiss Y1O-40 and O-40 Raven, 1935–1937
- Douglas O-43, 1935–1937
- Douglas O-46, 1936–1940
- North American O-47, 1938–1942
- Stinson O-49 (later L-1) Vigilant, 1941–1943
- Curtiss O-52 Owl, 1941–1942
- Taylorcraft O-57 Grasshopper, 1941–1942
- Bell P-39 Airacobra, 1942–1944
- Curtiss P-40 Warhawk, 1942–1943
- Republic P-43 Lancer, 1942–1943
- Douglas DB-7 and A-20 Havoc, 1942–1943
- Piper L-4 Grasshopper, 1942–1943

=== Awards and campaigns ===
Award streamer	Award	Dates	Notes
	Air Force Meritorious Unit Award	1 October 2002 – 31 May 2004	97th Intelligence Squadron
	Air Force Meritorious Unit Award	1 June 2004 – 31 May 2006	97th Intelligence Squadron
	Air Force Meritorious Unit Award	1 June 2006 – 31 May 2007	97th Intelligence Squadron
	Air Force Meritorious Unit Award	1 June 2007 – 31 May 2008	97th Intelligence Squadron
	Air Force Meritorious Unit Award	1 June 2008 – 31 May 2009	97th Intelligence Squadron
	Air Force Meritorious Unit Award	1 June 2009 – 31 May 2010	97th Intelligence Squadron
	Air Force Outstanding Unit Award	1 July 1983 – 30 June 1985	6949th Electronic Security Squadron
	Air Force Outstanding Unit Award	1 January 1990 – 31 December 1991	6949th Electronic Security Squadron
	Air Force Outstanding Unit Award	1 October 1993 – 30 September 1994	97th Intelligence Squadron
	Air Force Outstanding Unit Award	1 October 1994 – 30 September 1995	97th Intelligence Squadron
	Air Force Outstanding Unit Award	1 October 1995 – 30 September 1997	97th Intelligence Squadron
	Air Force Outstanding Unit Award	1 October 1997 – 30 September 1998	97th Intelligence Squadron
	Air Force Outstanding Unit Award	1 October 1990 – 30 September 2000	97th Intelligence Squadron
	Air Force Outstanding Unit Award	1 June 2001 – 31 May 2002	97th Intelligence Squadron

Campaign Streamer	Campaign	Dates	Notes
	Theater of Operations	22 December 1918 – 10 January 1919	97th Aero Squadron
	Antisubmarine	18 December 1941 – 9 September 1942	97th Observation Squadron

== See also ==
- List of American Aero Squadrons
- List of United States Air Force squadrons
- List of A-20 Havoc operators
