= Greenwood County Airport =

Airport in South Carolina

Greenwood County Airport Coronaca Army Airfield
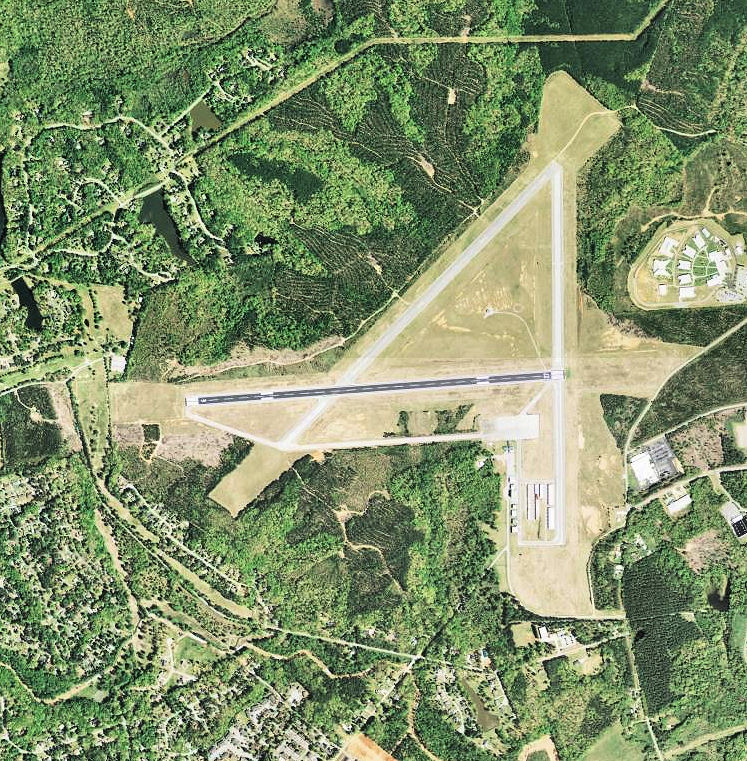
- Orthophoto from USGS
- IATA: GRD; ICAO: KGRD; FAA LID: GRD

Summary
- Airport type: Public
- Owner: Greenwood County
- Serves: Greenwood, South Carolina
- Location: unincorporated Greenwood County, South Carolina
- Elevation AMSL: 631 ft (192 m)
- Coordinates: 34°14′55″N 82°09′33″W

Map
- Location of airport in South Carolina

Runways
Direction	Length		Surface
Direction	ft	m	Surface
5/23	3,600	1,097	Asphalt
9/27	5,001	1,524	Concrete

Statistics (2022)
- Aircraft operations: 12,100
- Based aircraft: 53
- Source: Federal Aviation Administration

Greenwood County Airport (IATA: GRD, ICAO: KGRD, FAA LID: GRD) is a county-owned, public-use airport in unincorporated Greenwood County, South Carolina, United States, located 3 nautical miles (5.6 km) north of the central business district of Greenwood, a city in Greenwood County. It is included in the National Plan of Integrated Airport Systems for 2011–2015, which categorized it as a general aviation facility. The airport does not have scheduled commercial airline service.

== History ==
Greenwood County Airport opened in November 1943 as a United States Army Air Force military airfield called Coronaca Army Airfield. It was a sub-base of Greenville Army Air Base, supporting B-25 Mitchell medium bomber training for Third Air Force. Training was accomplished by the 50th Station Complement Squadron.

The military use of the airport ended on December 31, 1945 and the airfield was turned over to civil authorities and converted into a civil airport in 1947. It replaced the smaller Chinquapin Airport which was subsequently closed.

== Facilities and aircraft ==
Greenwood County Airport covers an area of 1,380 acres (558 ha) at an elevation of 631 feet (192 m) above mean sea level. It has two runways designated 5/23 with an asphalt surface measuring 3,600 by 60 feet (1,097 x 18 m), and 9/27 with an concrete surface measuring 5,001 by 100 feet (1,524 x 30 m).

For the 12-month period ending June 16, 2022, the airport had 12,100 aircraft operations, an average of 33 per day: 93% general aviation, 6% air taxi, and <1% military. At that time there were 53 aircraft based at this airport: 48 single-engine, and 5 multi-engine.

== See also ==
- South Carolina World War II Army Airfields
- List of airports in South Carolina
