= Florence Regional Airport =

Florence Regional Airport (former Florence Army Airfield)
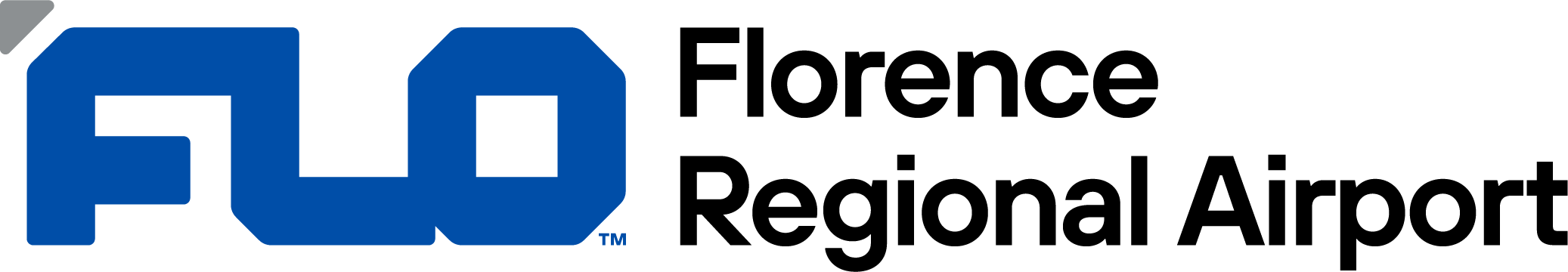

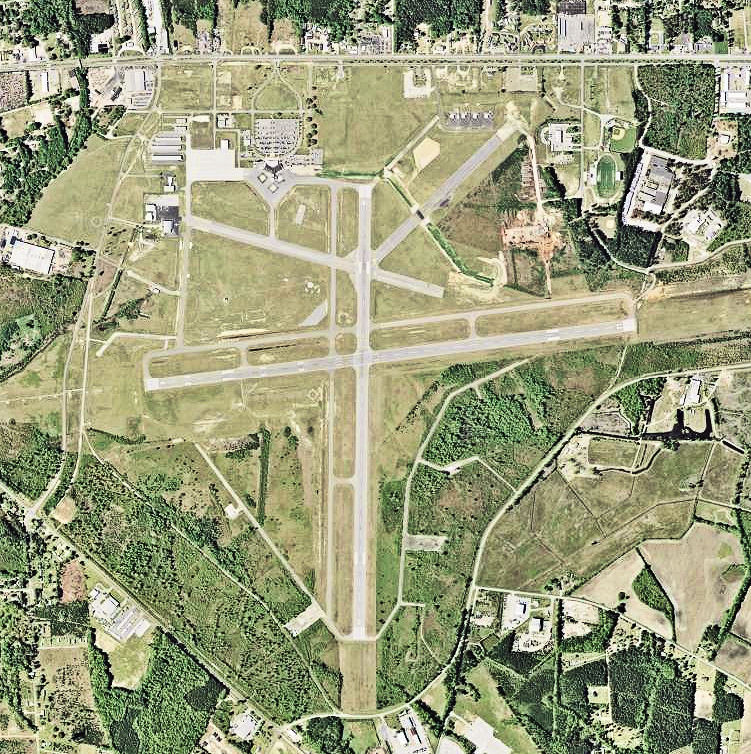
- IATA: FLO; ICAO: KFLO; FAA LID: FLO

Summary
- Airport type: Public
- Owner: Pee Dee Regional Airport Authority
- Serves: Florence, South Carolina
- Location: Florence County, near Florence, South Carolina
- Elevation AMSL: 146 ft (45 m)
- Coordinates: 34°11′07″N 079°43′26″W
- Website: www.flyflo.us

Map
- Location within South Carolina Location within the United States

Runways
| Direction | Length | | Surface |
| Direction | ft | m | Surface |
|---|---|---|---|
| 1/19 | 6,000 | 1,829 | Asphalt |
| 9/27 | 6,502 | 1,982 | Asphalt |

Statistics (2022)
- Aircraft operations (year ending 2/22/2022): 23,572
- Based aircraft: 47
- Sources: airport website and FAA

Florence Regional Airport (IATA: FLO, ICAO: KFLO, FAA LID: FLO) is three miles east of Florence, in Florence County, South Carolina, United States.

The only scheduled flights are American Eagle to Charlotte-Douglas International Airport.

== Facilities ==
The airport covers 1,436 acres (581 ha) and has two asphalt runways: 1/19 is 6,000 × 150 ft (1,829 × 46 m) and 9/27 is 6,502 × 150 ft (1,982 × 46 m).

In the year ending February 22, 2022, the airport had 23,572 aircraft operations, average 65 per day: 84% general aviation, 11% air taxi, 6% military, and <1% commercial. 47 aircraft were then based at the airport: 25% single-engine, 14 multi-engine, 2 jet, and 6 helicopters.

== Airline and destination ==
| Airlines | Destinations |
|---|---|
| American Eagle | Charlotte |

Destination map
Destination from Florence Regional Airport

=== Destination statistics ===
Busiest domestic routes from Florence (May 2023 – April 2024)
| Rank | City | Passengers |
|---|---|---|
| 1 | Charlotte, North Carolina | 23,290 |

== History ==
The airport began with the purchase of 300 acres (120 ha) in 1928. During World War II the United States Army Air Forces' Third Air Force used the airport as a training base and added 1,400 acres (570 ha). Known as Florence Army Airfield, the 52d Pursuit Group was assigned to the airfield on 18 February 1942 and trained with P-39 Airacobra and P-40 Warhawks until departing on 27 April for Wilmington, North Carolina.

A succession of Troop Carrier groups trained at Florence during 1943 those being the 63d, 65th, 313th and 315th prior to their deployment to Europe and North Africa. The airfield became a combat crew replacement training school for A-20 Havoc light bomber crews, with the 411th Bombardment Group being the Operational Training Unit at Florence AAF from 15 August 1943 until 1 May 1944.

After the 344th was inactivated, replacement training was taken over by the 334th Army Air Forces Base Unit (Replacement Training Unit, Light Bombardment). Support units at Florence AAF were the 407th Base Headquarters and Air Base Squadron; 10th Aviation Squadron; 958th Guard Squadron; 341st Sub-Depot; HQ, 411th Bombardment Group (Light).

Florence AAF controlled two auxiliary training bases for its A-20 training.

- Hartsville AAF Darlington, South Carolina 34°26′45″N 79°54′00″W
- Hartsville Auxiliary Field, Hartsville, South Carolina 34°24′00″N 80°02′30″W

In early 1945 the airfield was transferred to First Air Force and the 127th Army Air Forces Base unit (Combat Crew Training Station, Light) assumed the A-26 Invader training mission.

The property was given back to the City of Florence on 31 October 1945 and later shared with Florence County.

Eastern Airlines served FLO from 1948 to 1965; Piedmont Airlines flights (including Boeing 737s) ended in 1981. Air Carolina offered flights to Charlotte in the 1970s.

Operation of the airport was assigned to the Pee Dee Regional Airport Authority in 1999. The authority had nine representatives from the Pee Dee Regional Airport District, which includes the City of Florence, and the counties of Florence, Dillon and Marion.

== Florence Air & Missile Museum ==
From the 1960s until 1997 Florence was home to a large aviation museum, the Florence Air & Missile Museum. When it closed, the collection was divided among other museums in the United States.

== See also ==
- List of airports in South Carolina
- South Carolina World War II Army Airfields
