= Lane Airport =

Lane Airport Lane Intermediate Field (CAA Site #24)
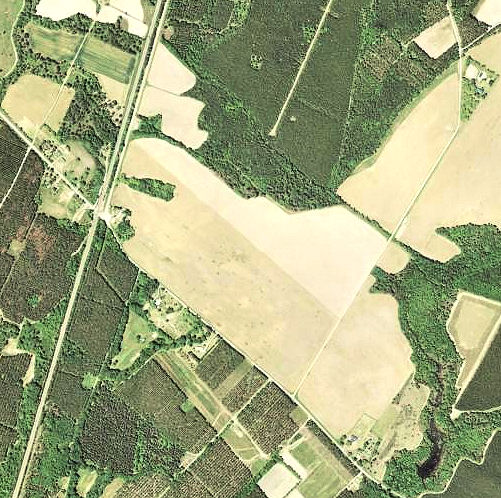
- 2006 USGS airphoto
- IATA: none; ICAO: none

Summary
- Serves: Lane, South Carolina
- Coordinates: 33°28′53″N 079°53′16″W

Map
- Location of Lane Airport

Runways
Direction	Length		Surface
Direction	ft	m	Surface
16/34	3,464	1,056	turf
9/27	3,347	1,020	turf

Lane Airport is a closed airport located 3 miles south of Lane, South Carolina.

== History ==
The airport was built prior to World War II, apparently by the Department of Commerce as part of the network of emergency aircraft landing fields which were set up in the 1920s and 1930s. Its purpose was to facilitate landings of commercial aircraft in emergency situations. It was a simple sod open field, about 2,800 × 2,300 feet, and perhaps had a rotating beacon for identification from the air.

During World War II, the airfield was used by the United States Army Air Forces from 1943 to 1945 as an auxiliary airfield with P-39 Airacobras assigned. It had a 3,400-foot unpaved runway and was used as an overflow field, likely by the training schools at Sumter and Congaree. It was listed as "Site 24, JX-RW" in the April 1944 US Army/Navy Directory of Airfields. The Army arranged for local civilians to provide temporary overnight accommodations and for mess services.

The military turned the facility over to the town of Lane after the war, leaving a single hangar, lighted runway, rotating beacon and lighted taxiways. It was also used occasionally by the military, with the occasional C-130 from Pope Air Force Base using it for practice landings on a turf runway.

The airport was used by general aviation for light aircraft until the early 1980s, when it was closed. Today, the former airport is an open field with agricultural crops.

== See also ==
- South Carolina World War II Army Airfields
