= Marlboro County Jetport =

Airport in Marlboro County, South Carolina

Marlboro County Jetport H.E. Avent Field Palmer Field
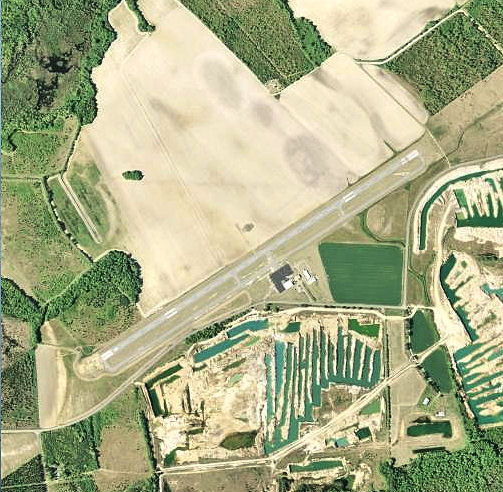
- 2006 USGS airphoto
- IATA: BTN; ICAO: KBBP; FAA LID: BBP

Summary
- Airport type: Public
- Owner: Marlboro County
- Serves: Bennettsville, South Carolina
- Location: Marlboro County, near Bennettsville, South Carolina
- Elevation AMSL: 147 ft / 45 m
- Coordinates: 34°37′18″N 79°44′04″W

Map
- Location of Marlboro County Jetport

Runways
Direction	Length		Surface
Direction	ft	m	Surface
7/25	5,003	1,524	Asphalt

Statistics (2018)
- Aircraft operations: 3,760
- Based aircraft: 12
- Source: Federal Aviation Administration

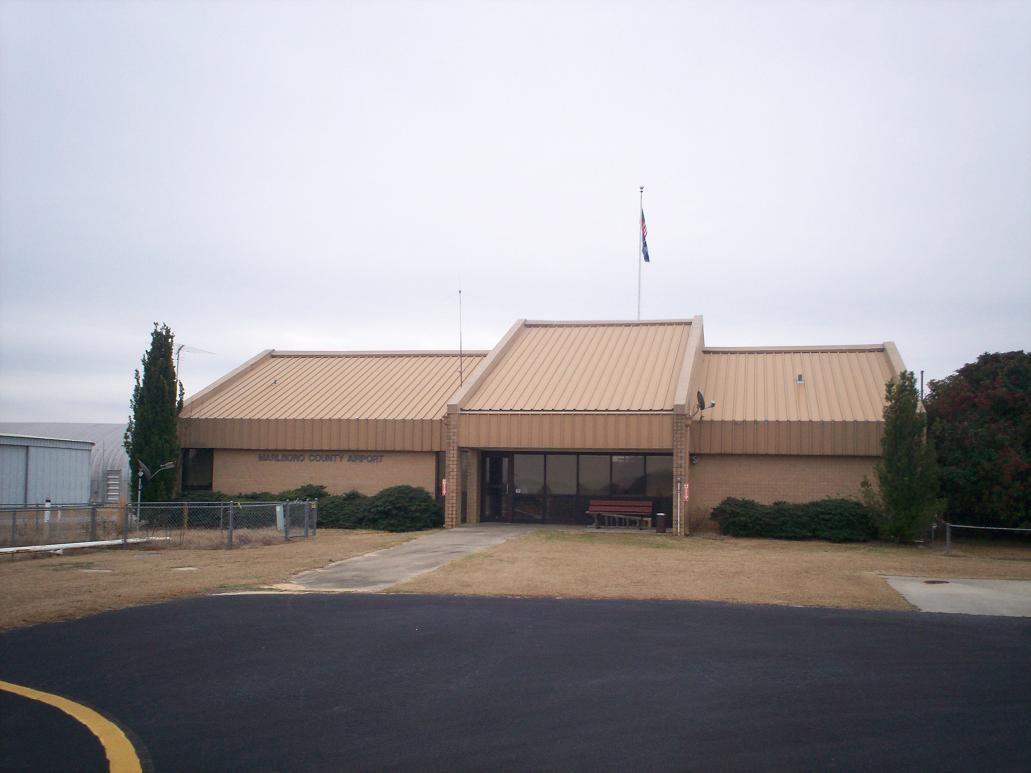
Terminal at Marlboro County Jetport

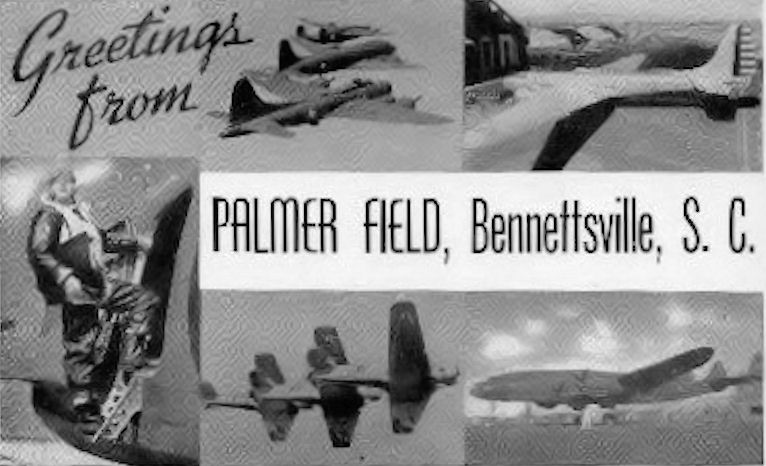
World War II Palmer Field postcard

Marlboro County Jetport (IATA: BTN, ICAO: KBBP, FAA LID: BBP), also known as H.E. Avent Field, is a county-owned public-use airport located 3 nautical miles (5.6 kilometres) west of the central business district of Bennettsville, in Marlboro County, South Carolina, United States.

Although most U.S. airports use the same three-letter location identifier for the FAA and IATA, this airport is assigned BBP by the FAA and BTN by the IATA.

== Facilities and aircraft ==
Marlboro County Jetport covers an area of 175 acres (71 ha) at an elevation of 147 feet (45 m) above mean sea level. It has one runway designated 7/25 with a 5,003 feet (1,525 m) by 74 feet (23 m) asphalt pavement. For the 12-month period ending 4 April 2018, the airport had 3,760 aircraft operations, an average of 10 per day: 98.4% general aviation and 1.6% air taxi. At that time there were 12 aircraft based at this airport, all single-engine.

== History ==
The airport opened on 8 October 1941 as Bennettsville Airport. It was renamed as Palmer Field in 1943 in honor of Capt. William White Palmer (1895-1934), Bennettsville native and World War I pilot. Palmer served in the 94th Aero Squadron in France during the war, shooting down three enemy aircraft. He was also awarded the Distinguished Service Cross and French Croix de Guerre for gallantry in aerial combat.

During World War II, United States Army Air Forces flying cadets were provided flight training under contract to Georgia Air Service, Inc & Southeastern Air Service, Inc., under the 53d Army Air Forces Flying Training Detachment (later 2152d Army Air Force Base Unit). The airfield was assigned to United States Army Air Forces East Coast Training Center (later Eastern Flying Training Command) as a primary (level 1) pilot training airfield. It had a 4,700' irregular all-direction turf field for landings and takeoffs. It may have had four auxiliary airfields, although none have been identified. Flying training was performed with Fairchild PT-19s as the primary trainer. It also had several PT-17 Stearmans assigned.

The airfield was inactivated on 16 October 1944 with the drawdown of AAFTC's pilot training program. It was declared surplus and turned over to the Army Corps of Engineers on 30 September 1945. It was eventually discharged to the War Assets Administration (WAA) and became a civil airport.

== See also ==
- South Carolina World War II Army Airfields
- 29th Flying Training Wing (World War II)
- List of airports in South Carolina
