= Chinquapin Airport =

Airport in South Carolina, United States

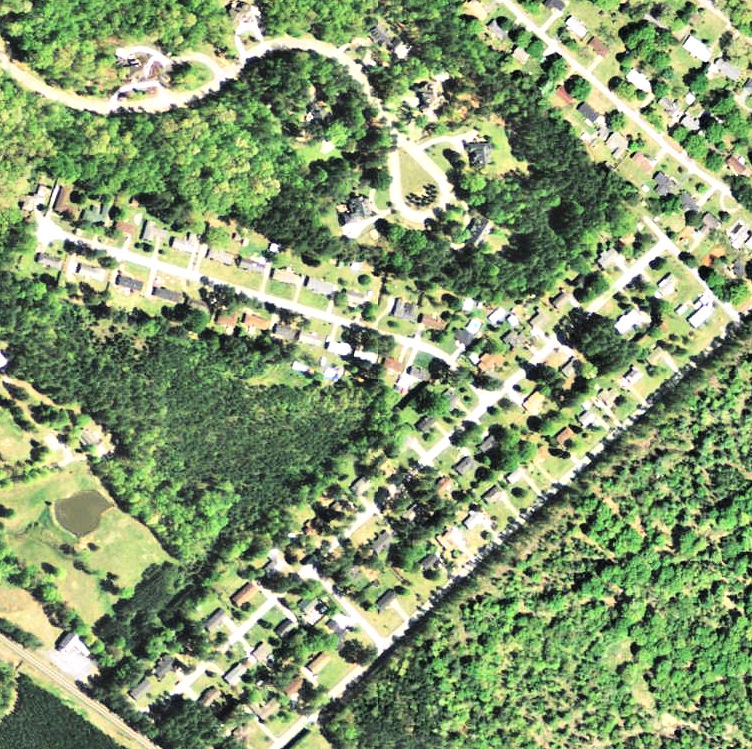
- 2006 USGS airphoto
- IATA: none; ICAO: none

Summary
- Serves: Greenwood, South Carolina
- Coordinates: 34°11′18″N 082°12′17″W

Map
- Location of Chinquapin Airport

Chinquapin Airport is a former airport located 2.5 miles west of Greenwood, South Carolina. It was closed after World War II, with all flight operations being moved to the Greenwood County Airport north of the city.

== History ==
Chinquapin Airport, also known as Greenwood Municipal Airport and Johnson Field, was built in the mid-1930s by the Works Progress Administration. It replaced a smaller Greenwood Municipal Airport which was built in the late 1920s that was being encroached by the city of Greenwood. It had two grass or dirt runways, reportedly 2,300' & 2,000' long.

The fixed-base operator (FBO) at the airport was Johnson Air Services, which operated a flying school at the airport. In 1940, the school began government-sponsored flight training. Both flight instruction and ground school training were conducted for CAA pilot licensing using about 15 Piper J-3 Cubs. The civil flight training continued at the airport even after the United States entry into World War II.

Beginning about 1944, the United States Army Air Forces supplied civil flight instructors under contract to screen potential air cadets for military flight training bused in from nearby Erskine College. This was part of a program to reduce the failure rate at the military flight schools. The Air Force supplied about 10-15 instructors, and each of the flight screening classes consisted of about 60 potential flight cadets.

With the end of the war, the Air Force closed Coronaca Army Airfield north of Greenwood, and it was subsequently deeded to Greenwood County in 1947. Flight operations were then moved to the former military training school, it being reopened as Greenwood County Airport.

Chinquapin Airport was closed, the property sold in 1948 and the land was redeveloped into a housing development. The hangars at the airport were moved to the new airport. The runways were subsequently converted into streets. One runway is now Marietta Drive, and the other is Westgate Drive, with houses built along each side of the streets.

== See also ==
- South Carolina World War II Army Airfields
