= Grand Strand Airport =

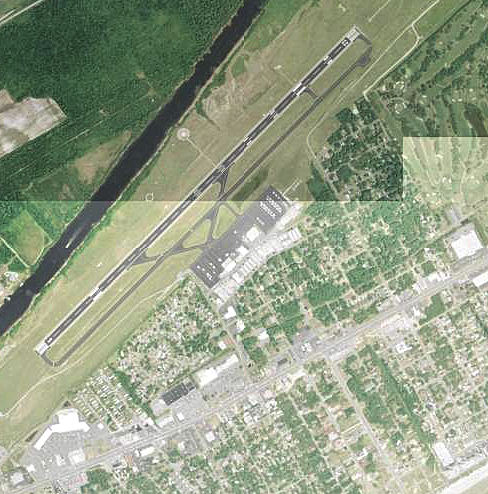
- 2006 USGS airphoto
- IATA: CRE; ICAO: KCRE; FAA LID: CRE

Summary
- Airport type: Public
- Owner: Horry County
- Serves: North Myrtle Beach, South Carolina
- Elevation AMSL: 32 ft (9.8 m)
- Coordinates: 33°48′42″N 078°43′26″W

Map
- Location of Grand Strand Airport

Runways
Direction	Length		Surface
Direction	ft	m	Surface
5/23	5,997	1,828	Asphalt

Statistics (2021)
- Aircraft operations (year ending 5/6/2021): 35,772
- Based aircraft: 38
- Source: Federal Aviation Administration

Grand Strand Airport (IATA: CRE, ICAO: KCRE, FAA LID: CRE) is a county-owned, public-use airport located one nautical mile (1.85 km) northwest of the central business district of North Myrtle Beach, in Horry County, South Carolina, United States. The name Grand Strand refers to a nearby 60-mile stretch of beach; its code CRE refers to nearby Crescent Beach.

This airport is included in the FAA's National Plan of Integrated Airport Systems (2009–2013), which categorizes it as a general aviation airport.

== Facilities and aircraft ==
Grand Strand Airport covers an area of 427 acres (173 ha) at an elevation of 32 feet (10 m) above mean sea level. It has one runway designated 5/23 with an asphalt surface measuring 5,997 by 100 feet (1,828 x 30 m).

For the 12-month period ending May 6, 2021, the airport had 35,772 aircraft operations, an average of 98 per day: 80% general aviation, 17% air taxi, and 3% military. At that time there were 38 aircraft based at this airport: 29 single-engine, 7 multi-engine, 1 jet and 1 helicopter.

== History ==
The origins of the airport are undetermined; however, it was likely built during World War II by the United States Army Air Forces. Known as Wampee Flight Strip, it was used as an auxiliary landing airfield for Myrtle Beach Army Airfield. It was closed after World War II, and was turned over for local government use by the War Assets Administration (WAA).

Beginning in 1956, this was the commercial airport for Myrtle Beach and other Grand Strand communities, primarily being serviced by Piedmont Airlines. It was used until the opening of what is now Myrtle Beach International Airport in 1976 at Myrtle Beach AFB.

Since 1976, the airport has been used by general aviation, primarily serving the North Myrtle Beach area.

== See also ==
- List of airports in South Carolina
- South Carolina World War II Army Airfields
