= Barnwell Regional Airport =

Airport in Barnwell County, South Carolina

Barnwell Regional Airport Barnwell Army Airfield
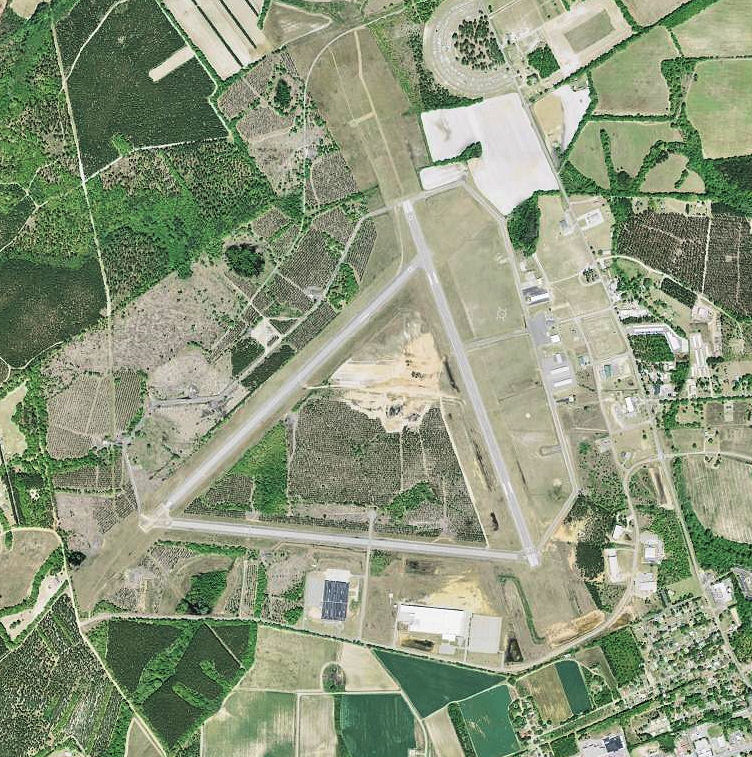
- USGS 2006 orthophoto
- IATA: BNL; ICAO: KBNL; FAA LID: BNL

Summary
- Airport type: Public
- Owner: Barnwell County
- Serves: Barnwell, South Carolina
- Elevation AMSL: 246 ft (75 m)
- Coordinates: 33°15′28″N 81°23′18″W

Map
- Location within South Carolina

Runways
| Direction | Length | | Surface |
| Direction | ft | m | Surface |
|---|---|---|---|
| 17/35 | 5,119 | 1,560 | Asphalt |
| 5/23 | 4,526 | 1,380 | Asphalt |

Statistics (2018)
- Aircraft operations: 5,750
- Based aircraft: 26
- Source: Federal Aviation Administration

Barnwell Regional Airport (IATA: BNL, ICAO: KBNL, FAA LID: BNL) is a county-owned, public-use airport located 1 nautical mile (1.9 kilometres) northwest of the central business district of Barnwell, a city in Barnwell County, South Carolina, United States. It is owned by Barnwell County. The airport serves the general aviation community, with no scheduled commercial airline service.

== History ==
The airport was built by the United States Army Air Forces and opened in May 1943. Barnwell Army Airfield was a satellite airfield of Columbia Army Air Base, supporting B-25 Mitchell medium bomber training for Third Air Force III Air Support Command. Training was accomplished by 44th Station Complement Squadron which also maintained the facility. After the war, the airfield was turned over to local authorities which converted it into a civil airport.

== Facilities and aircraft ==
Barnwell Regional Airport covers an area of 859 acres (348 ha) at an elevation of 246 feet (75 m) above mean sea level. It has two asphalt paved runways: 17/35 is 5,119 feet (1,560 m) by 100 feet (30 m) and 5/23 is 4,526 feet (1,380 m) by 70 feet (21 m).

For the 12-month period ending 29 October 2018, the airport had 5,750 aircraft operations, an average of 16 per day: 80% general aviation, 7% air taxi, and 13% military. At that time there were 26 aircraft based at this airport, all of them single-engine.

== See also ==
- South Carolina World War II Army Airfields
- List of airports in South Carolina
