= Darlington County Airport =

Airport in South Carolina

Darlington County Airport (Jetport) Hartsville Army Airfield
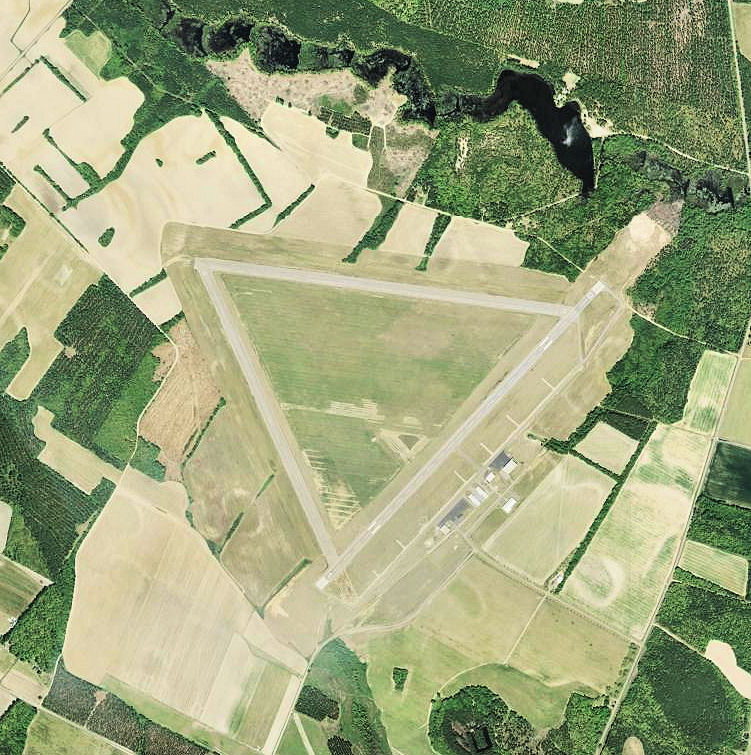
- Orthophoto from USGS
- IATA: none; ICAO: KUDG; FAA LID: UDG

Summary
- Airport type: Public
- Owner: Darlington County
- Serves: Darlington, South Carolina
- Elevation AMSL: 192 ft (59 m)
- Coordinates: 34°26′58″N 79°53′24″W

Map
- Location of airport in South Carolina

Runways
Direction	Length		Surface
Direction	ft	m	Surface
5/23	5,500	1,676	Asphalt
10/28	4,947	1,508	Asphalt
16/34	4,751	1,448	Asphalt

Statistics (2011)
- Aircraft operations: 8,200
- Based aircraft: 11
- Source: Federal Aviation Administration

Darlington County Airport (Jetport) (ICAO: KUDG, FAA LID: UDG) is a county-owned, public-use airport located nine nautical miles (10 mi, 17 km) north of the central business district of Darlington, a city in Darlington County, South Carolina, United States. It is included in the National Plan of Integrated Airport Systems for 2011–2015, which categorized it as a general aviation facility. The airport does not have scheduled commercial airline service.

Although many U.S. airports use the same three-letter location identifier for the FAA and IATA, this facility is assigned UDG by the FAA but has no designation from the IATA.

== History ==
The airport was opened in October 1943. It was built by the United States Army Air Force, and known as Hartsville Army Airfield. It was used as an auxiliary training base for Florence Army Airfield, located 18 miles southeast. It was built as a bomber airfield, and supported A-20 Havocs, and later A-26 Invaders which were based at Florence. Its base unit was the 82nd Station Complement Squadron, which maintained the airfield and provided service to the aircraft.

Military use of the airfield ended early in 1945, and it was turned over to civil authorities which converted it into a civil airport.

From late 1978 to early 1979, the airport was the site of a major international drug smuggling operation run by a group of conspirators known as The Company. Early on the morning on January 17, 1979, 1380 pounds of marijuana arrived at the airport in a twin engine Cessna 404 Titan II aircraft reportedly traveling in from Colombia, South America. Unbeknownst to the smugglers, the operation was being tracked by law enforcement agents. As the aircraft was being unloaded, agents converged on the airport and arrested fifteen individuals, including George Gedra, the airport manager and owner of the FBO, Gedra Air Service. Gedra reportedly arrived at the airport early that morning to open up the facilities for the smugglers and to turn on the runway lights for the landing Cessna. Police found Gedra hiding under the desk in his office. As he was being arrested, his telephone rang and the caller asked to speak to Gedra about a second load.

== Facilities and aircraft ==
Darlington County Airport (Jetport) covers an area of 635 acres (257 ha) at an elevation of 192 feet (59 m) above mean sea level. It has three asphalt paved runways: 5/23 is 5,500 by 100 feet (1,676 x 30 m); 10/28 is 4,947 by 150 feet (1,508 x 46 m); 16/34 is 4,751 by 150 feet (1,448 x 46 m).

For the 12-month period ending April 21, 2011, the airport had 8,200 aircraft operations, an average of 22 per day: 93% general aviation, 6% air taxi, and 1% military. At that time there were 11 aircraft based at this airport: 82% single-engine and 18% jet.

== See also ==
- South Carolina World War II Army Airfields
- List of airports in South Carolina
