= Charleston Executive Airport =

Airport in South Carolina

Charleston Executive Airport Johns Island Army Airfield

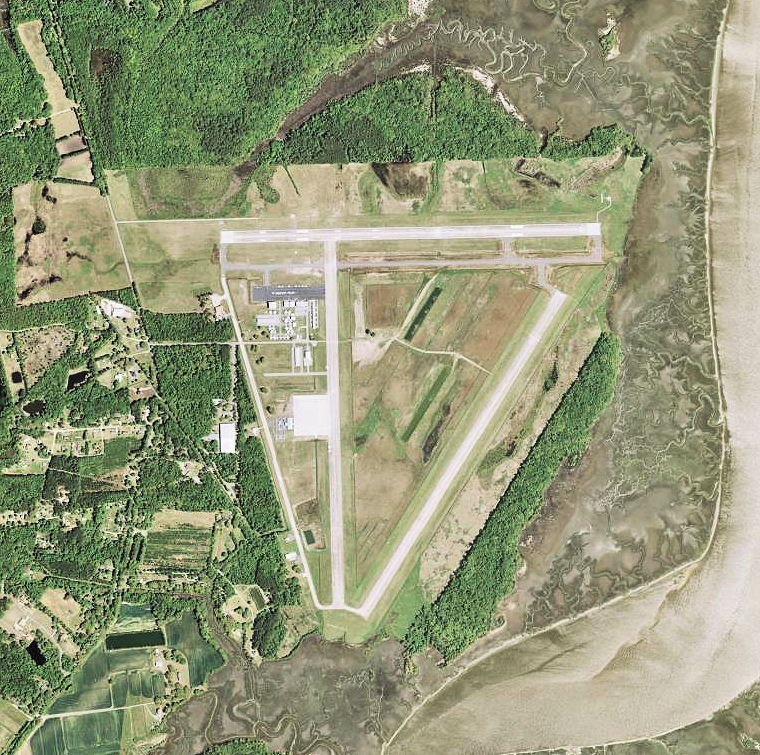
- USGS image, 2006
- IATA: none; ICAO: KJZI; FAA LID: JZI

Summary
- Airport type: Public
- Owner: Charleston County Aviation Authority
- Serves: Charleston, South Carolina
- Elevation AMSL: 19 ft (5.8 m)
- Coordinates: 32°42′03″N 80°00′10″W

Map
- Location within South Carolina

Runways
Direction	Length		Surface
Direction	ft	m	Surface
9/27	5,350	1,631	Concrete
4/22	4,313	1,315	Concrete

Statistics (2019)
- Aircraft operations: 31,000
- Based aircraft: 39
- Source: Federal Aviation Administration

Charleston Executive Airport (ICAO: KJZI, FAA LID: JZI) is in Charleston in Charleston County, South Carolina, seven miles southwest of the city. It is owned by the Charleston County Aviation Authority. The airport serves the general aviation community, with no airline service.

== History ==
The airport opened in April 1943 named Johns Island Army Airfield. Initially it was an auxiliary to Columbia Army Air Base as an unmanned emergency landing airfield. On 31 March 1944, jurisdiction was transferred to Charleston Army Airfield when Charleston was reassigned to Air Transport Command. It served as an emergency landing base with no permanent structures being used for transatlantic flights. On 25 August 1945, the airfield was turned over to local authorities which converted it into a civil airport. The occasional military aircraft still uses the airport.

== Facilities ==
The airport covers 1,373 acres (556 ha) at an elevation of 19 feet (5.8 m). It has two concrete runways: 9/27 is 5,350 by 150 feet (1,631 x 46 m) and 4/22 is 4,313 by 150 feet (1,315 x 46 m).

In the year ending December 11, 2019 the airport had 31,000 aircraft operations, an average of 85 per day. The operations breakdown was: 84% general aviation, 9.5% military, and 6.5% air taxi. 39 aircraft were then based at this airport: 90% single-engine, 5% multi-engine, and 5% jet.

== See also ==
- South Carolina World War II Army Airfields
- List of airports in South Carolina
