= Jim Hamilton–L.B. Owens Airport =

Airport in Columbia, South Carolina

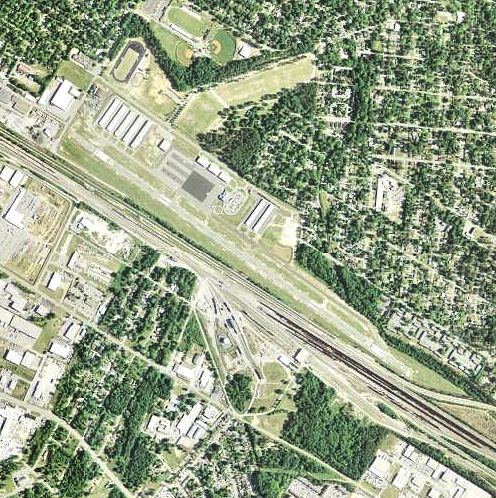
- 2006 USGS airphoto
- IATA: CUB; ICAO: KCUB; FAA LID: CUB

Summary
- Airport type: Public
- Owner: County of Richland
- Serves: Columbia, South Carolina
- Elevation AMSL: 194 ft (59 m)
- Coordinates: 33°58′14″N 080°59′43″W

Map
- Location of Jim Hamilton–L.B. Owens Airport

Runways
Direction	Length		Surface
Direction	ft	m	Surface
13/31	5,011	1,527	Asphalt

Statistics (2021)
- Aircraft operations (year ending 3/30/2021): 25,000
- Based aircraft: 105
- Source: Federal Aviation Administration

Jim Hamilton–L.B. Owens Airport (IATA: CUB, ICAO: KCUB, FAA LID: CUB), known locally as Owens Field, is a county-owned public-use airport located two nautical miles (3.7 km) south of the central business district of Columbia, in Richland County, South Carolina, United States. In 2008, the airport was renamed in honor of former airport manager Jim Hamilton. It was formerly known as Columbia Owens Downtown Airport.

== History ==
The airport was the main municipal airport serving Columbia, South Carolina, prior to World War II. It was named Columbia Municipal Airport, and on April 24, 1930, the new airport was dedicated. In celebration, an airshow with more than 15,000 people attending saw notable aviators like the President of the Curtiss Flying Service, Casey Jones, Bill Winston (the flying instructor of Charles Lindbergh), and Elliot White Springs.

Eastern Air Transport began passenger and airmail service to Owens Field in 1932. Delta Air Lines began its first scheduled services out of Columbia's new airport in 1934.

Just prior to World War II, some Air Corps operations from the 65th Observation Group flew observation flights from the airport, until Columbia Army Air Base opened in 1941. During the war, it was used by the Army Air Forces Third Air Force as a training field for reconnaissance and observation pilots while remaining a commercial airport. It also served as a military airport, serving the needs of Fort Jackson. President Franklin D. Roosevelt landed at Columbia Airport during a visit to Columbia. The United States Navy also used Owens Field as a military airport. In addition, the military officials at the airport controlled a Prisoner of War Camp at Walterboro, where some 350 POWs were sent who worked on farms and other tasks. After the war, the airport returned to commercial use.

After the war, the airport was renamed Owens Field for Columbia Mayor Lawrence B. Owens, who was one of the most ardent supporters of a municipal airport. Owens Field remained the commercial airport for Columbia until airline service was relocated to the larger Columbia Metropolitan Airport near Cayce in 1947 when the Air Force released its former World War II base to Lexington County. Owens Field's location near downtown made expansion all but impossible. Since then Owens Downtown Airport has served the general aviation community of Columbia and the midlands.

== Facilities and aircraft ==
Jim Hamilton–L.B. Owens Airport covers an area of 182 acres (74 ha) at an elevation of 194 feet (59 m) above mean sea level. It has one runway designated 13/31 with an asphalt surface measuring 5,011 by 75 feet (1,527 x 23 m).

For the 12-month period ending 30 March 2021, the airport had 25,000 aircraft operations, an average of 68 per day: 81% general aviation, 15% air taxi, and 4% military. At that time there were 105 aircraft based at this airport: 93 single-engine, 6 multi-engine, 2 jet, 3 helicopters, and 1 gliders.

== See also ==
- List of airports in South Carolina
- South Carolina World War II Army Airfields
