= Aiken Regional Airport =

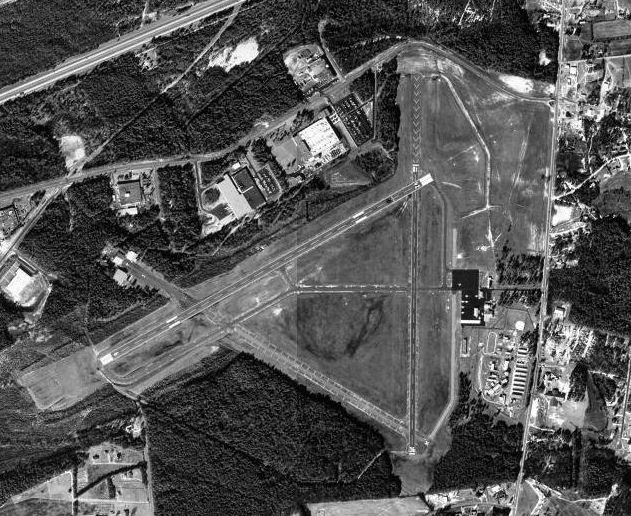
- USGS aerial image as of 19 January 1994
- IATA: AIK; ICAO: KAIK; FAA LID: AIK

Summary
- Airport type: Public
- Owner: City of Aiken
- Serves: Aiken, South Carolina
- Location: Aiken County, near Aiken, South Carolina
- Elevation AMSL: 528 ft (161 m)
- Coordinates: 33°38′58″N 081°41′06″W
- Website: AikenRegionalAirport.com/...

Map
- Location within South Carolina

Runways
Direction	Length		Surface
Direction	ft	m	Surface
7/25	5,500	1,676	Asphalt
1/19	3,800	1,158	Asphalt

Statistics (2023)
- Aircraft operations (year ending 7/13/2023): 28,300
- Based aircraft: 47
- Source: Federal Aviation Administration

Aiken Regional Airport (IATA: AIK, ICAO: KAIK, FAA LID: AIK) is a city-owned public-use airport located five nautical miles (9 km) north of the central business district of Aiken, a city in Aiken County, South Carolina, United States. The airport serves the general aviation community, with no scheduled commercial airline service. Formerly, it was Aiken Air Force Station.

== Facilities and aircraft ==
Aiken Regional Airport covers an area of 700 acres (280 ha) at an elevation of 528 feet (161 m) above mean sea level. It has two asphalt paved runways: 7/25 is 5,500 by 100 feet (1,676 x 30 m) and 1/19 is 3,800 by 75 feet (1,158 x 23 m).

For the 12-month period ending July 13, 2023, the airport had 28,300 aircraft operations, an average of 77 per day: 93% general aviation, 6% air taxi and 1% military. At that time there were 47 aircraft based at this airport, 38 single-engine, 7 multi-engine, and 2 jet.

== See also ==
- List of airports in South Carolina
