= Morris Army Airfield =

Former military airfield at closed Ft. Gillem, GA, US

Morris Army Airfield (Fort Gillem)
- IATA: FOP; ICAO: none; FAA LID: 65GA

Summary
- Airport type: Military
- Owner: United States Army
- Location: Forest Park, Clayton County, Georgia, United States
- Elevation AMSL: 966 ft / 294 m
- Coordinates: 33°37′20″N 084°20′23″W

Map
- Location of Morris Army Airfield

Runways
Direction	Length		Surface
Direction	ft	m	Surface
15/33	10,000	3,048	Asphalt
- Source: Federal Aviation Administration

Morris Army Airfield (IATA: FOP, FAA LID: 65GA) was a military airport located at Fort Gillem, within the city of Forest Park in Clayton County, Georgia, southwest of the city of Atlanta, Georgia, just 3.8 miles (6.1 km) east of the Hartsfield–Jackson Atlanta International Airport.

== See also ==
- Fort Gillem
- Fort McPherson
