= Curtiss O-52 Owl =

US Army WWII observation aircraft

O-52
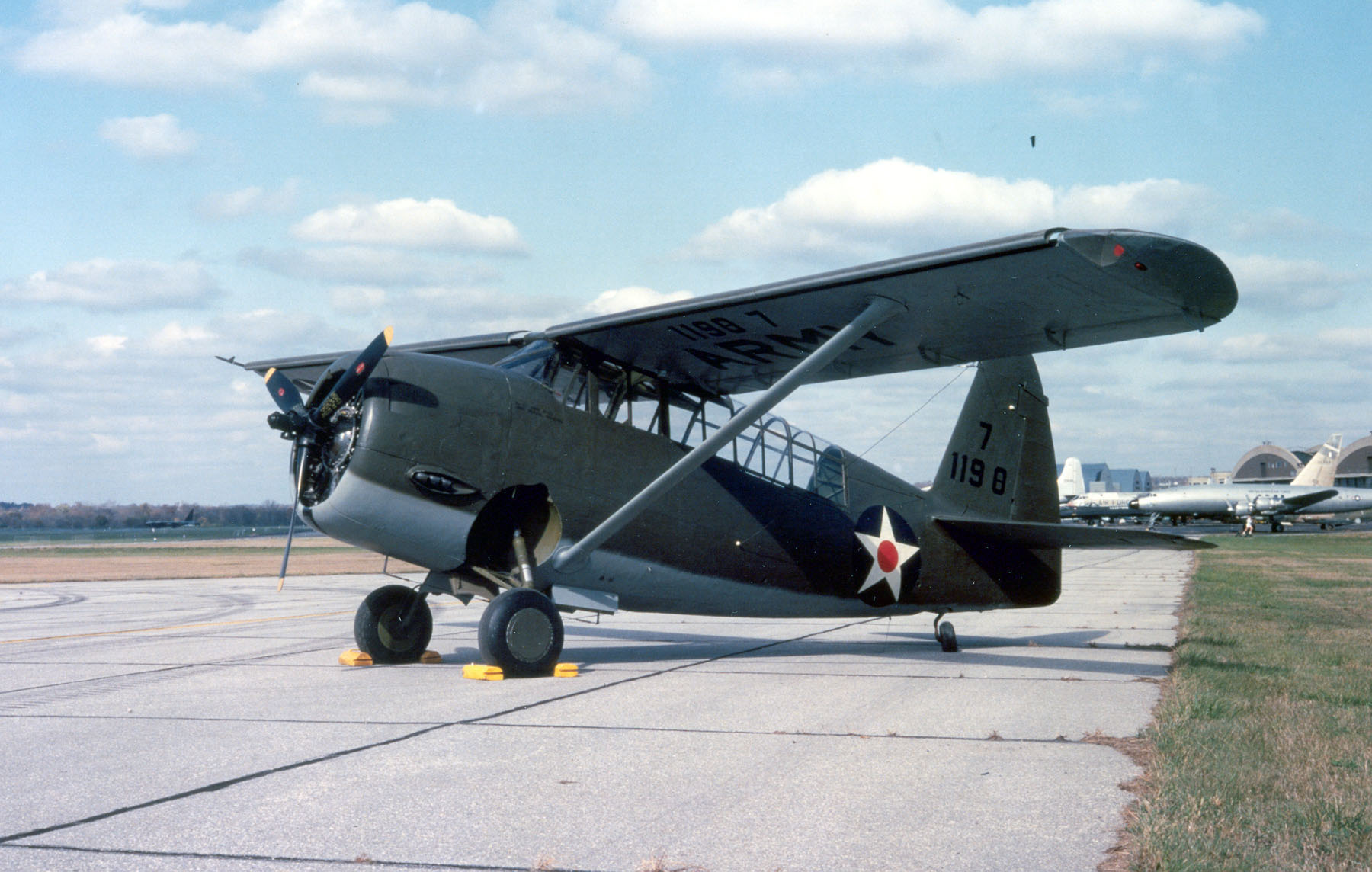
- The O-52 at National Museum of the United States Air Force

General information
- Type: Reconnaissance
- Manufacturer: Curtiss-Wright
- Primary users: United States Army Air Corps Soviet Air Forces
- Number built: 203

History
- Introduction date: 1941
- First flight: 1940

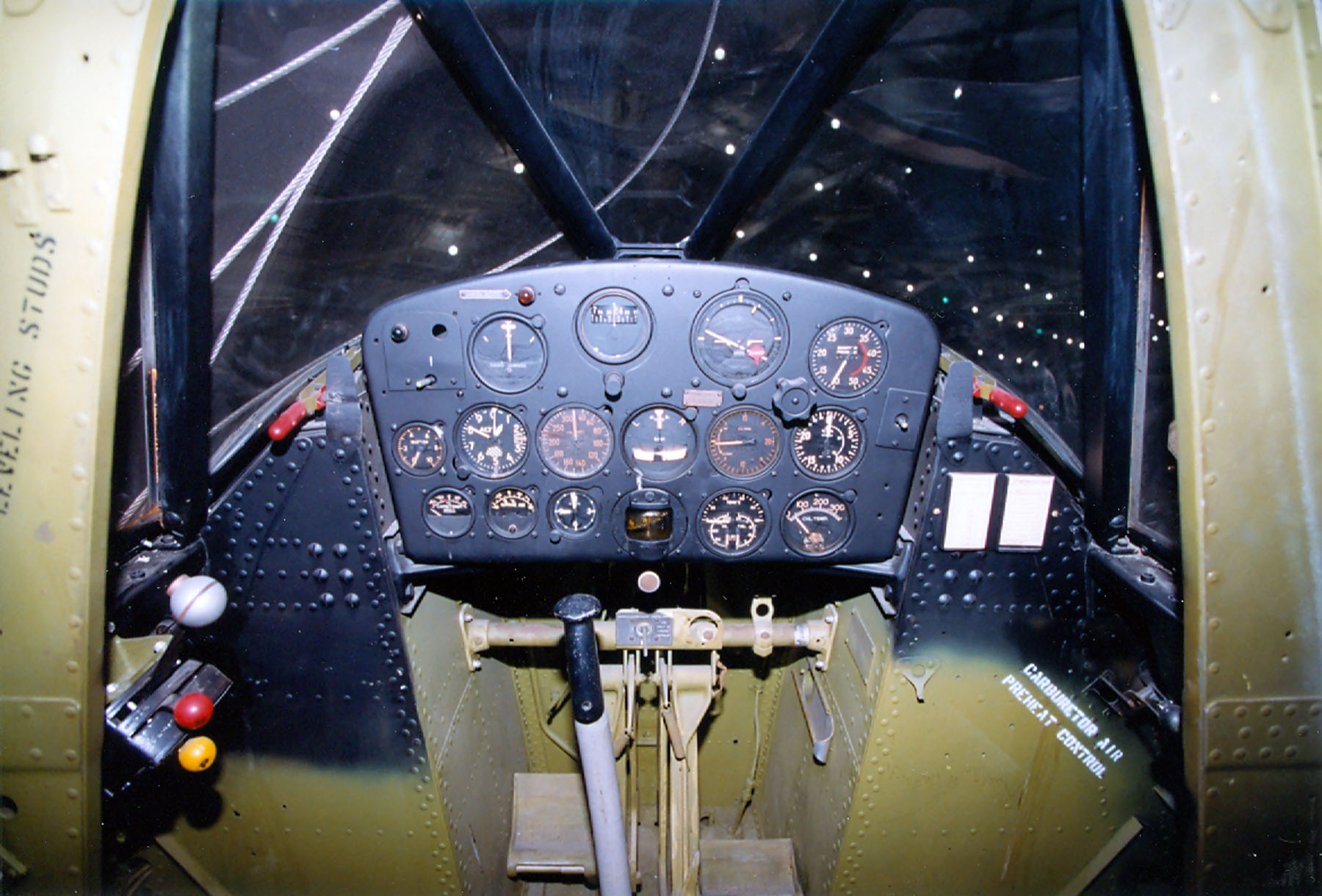
Cockpit of a Curtiss O-52 in a museum

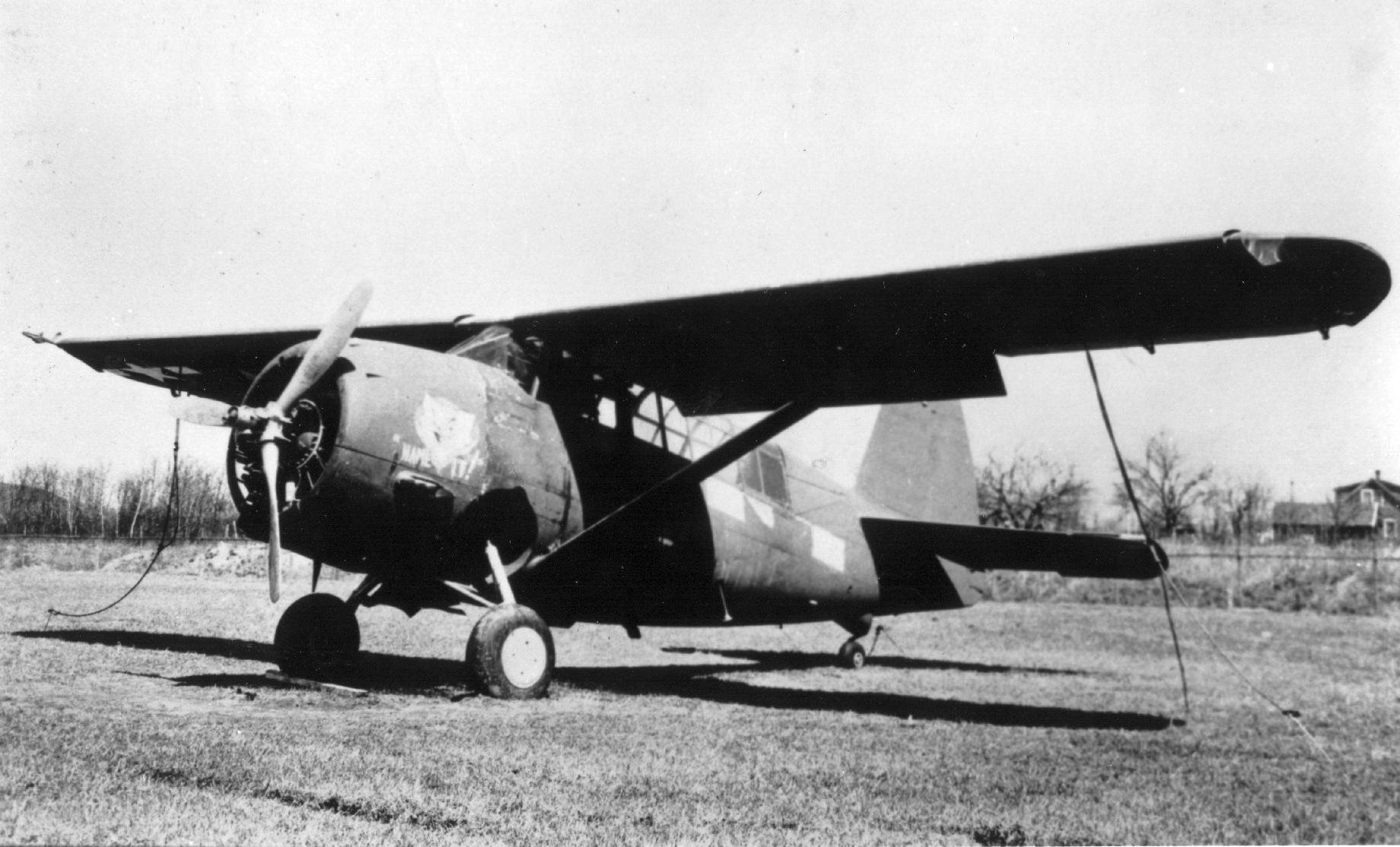
An O-52

The Curtiss O-52 Owl is an observation aircraft used by the United States Army Air Corps before and during World War II. They were used for anti-submarine searches in the Americas and by lend-lease also used on the Eastern Front in Europe by the Soviets.

== Design and development ==
Developed in 1939, the Curtiss O-52 was the last "heavy" observation aircraft developed for the US Army Air Corps. The concept of the two-seat observation aircraft, classed as the "O" series aircraft, dated to World War I, and in 1940, the Army Air Corps ordered 203 Curtiss O-52s for observation duties.

Curtis designated it the Curtiss Model 85, and it was powered by a Pratt & Whitney Wasp radial engine.

== Operational history ==
Upon delivery, the aircraft was used in military maneuvers with the USAAC, but following America's entry into World War II, the USAAF determined that the aircraft did not possess sufficient performance for "modern" combat operations in overseas areas. As a result, the O-52 was relegated to courier duties within the U.S. and short-range submarine patrol over the Gulf of Mexico and Atlantic and Pacific Oceans

O-52s were used by the 2nd Reconnaissance Squadron, which flew them out of Puerto Rico and Trinidad, to search for Nazi U Boats.

The O-52 was the last "O" type aircraft procured in quantity for the Air Corps. Following the attack on Pearl Harbor, the "O" designation was discontinued and the "L" series for liaison-type aircraft was adopted instead.

In November 1942, the USSR ordered 30 O-52 Owls through the Lend-Lease program. Twenty-six were shipped, with only 19 delivered as a number were lost on the North Arctic Route. Of these only ten were accepted into service. They were used operationally for artillery fire spotting and general photographic and observation platforms in north and central areas on the Russian Front during spring–summer 1943. One O-52 was shot down by Luftwaffe fighters. In the report on military tests, the Soviet pilots recognized that the American machine was superior to the outdated Polikarpov R-5, and Polikarpov R-Z spotters used at the front. The aircraft was generally disliked in Soviet use although some were still flying into the 1950s.

== Operators ==
Brazil

- Brazilian Air Force

United States

- United States Army Air Corps

Soviet Union

- Soviet Air Force

== Surviving aircraft ==
- 40-2746 – O-52 on static display at the Pima Air & Space Museum in Tucson, Arizona.
- 40-2763 – O-52 on static display at the National Museum of the United States Air Force in Dayton, Ohio.
- 40-2769 – O-52 on display at the Yanks Air Museum in Chino, California.
- 40-2804 – O-52 under restoration in Huntington, Indiana. It was previously part of the Walter Soplata collection.

== Specifications (O-52) ==

Data from Curtiss Aircraft 1907–1947, American Warplanes of World War II

General characteristics

- Crew: 2
- Length: 26 ft 4.25 in (8.0328 m)
- Wingspan: 40 ft 9 in (12.42 m)
- Height: 9 ft 11.5 in (3.035 m)
- Wing area: 210 sq ft (20 m^{2})
- Empty weight: 4,231 lb (1,919 kg)
- Gross weight: 5,364 lb (2,433 kg)
- Powerplant: 1 × Pratt & Whitney R-1340-51 Wasp 9-cylinder air-cooled radial piston engine, 600 hp (450 kW)
- Propellers: 3-bladed metal propeller

Performance

- Maximum speed: 220 mph (350 km/h, 190 kn)
- Cruise speed: 192 mph (309 km/h, 167 kn) at 75% power
- Time to altitude: 10,000 ft (3,000 m)

Armament

- Guns: 1 × fixed forward-firing 0.30 in (7.62 mm) machine gun and 1 × 0.30 in (7.62 mm) machine-gun on a flexible mount in the rear cockpit

== See also ==
Aircraft of comparable role, configuration, and era

- Curtiss XF13C
- Douglas O-38
- Fieseler Storch
- North American O-47
- Thomas-Morse O-19
- Westland Lysander
