= Elliott Roosevelt (general) =

American military official and politician (1910–1990)

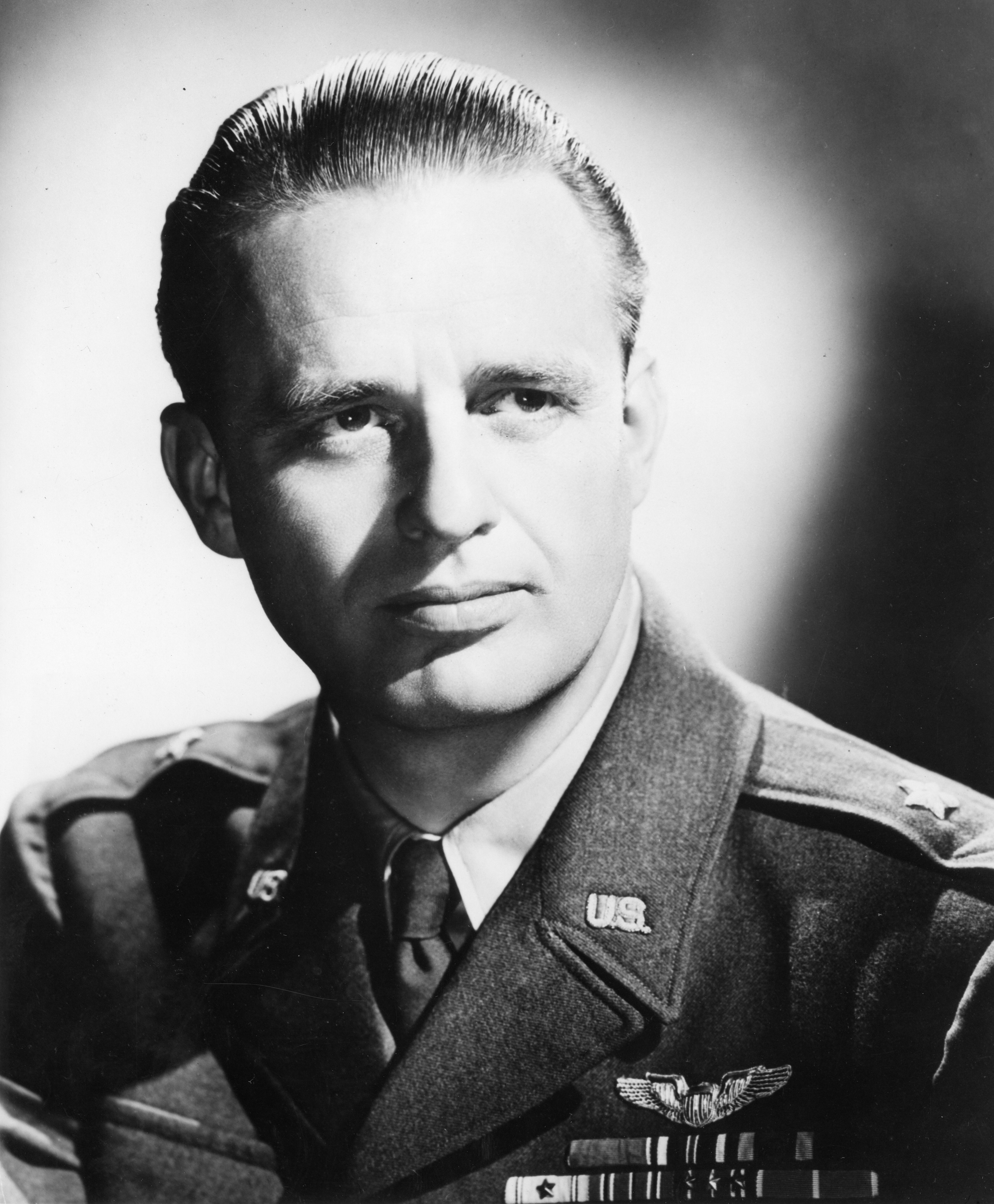
- Roosevelt in 1945

24th Mayor of Miami Beach
- In office June 1, 1965 – June 6, 1967
- Preceded by: Melvin Richard
- Succeeded by: Jay Dermer

Personal details
- Born: September 23, 1910 New York City, New York, U.S.
- Died: October 27, 1990 (aged 80) Scottsdale, Arizona, U.S.
- Party: Democratic
- Other political affiliations: Progressive Citizens of America (1947)
- Spouses: Elizabeth Browning Donner (m. 1932; div. 1933) Ruth Josephine Googins (m. 1933; div. 1944) Faye Emerson (m. 1944; div. 1950) Minnewa Bell (m. 1951; div. 1960) Patricia Peabody Whitehead (m. 1960)
- Children: 5
- Parent(s): Franklin Delano Roosevelt; Anna Eleanor Roosevelt
- Relatives: Roosevelt family
- Education: Hun School of Princeton; Groton School

Military service
- Allegiance: United States
- Branch/service: United States Army Air Forces
- Years of service: 1940–1945
- Rank: Brigadier General
- Commands: 3rd Reconnaissance Group; Northwest African Photographic Reconnaissance Wing; 90th Photographic Wing; 325th Photographic Wing
- Battles/wars: World War II; Operation Rusty; Operation Torch; Operation Crosspoint; Operation Frantic; Operation Neptune
- Awards: Legion of Merit; Distinguished Flying Cross; Air Medal (12)

Elliott Roosevelt (September 23, 1910 – October 27, 1990) was an American aviation official and wartime officer in the United States Army Air Forces, reaching the rank of brigadier general. He was a son of President Franklin D. Roosevelt and First Lady Eleanor Roosevelt.

As a reconnaissance commander, Roosevelt pioneered new techniques in night photography and meteorological data-gathering, but his claims to a distinguished record on combat missions have been largely discounted. After the war ended, he faced an investigation by the United States Congress on charges of corruption, including accusations that he had recommended the purchase of the Hughes F-11 (Note: Under the 1924 United States Army Air Service aircraft designation system, prototypes of an anticipated production aircraft were assigned an "X" prefix; however, the F-11 production contract was canceled, and only the two XF-11 prototypes were built.) reconnaissance aircraft ahead of a Lockheed model that was believed to be superior. Ultimately, he was found blameless.

Roosevelt published a book about his attendance at several major Allied war conferences and a controversial exposé of his parents' private life. He also wrote 22 mystery novels. Besides writing, his career embraced broadcasting, ranching, politics and business. He served as the 24th mayor of Miami Beach, Florida, from 1965 to 1967.

== Early life ==
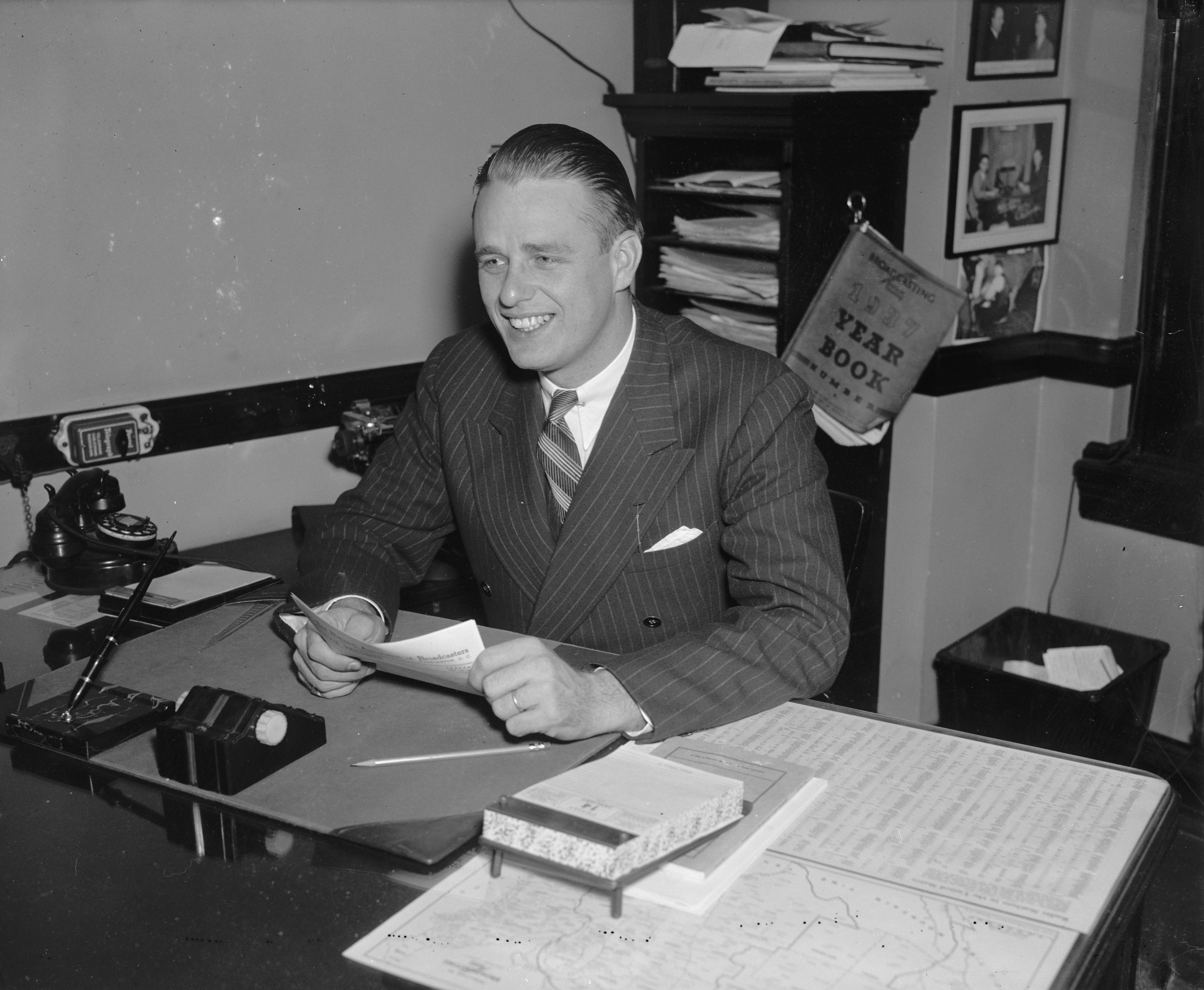
Roosevelt as broadcasting manager, 1938

Elliott Roosevelt was a son of President Franklin D. Roosevelt (1882–1945) and First Lady Eleanor Roosevelt (1884–1962). He was named after his maternal grandfather, Elliott Roosevelt (1860–1894). His siblings were Anna (1906–1975), James (1907–1991), Franklin Jr. (1914–1988), and John (1916–1981).

An older brother, Franklin, died in 1909 as an infant.

Roosevelt attended the Hun School of Princeton and went to Groton School, as did his brothers. He refused to attend Harvard College. Instead, he worked a series of briefly held jobs, beginning with advertising and settling in broadcasting in the 1930s, including a management position in the Hearst radio chain.

== Military service ==
Roosevelt had always been interested in flight, and in 1933 he briefly served as general manager of Gilpin Airlines of Glendale, California, a small airline owned by Rep. Isabella Greenway (D-AZ), a close friend of the family. Later that year he became aviation editor for the William Randolph Hearst newspapers. After controversial involvement in the Air Mail Scandal and a secret attempt to sell bombers in civilian disguise to the USSR, he was hired as vice president of the Aeronautical Chamber of Commerce (see Aerospace Industries Association), a post he held until 1935. That year, he moved to Fort Worth, Texas and became involved in broadcasting and farming.

Roosevelt received a captain's commission in the United States Army Air Corps on 23 September 1940, his 30th birthday. His appointment in the middle of the 1940 election campaign caused a furious political row, although General Henry H. Arnold, the Chief of the Air Corps, asserted that there was no pressure or nepotism involved. After brief service at Wright Field, Ohio, he took an intelligence course and served with the 21st Reconnaissance Squadron at the new U.S. facility in Gander, Newfoundland.

In the summer of 1941, Roosevelt searched for and located air base sites in Labrador, Baffin Island, and Greenland and reported on conditions in Iceland and along the rest of the embryonic North Atlantic ferry route. During this time, he coordinated closely with FDR, Prime Minister Winston Churchill, and General Arnold. Elliott Roosevelt was the first to interest Churchill in American bases in Africa (including Bathurst in the Gambia), a step for which his father was not yet ready. He served as a procurement specialist, navigator, and intelligence and reconnaissance officer and rose to brigadier general by January 1945. Despite having poor eyesight and being classified 4-F (unfit), he also became a pilot and reportedly flew 89 combat missions by the time of his inactivation from the United States Army Air Forces (USAAF) in August 1945.

While Roosevelt operated from Gander in August 1941, FDR detached him and his brother Franklin Jr. to attend the Atlantic Conference (Atlantic Charter) in Argentia between Churchill and FDR, which was nearby. In January 1943, Roosevelt accompanied FDR as a military attaché to the Casablanca meeting and the subsequent Cairo and Tehran Conferences in November–December 1943. At a dinner during the Tehran Conference, Joseph Stalin proposed to round up and shoot some 50,000 German officers and technicians after the war in order to permanently incapacitate Germany. Roosevelt spoke in favor of the proposal which earned him Stalin's cheers and the vocal and lasting hostility of Churchill who said "I would rather be taken out into the garden here and now and be shot myself".

Following a navigator/bombardier course in the fall of 1941 and a brief stint on antisubmarine patrol duty with the 6th Reconnaissance Squadron at Muroc AAB, Roosevelt received a top-secret assignment to carry out clandestine reconnaissance flights over the Sahara Desert, with emphasis on French West Africa, with which the United States was not at war. Having been successful with this (Project Rusty), he was given command of the new 3d Reconnaissance Group at Colorado Springs. From Gibraltar and then Oran, Algeria, he led this unit in Operation Torch, the invasion of Northwest Africa in early November 1942. Roosevelt (with a pilot) flew the first U.S. reconnaissance missions over the theater in a borrowed RAF de Havilland Mosquito. This led to a long campaign for the U.S. adoption of this British aircraft, as Roosevelt held the American counterparts (modified Boeing B-17Cs and early Lockheed P-38s) to be inadequate and unlikely to survive in contested airspace.

From Maison Blanche, Algeria, and after the fall of Tunis, La Marsa near ancient Carthage, Roosevelt pioneered new tactics, including night aerial photography and obtained before and after imagery of Rome during that city's first heavy bombing on 19 July 1943.

After his detachment to investigate reconnaissance issues in the United States (see the Hughes scandal section below), Roosevelt received command of the 8th Air Force's reconnaissance wing in England: the 8th Provisional RW, later renamed the 325th Reconnaissance Wing. During this period, Roosevelt worked on the shuttle-bombing project with the USSR, and participated in the May 1944 mission to the USSR which inspected the new American bases at Poltava, Mirgorod, and Piryatin. His units also supported the D-Day invasion of Normandy and the bombing campaign against V-weapon sites.

Following threats of resignation and pressure from "very high topside," in January 1945 General Arnold ordered General Carl Spaatz in England to appoint Roosevelt a rated pilot, and the president submitted his son's name to the Senate for promotion to brigadier general. By standard rules, Roosevelt was eligible for the rank, but not for the pilot's wings. Roosevelt continued in that rank in Europe until his father's death on April 12, 1945. After VE-Day, the Air Forces could no longer find a "suitable vacancy" for him, and he was on leave and had staff duties in the United States. By coincidence, his last day of service was VJ-Day.

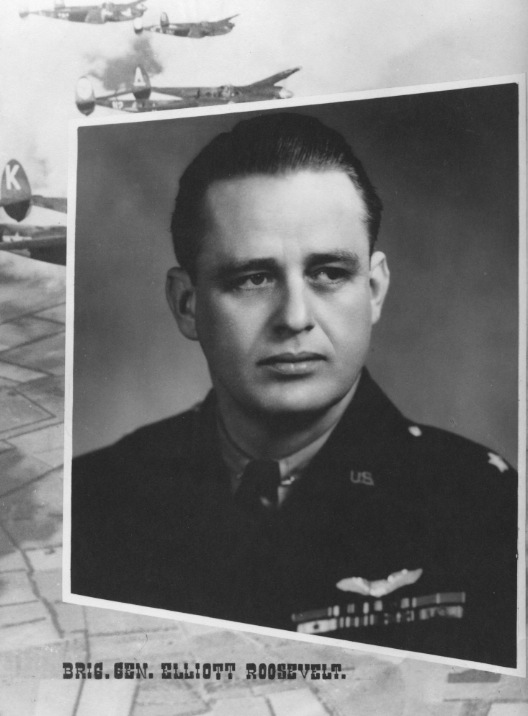
Brigadier General Elliott Roosevelt as commander of the 325th Photographic Wing, 1945

Roosevelt commanded the following units:

- 3d Reconnaissance Group, 11 July – 13 August 1942 at the rank of major; 30 September 1942 – 1 March 1943 ending at the rank of colonel
  Assigned to Twelfth Air Force and flew aboard numerous aircraft types during reconnaissance missions for the North Africa campaign in Algeria and Tunisia
- Northwest African Photographic Reconnaissance Wing, February 1943 – November 1943, as lieutenant colonel and colonel. This was a composite unit with U.S., British, South African, and French squadrons.
- 90th Photographic Wing, 22 November 1943 – 25 January 1944 at the rank of colonel.
  Assigned to Twelfth Air Force, command and control organization that provided photographic reconnaissance to both the Twelfth and Fifteenth Air Forces. Operationally controlled both 3d and 5th Reconnaissance Groups in Tunisia. The 90th's subordinate units reconnoitered airdromes, roads, marshaling yards, and harbors in Italy after the Allied landings at Salerno.
- 325th Photographic Wing, 9 August 1944 – 17 January 1945 at the rank of colonel; 22 January – 13 April 1945 ending at the rank of brigadier general.
  Assigned to Eighth Air Force, command and control organization that through subordinate units, flew reconnaissance over the waters adjacent to the British Isles and the European continent to obtain meteorological data. Wing aircraft collected weather information needed in planning operations; flew night photographic missions to detect enemy activity; and provided daylight photographic and mapping missions. The wing also flew photographic missions over the Netherlands in support of Operation Market Garden in September 1944 and operated closely with tactical units in the Battle of the Bulge (December 1944 – February 1945).

Roosevelt stated that he flew 89 combat missions and 470 combat hours prior to being called back for his father's funeral in April 1945 (he did not return to active theaters). His decorations included the Distinguished Flying Cross. He also received the Order of the British Empire, the Croix de Guerre and Legion d'Honneur, the Moroccan Order of Ouissam Alaouite, and the U.S. Legion of Merit. He ended the war holding the Air Medal with reportedly eleven clusters. As a chase pilot for the Operation Aphrodite flights in 1944, Roosevelt said he witnessed the death of Joseph P. Kennedy Jr. over Blythburgh, England (there is no evidence in Aphrodite files that Roosevelt participated in this project, nor did he fly as chase pilot and witness the death of Joseph P. Kennedy).

After the war, Roosevelt no longer played a significant role in aviation, although he maintained a private pilot's license and owned a small aircraft. He briefly served as the president of short-lived Empire Airlines of New York (1946), citing his influence with the Civil Aeronautics Board (CAB), which, however, did not result in route awards. Reported attempts to assist Howard Hughes's TWA in obtaining air routes to the USSR also did not succeed.

=== Warplanes purchasing scandal ===
In August 1943, Colonel Roosevelt was asked by the Chief of the Army Air Forces, General Henry H. Arnold, to investigate several reconnaissance aircraft under development to select a successor to the Lockheed P-38 Lightning (F-4 and F-5 in the recon version), but the reason for Arnold's choice of Roosevelt was not made public. Roosevelt assembled a group of five air officers, including veteran RAF reconnaissance pilot Wing Commander D.W. Steventon. Upon their arrival in Los Angeles, Roosevelt and his group were met by eight limousines arranged by John W. Meyer, a publicist and former nightclub owner who was employed by Hughes Aircraft Company. On his first day in town, Roosevelt was taken by Meyer to the Hollywood film studio of Warner Bros. and introduced to Faye Emerson, an actress with whom Roosevelt was linked romantically (the two would eventually marry). Over the next three days, Roosevelt and his group were seen with Meyer in Hollywood nightclubs and at parties in luxurious mansions in the company of aspiring actresses paid $100–400 per night by Meyer (equivalent to $1861–$7442 in 2025).

On August 11, Howard Hughes showed the group his Culver City aircraft factory, then personally flew them to see the private-venture Hughes D-2, an experimental twin-engine wooden aircraft then being test-flown at a Hughes facility at Harper Dry Lake in the Mojave Desert. The aircraft had already been turned down ten months earlier by Chief of Army Air Forces Material Division Oliver P. Echols, for being inadequate for military service; it was considered unlikely to become successful for numerous reasons, wooden construction and Hughes's limited facilities among them. (Note: The original reason for the D-2's design and construction is unclear. It was not designed to military specifications, and Howard Hughes did not offer it to the US military until it was mostly completed. The USAAF struggled to define a mission for it, settling on reconnaissance after it became clear that it lacked the maneuverability of a fighter aircraft and the payload of a bomber. Historian René Francillon speculates that Howard Hughes intended it for a personal global circumnavigation speed record attempt, but offered it to the military in an attempt to recover his investment after the outbreak of World War II closed much of the world's airspace and made it difficult for civilians to purchase aircraft parts.) Roosevelt and his committee, however, fervently recommended the D-2. When Roosevelt returned to the East Coast of the United States, Meyer hosted another round of parties and nightclub outings in Manhattan and arranged for Faye Emerson to accompany Roosevelt. Among many favors, Meyer gave Emerson $132 (equivalent to $2,456 in 2025) worth of nylon stockings, a rare treat during wartime rationing.

On August 20, Roosevelt sent a report to General Arnold recommending immediate purchase of the D-2. On September 1, Arnold ordered Echols to contract with Hughes for an all-metal reconnaissance aircraft "against my better judgment and the advice of my staff." During these two weeks, Arnold, Elliott Roosevelt, and FDR conferred frequently at the White House, and it is documented that Elliott Roosevelt complained to his father about Arnold's reluctance to order the aircraft.

Major General Charles E. Bradshaw wrote to Arnold to suggest that the Lockheed Lockheed XP-58 Chain Lightning was much farther along in development and could outperform the D-2 in every important aspect, but was unsuccessful in halting the Hughes contract. Implicating Roosevelt and United States Secretary of Commerce Jesse H. Jones, Assistant Secretary of War Robert A. Lovett noted to Major General Bennett E. Meyers that "Hughes has got powerful friends here in Washington" and that, if the background of the contract were uncovered, "there's going to be an awful smell." Nonetheless, Hughes was given $43 million (equivalent to $800.05 million in 2025) to build 100 all-metal aircraft to be designated the Hughes F-11. The program was substantially delayed by logistical and managerial problems along with disputes instigated by Howard Hughes over sunk costs from the D-2 and the extensive design changes demanded by the USAAF, notably the elimination of wood; the war ended before an XF-11 prototype was completed, the production contract was canceled, and Hughes was nearly killed in the crash of the first prototype during its maiden flight on 5 April 1946. A second XF-11 prototype was only flight-tested for a short time before being converted into a stationary maintenance trainer and scrapped.

In 1947, Roosevelt telephoned Hughes to warn him that a United States Senate subcommittee (the "Brewster Committee", formerly the "Truman Committee") intended to call them both to account for financial irregularities regarding the XF-11 as well as for Hughes' H-4 Hercules, popularly known as the "Spruce Goose". As part of the ongoing "Investigation of the National Defense Program", on August 4, 1947, the subcommittee called Roosevelt and Meyer to testify about the Hollywood and Manhattan parties and women that Meyer had arranged and paid for. Meyer's extensive financial records during such parties showed him paying $200 for "presents for four girls" and $50 for "girls at the hotel (late)". At one point, Roosevelt asked Meyer: "Any of those girls who were paid, were they procured for my entertainment?" Meyer responded: "I don't like the word 'procured,' because a girl who attends a party and is given a present is not necessarily 'procured'." The committee found that Meyer had spent at least $1,000 in picking up Roosevelt's hotel bills as well as his nightclub and party checks, and Faye Emerson's bets at Agua Caliente Racetrack, and that Meyer had arranged for weekends in Palm Springs, California and Washington, D.C. for Roosevelt and Emerson, who eventually married in December 1944 after Roosevelt divorced his second wife in March 1944. The wedding at the Grand Canyon was also paid for by Meyer.

All told, Meyer reported to the committee that he had spent $5,083.79 ($92,979 in 2025 dollars) on entertainment for Roosevelt. In his own defense, Roosevelt testified that he never heard of the XF-11 until General Arnold let him know about it, and that several of the parties appeared to have taken place on days when he was out of the country on active duty. Roosevelt said: "If it is true that for the price of entertainment I made recommendations which would have in any way endangered the lives of the men under me...that fact should be made known to the public."

== Political career ==
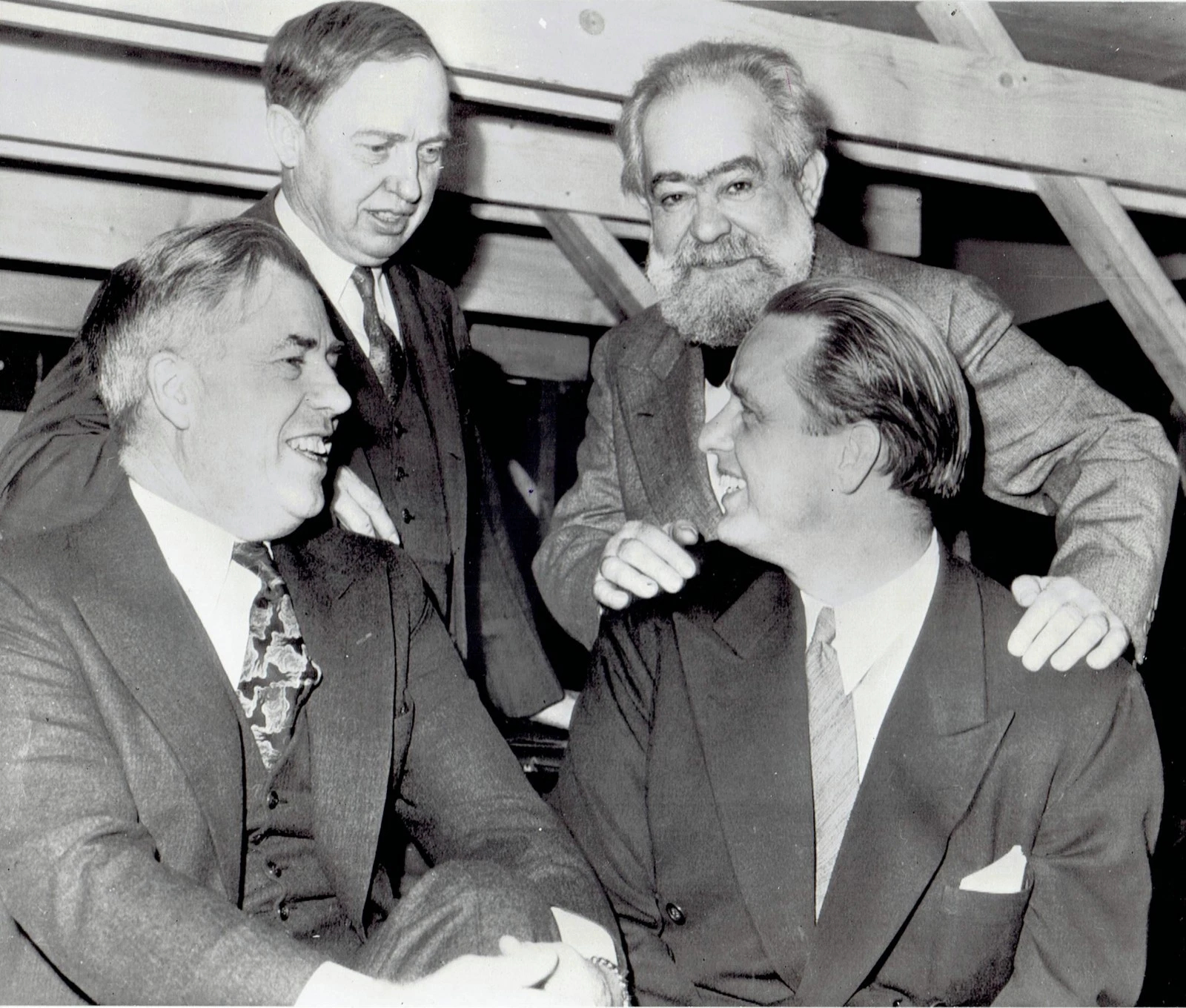
Progressive Citizens of America members, 1947. (Seated, L-R): Henry A. Wallace and Elliott Roosevelt (Standing, L-R): Dr. Harlow Shapley and Jo Davidson.

Roosevelt was active in the Democratic Party as early as 1932, when he attended the Democratic National Convention that nominated his father for president. He was later elected a delegate to the 1936 and 1940 DNCs representing Texas, and at the latter convention attempted to secure the nomination of fellow Texan Jesse H. Jones for vice president.

After his father's death, Roosevelt began to drift away from the Democratic Party. In 1946, he endorsed American Laborite Eugene P. Connolly over Democrat Daniel Flynn for Congress in New York's 21st district. In 1947, he gave a speech at a sold-out "Crisis Meeting" hosted by the Progressive Citizens of America at Madison Square Garden in which he attacked the Truman Doctrine for threatening world peace. He further criticized Truman's domestic policies as leading the nation toward another depression, and encouraged PCA members to storm the 1948 DNC and nominate former Vice President Henry A. Wallace for president.

In March 1948 however, Roosevelt abruptly changed course and joined the Draft Eisenhower movement alongside his brother Franklin, denouncing Wallace's proposed third party. Journalist Curtis D. MacDougall posits this sudden shift in opinion was likely the result of "economic pressure" from his mother.

== Later life ==
After FDR's death in 1945, Roosevelt and his family moved to Top Cottage to be near his mother, who considered him her favorite child. She gave him financial assistance throughout her life. In 1947, Eleanor bought from the FDR estate Val-Kill farms, the home she lived in after FDR's death, and deeded the property to Elliott Roosevelt. After he moved to Miami Beach and Havana with his fourth wife in 1952, his brother John bought the Hyde Park tract. Later, the property became the Eleanor Roosevelt National Historic Site.

Roosevelt pursued many different careers during his life, including owning a pre-war radio station network (Texas State Network) in Texas and living as a rancher. He again moved to Florida and was elected mayor of Miami Beach in 1965, then was unseated two years later. After a business career marked by ties to the national crime syndicate, he was investigated by the U.S. Senate Permanent Subcommittee on Investigations (PSI) under Senator Henry M. Jackson in 1973.

During the PSI hearings on corruption, Roosevelt was accused of involvement in a 1968 plot to assassinate Bahamian prime minister Lynden Pindling as revenge for Pindling's refusal to grant a gambling license to a criminal associate of Roosevelt and mob boss Meyer Lansky. Roosevelt and "alleged mobster front man" Michael McLaney (another known associate of Lansky) offered Florida Mafia figure and purported hitman Louis Mastriana the sum of US$100,000 (equivalent to $926,000 in 2025) to assassinate Pindling.

Roosevelt gave Mastriana a signed check for US$10,000 (equivalent to $93,000 in 2025) as a down payment on the hit. Mastriana taped all of his conversation with Roosevelt, allegedly using equipment from the U.S. Postal Service. Roosevelt maintained that he was innocent and that Mastriana was lying.

Roosevelt emigrated to Portugal in 1972, but left for England after the Portuguese Carnation Revolution in 1974. He moved back to the United States, living in Bellevue, Washington; Indian Wells, California; and Scottsdale, Arizona. As Roosevelt approached his eightieth year, his final ambition was to "outlive James." However, Roosevelt died at age 80 of heart and liver failure. Brother James died 10 months later in August 1991.

== Author and biographer ==
Elliott authored numerous books, including a mystery series in which his mother, Eleanor Roosevelt, is the detective, as Murder and the First Lady (1984). Roosevelt described his experiences with his father during five important war conferences in his best-selling book As He Saw It. He also edited FDR: His Personal Letters, published after the war in four volumes. With James Brough, Roosevelt wrote a highly personal book about his parents called The Roosevelts of Hyde Park: An Untold Story, in which he revealed details about the sexual lives of his parents, including his father's relationships with mistress Lucy Mercer and secretary Marguerite ("Missy") LeHand as well as graphic details surrounding the 1921 paralytic illness that crippled his father. Published in 1973, the biography also contains valuable insights into FDR's run for vice-president, his rise to the governorship of New York, and his capture of the presidency in 1932, particularly with the help of Louis McHenry Howe. A sequel to An Untold Story with James Brough, published in 1975 and titled A Rendezvous With Destiny, carried the Roosevelt saga to the end of World War II. Mother R.: Eleanor Roosevelt's Untold Story, also with Brough, was published in 1977; The Conservators, a political book, in 1982. Eleanor Roosevelt, with Love: A Centenary Remembrance, came out in 1984.

== Marriages and children ==
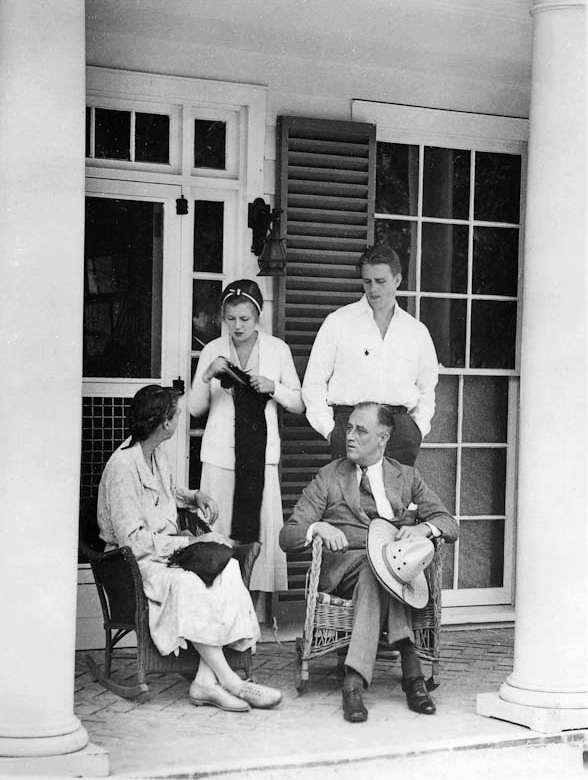
Elizabeth and Elliott Roosevelt (standing) with Eleanor and Franklin Roosevelt at the Little White House in Warm Springs, Georgia

Roosevelt was married five times:

- On January 16, 1932, he married Elizabeth Browning Donner (1911–1980), daughter of William Henry Donner. They had one son, William Donner Roosevelt (1932–2003), an investment banker and philanthropist. On July 17, 1933, Donner filed a cross petition charging Roosevelt with "extreme cruelty" to a court at Minden, Nevada, and they were divorced.
- On July 22, 1933, in Burlington, Iowa, he married Ruth Josephine Googins (1908–1974). They had three children: Ruth Chandler Roosevelt (1934–2018), Elliott Roosevelt Jr. (b. 1936), a Texas oilman, and David Boynton Roosevelt (1942–2022). Roosevelt and Googins were divorced in March 1944. She married Harry T. Eidson on June 23, 1944.
- On December 3, 1944, at the Grand Canyon in Arizona, he married actress Faye Emerson. They were divorced on January 17, 1950. She died of stomach cancer in 1983 in Spain.
- On March 15, 1951, in Miami Beach, Florida, he married Minnewa Bell (Gray Burnside Ross). They were divorced in 1960. Minnewa died in 1983.
- On November 3, 1960, in Qualicum Beach, British Columbia, he married Patricia Peabody Whitehead. Her four children, James M. Whitehead, Ford Whitehead, Gretchen Whitehead, and David Macauley Whitehead, were all adopted by Roosevelt. The couple's only child together, Livingston Delano Roosevelt, died in 1962 as an infant.

== Military awards ==
Roosevelt's military decorations and awards include:

| Legion of Merit | | Distinguished Flying Cross | |
| Air Medal with eleven clusters | American Defense Service Medal | American Campaign Medal | European-African-Middle Eastern; Campaign Medal with seven stars |
| World War II Victory Medal | Commander of the Order of the British Empire (United Kingdom) | Knight of the Legion of Honour (France) | Croix de Guerre with palm (France) |
