= 5th Reconnaissance Squadron (disambiguation) =

The 5th Reconnaissance Squadron is an active United States Air Force unit, originally organized as the 5th Aero Squadron in 1917. It has held this designation since October 1994.

5th Reconnaissance Squadron may also refer to:

- The 395th Strategic Missile Squadron, designated the 5th Reconnaissance Squadron (Medium) from April 1941 to April 1942
- The 50th Education Squadron, designated the 5th Reconnaissance Squadron, Very Long Range (Photographic) from April 1946 to October 1947

== See also ==
- 5th Strategic Reconnaissance Squadron
- 5th Strategic Reconnaissance Training Squadron
- 5th Photographic Reconnaissance Squadron
