= General Roosevelt =

General Roosevelt may refer to:

- Elliott Roosevelt (1910–1990), U.S. Army Air Force brigadier general
- James Roosevelt (1907–1991), U.S. Marine Corps Reserve brigadier general
- Theodore Roosevelt Jr. (1887–1944), U.S. Army brigadier general
