= SANACC =

SANACC may refer to:

- SANACC, Scottish Anglers National Association Competition Clubs Ltd is the Association of Scottish Angling Clubs which organizes national fly fishing competitions.
- SANACC, US State, Army, Navy, Air Force Coordinating Committee which approved Operation Bloodstone on June 10, 1948.
