= 5th Reconnaissance Group =

5th Reconnaissance Group may refer to:

- The 26th Tactical Reconnaissance Wing, which was designated the 5th Reconnaissance Group in 1945
- The 5th Operations Group, which was designated the 5th Reconnaissance Group, Very Long Range, Photographic from 1947 to 1949
