= 5th Photographic Reconnaissance Squadron =

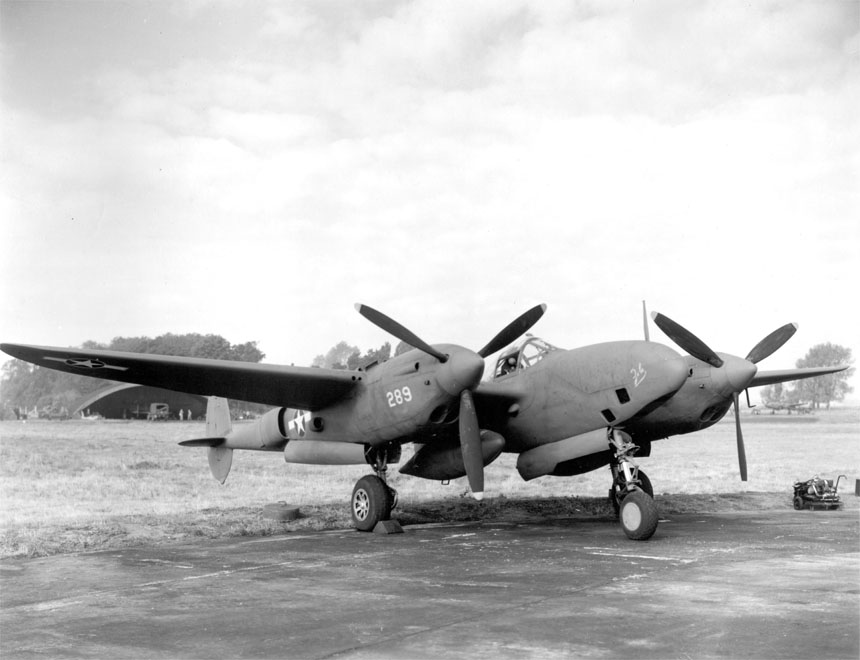
- F-5A Lightning as flown by the squadron
- Active: 1942–1945
- Country: United States
- Branch: United States Air Force
- Type: Reconnaissance and Mapping
- Engagements: Mediterranean Theater of Operations
- Decorations: Distinguished Unit Citation

Insignia
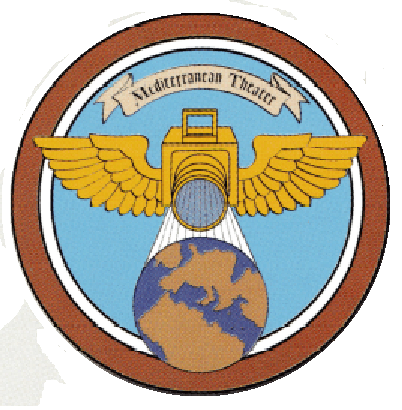
- 5th Photographic Reconnaissance Squadron emblem (Note: Unofficial, used in the Mediterranean Theater of Operations.)

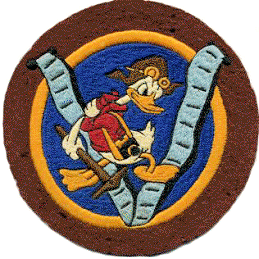
- 5th Photographic Reconnaissance Squadron emblem (Note: Unofficial, used in the United States.)

The 5th Photographic Reconnaissance Squadron is an inactive United States Air Force unit. It was last assigned to the 3d Reconnaissance Group. It was inactivated at Pomigliano Airfield, Italy on 12 September 1945.

== History ==
Established in early 1942; trained under First Air Force as an observation squadron. Equipped with O-59 Grasshoppers and flew observation fights largely over Fort Campbell, Kentucky while Army units were training in ground maneuvers.

Deployed to European Theater of Operations in March 1942; assigned to Eighth Air Force. Trained with RAF reconnaissance units, flying photographic reconnaissance sweeps over France and the Low Countries, obtaining intelligence information about German defenses along the channel coast. Flew reconnaissance over Dieppe, France prior to August 1942 commando raid using modified Lockheed F-4 Lightning aircraft.

Deployed to Mediterranean Theater of Operations, assigned to Twelfth Air Force in Algeria during November 1942, shortly after the Operation Torch landings in North Africa. Provided tactical aerial reconnaissance over Algeria and Tunisia during North African Campaign; over Sicily and Italy in preparation for ground invasions in mid-1943. Received long-range North American F-10 Mitchell medium bombers equipped for aerial reconnaissance in 1944. Remained assigned to Twelfth Air Force in Italy, providing tactical aerial reconnaissance support of Allied ground forces during the Italian Campaign, 1943–1945 also supported Free French units in the liberation of Corsica, 1944.

Inactivated in Italy after the German Capitulation, summer 1945.

=== Lineage ===
Constituted as the 5th Photographic Squadron on 19 January 1942

- Activated on 1 February 1942

Redesignated: 5th Photographic Reconnaissance Squadron on 9 June 1942
Redesignated: 5th Photographic Squadron (Light) on 6 February 1943
Redesignated: 5th Combat Mapping Squadron on 21 January 1944
Redesignated: 5th Photographic Reconnaissance Squadron on 31 August 1944
Inactivated on 12 September 1945

=== Assignments ===
- Air Force Combat Command, 1 February 1942
- Army Air Forces, 9 March 1942
- 73d Observation Group, 12 March 1942
- Eighth Air Force, 10 May 1942
- VIII Bomber Command, 7 September 1942
- Twelfth Air Force, 19 September 1942 (Attached to 3d Reconnaissance Group (later 3rd Photographic Reconnaissance and Mapping Group, 3rd Photographic Group) from Oct 1942
- 3d Photographic Group (later 3rd Reconnaissance Group), 21 Jan 1944 – 12 Sep 1945 (flight attached to 5th Photographic Group, 10 March – 9 May 1944)

=== Stations ===
- Langley Field, Virginia, 1 February 1942
- Godman Field, Kentucky, 7 February 1942
- Felts Field, Washington, c. 15 April – 21 May 1942
- RAF Molesworth (AAF-107), England, 17 June 1942
- RAF Podington (AAF-109), England, 10 September – 29 October 1942
- Es Sénia Airport, Algeria, 12 November 1942
- Tafaraoui Airport, Algeria, 17 Nov 1942;
- Maison Blanche Airport, Algeria, 27 Nov 1942
- La Marsa Airport, Tunisia, 13 Jun 1943 (Operated primarily from: Pontecagnano Airport, Italy, 4–14 Oct 1943, Pomigliano Airfield, Italy, after 14 Oct 1943
- Pomigliano d'Arco Airfield, Italy, 27 Nov 1943 (flight operated from San Severo Airfield, Italy, 10 Mar – 5 May 1944)
- Nettuno Airfield, Italy, 12 Jun 1944
- Viterbo Airfield, Italy, 24 Jun 1944
- Borgo Airfield, Corsica, 11 Jul 1944
- Malignano Airfield, Italy, 24 Sep 1944;
- Florence/Peretola Airport, Italy, 17 Jan 1945 (flight operated from Pisa Airfield, Italy, 29 Jan–May 1945)
- Pomigliano d'Arco Airfield, Italy, Aug-12 Sep 1945

=== Aircraft ===
- O-59 Grasshopper, 1942
- Lockheed F-4 Lightning, 1942–1943
- Lockheed F-5 Lightning, 1943–1945
- Spitfire PR Mk XIII (attached) 1943–1944
- Spitfire PR Mk IX, 1944–1945
- North American F-10 Mitchell, 1944–1945
