= Rosia Airfield =

Airfield in Italy

Rosia Airfield
- Part of Twelfth Air Force

Site information
- Type: Military airfield
- Controlled by: United States Army Air Forces

Location
- Coordinates: 43°14′37.19″N 011°13′37.72″E (Approximate)

Site history
- Built: 1944
- In use: 1944

Location of Rosia Airfield, Italy

Rosia Airfield is an abandoned World War II military airfield in Italy, which is located approximately 13 km southwest of Siena; 180 km northwest of Rome.

It was an all-weather temporary field built by the XII Engineer Command using a graded earth compacted surface, with a prefabricated hessian (burlap) surfacing known as PHS. PHS was made of an asphalt-impregnated jute which was rolled out over the compacted surface over a square mesh track (SMT) grid of wire joined in 3-inch squares. Pierced Steel Planking was also used for parking areas, as well as for dispersal sites, when it was available. In addition, tents were used for billeting and also for support facilities; an access road was built to the existing road infrastructure; a dump for supplies, ammunition, and gasoline drums, along with a drinkable water and minimal electrical grid for communications and station lighting.

Once completed it was turned over for use by the United States Army Air Force Twelfth Air Force 3d Reconnaissance Group, which flew F-4 and F-5 Lightnings from the airfield between September 1944 and January 1945.

Today, the airfield runway and dispersal pads are faintly visible on aerial photography of the Nettuno area.
