= 23rd Intelligence Squadron =

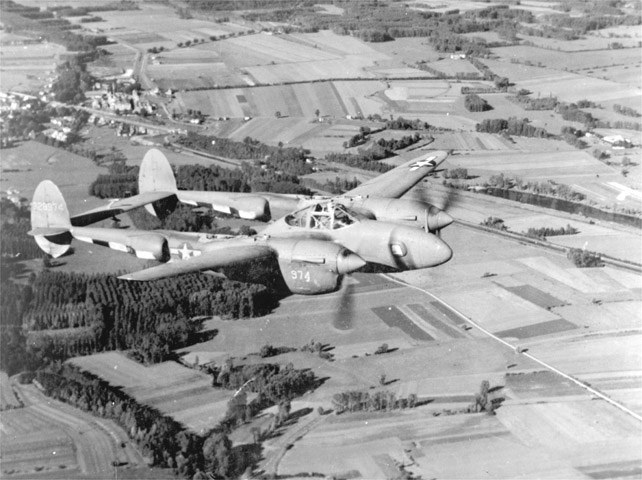
- F-5E Lightning of World War II
- Active: 1942–1945; 1986–1996; 2000–2011; 2017–present
- Country: United States
- Branch: United States Air Force
- Role: Military intelligence
- Part of: Air Force Reserve Command
- Garrison/HQ: Joint Base San Antonio-Lackland
- Nickname: "Fightin' Knights"
- Mottos: Lights On, Fights On; Per Lucem Vincimus (Latin for 'We Conquer Through Light') (World War II)
- Engagements: Mediterranean Theater of Operations
- Decorations: Distinguished Unit Citation; Air Force Outstanding Unit Award; French Croix de Guerre with silver gilt star air Force Organizational Excellence Award; Air Force Outstanding Unit Award

Insignia
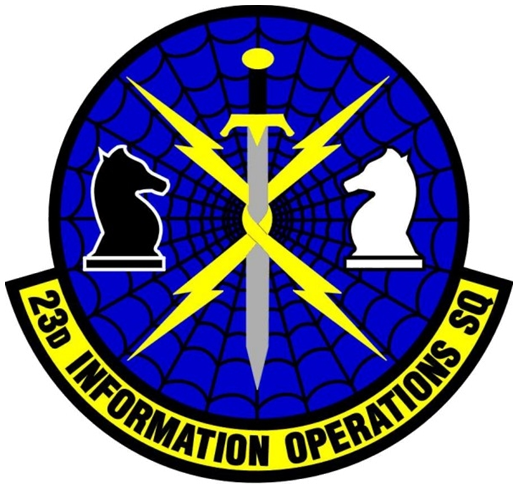
- 23d Intelligence Squadron emblem (Note: Approved 15 November 2000.)

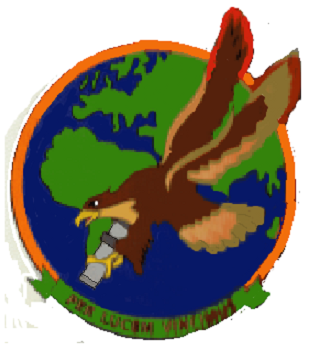
- 23rd Photographic Reconnaissance Squadron emblem

The United States Air Force's 23d Intelligence Squadron is a military intelligence unit located at Joint Base San Antonio, Texas. Its first predecessor was organized during World War II as the 23rd Photographic Reconnaissance Squadron. After training in the United States, the squadron deployed to the Mediterranean Theater of Operations, until V-E Day, earning a Distinguished Unit Citation and French Croix de Guerre. It inactivated in theater in September 1945.

The squadron's second predecessor is the 6947th Electronic Security Squadron, which was organized at Key West Naval Air Station in 1986. In 1993 the two squadrons were consolidated as the 23d Intelligence Squadron in 1993. The squadron was inactivated in 1996, but activated again as the 23d Information Operations Squadron at Kelly Annex from 2000 to 2011. The squadron returned to the 23d Intelligence Squadron designation and was activated in the reserves in 2017.

== History ==
=== World War II ===
The squadron was first activated as the 23d Photographic Reconnaissance Squadron in 1942. It served in combat in the Mediterranean Theater of Operations, where it earned a Distinguished Unit Citation and a French Croix de Guerre for combat operations.

=== Intelligence operations ===
The 6947th Electronic Security Squadron was activated at Key West Naval Air Station in 1986 as an electronic intelligence squadron. In 1993, the two squadrons were consolidated as the 23rd Intelligence Squadron. The consolidated squadron was inactivated in 1996.

The squadron was again activated as the 23rd Information Operations Squadron in 2000. The mission of the squadron was to deliver full spectrum information operations tactics to the warfighter. The squadron was inactivated in 2011 and its resources and personnel transferred to the 318th Operations Support Squadron.

The squadron was activated in the reserve in 2017 as the 23rd Intelligence Squadron.

== Lineage ==
23d Photographic Reconnaissance Squadron
Constituted as the 23rd Photographic Reconnaissance Squadron on 14 July 1942

- Activated on 2 September 1942

Redesignated 23rd Photographic Squadron (Light) on 6 February 1943
Redesignated 23rd Photographic Reconnaissance Squadron on 13 November 1943
Inactivated on 12 September 1945
Consolidated with the 6947th Electronic Security Squadron on 1 October 1993 as the 23rd Intelligence Squadron

23d Information Operations Squadron

- Designated as the 6947th Electronic Security Squadron and activated on 1 July 1986

Consolidated with the 23rd Photographic Reconnaissance Squadron on 1 October 1993 as the 23rd Intelligence Squadron
Redesignated 23rd Information Operations Squadron on 17 July 2000

- Activated on 1 August 2000

Inactivated on 7 December 2011
Redesignated 23rd Intelligence Squadron on 4 August 2017

- Activated on 2 September 2017

=== Assignments ===
- 5th Photographic Group (later 5th Photographic Reconnaissance and Mapping Group, 5th Photographic Reconnaissance Group, 5th Photographic Group): 2 September 1942 (attached to 3d Photographic Reconnaissance and Mapping Group (later 3d Photographic Group), c. 15 July - 8 September 1943, 9 February - 9 March 1944, after 23 August 1944)
- 3d Photographic Group (later 3d Reconnaissance Group): 15 November 1944 – 12 September 1945
- 6940th Electronic Security Wing: 1 Jul 1986
- Continental Electronic Security Division: 1 Apr 1987
- 694th Electronic Security Wing: 15 Jul 1988
- Continental Electronic Security Division: 1 Jan 1991
- 693d Intelligence Wing: 1 Oct 1991
- 67th Intelligence Group: 1 Oct 1993 – 30 Jun 1996
- 318th Information Operations Group: 1 Aug 2000 – 7 December 2011
- 655th Intelligence, Surveillance, and Reconnaissance Group: 2 September 2017 – present

=== Stations ===
- Army Air Base, Colorado Springs, Colorado, 2 September 1942 – 8 August 1943
- La Marsa Airfield, Tunisia, 8 Sep 1943
- Foggia Airfield Complex, Italy, 30 Nov 1943
- San Severo Airfield, Italy, 10 Dec 1943
- Alghero-Fertilia Airport, Sardinia, 2 Feb 1944
- Borgo Airfield, Corsica, 14 Jul 1944
- Valence Airfield (Y-23), France, 5 Sep 1944
- Malignano Airfield, Italy, 13 Oct 1944
- Florence Peretola Airport, Italy, 16 Jan 1945 – 23 Aug 1945
- Pomigliano Airfield, Italy, 23 Aug 1945 – 12 Sep 1945
- Key West Naval Air Station, Florida, 1 Jul 1986 – 30 Jun 1996
- Kelly Air Force Base (later Kelly Annex, Lackland Air Force Base), Texas, 1 Aug 2000 – 7 December 2011
- Joint Base San Antonio-Lackland, 2 September 2017 – present

=== Decorations ===
- Distinguished Unit Citation 28 February 1944
- Air Force Organizational Excellence Award
- Air Force Outstanding Unit Award with six oak leaf clusters
- French Croix de Guerre with gilt star 15 August 1943 – 15 October 1944

=== Aircraft ===
- F-5 (1943–1945)
- Lockheed P-38 Lightning (1943–1945)

== See also ==
- 24th Air Force
