= 543rd Intelligence, Surveillance and Reconnaissance Group =

- Group emblem
- Active: 1942–1945; 1950–1951; 1997 – present
- Country: United States
- Branch: United States Air Force
- Type: Dependant group
- Role: Intelligence and cryptologic operations
- Part of: 70th Intelligence, Surveillance and Reconnaissance Wing
- Base: Joint Base San Antonio–Lackland, Texas
- Nickname: Warrior scouts
- Motto: Archez bien (French for 'Shoot well') (World War II)
- Decorations: Air Force Outstanding Unit Award; Air Force Outstanding Unit Award with Combat V; Distinguished Unit Citation; Korean Presidential Unit Citation

The 543d Intelligence, Surveillance and Reconnaissance Group is an intelligence unit of the United States Air Force. It is located at Joint Base San Antonio, Texas. It has been located there since 1997, when it was activated as the 543d Intelligence Group. It focuses on cryptography operations and signals intelligence.

The group's earliest predecessor was established in June 1942 as the 3d Photographic Group. After training in the United States, the group deployed to the Mediterranean Theater of Operations, where it performed reconnaissance missions, primarily for Twelfth Air Force, earning a Distinguished Unit Citation for its support of Operation Dragoon. After the surrender of Germany, the group was inactivated in Italy in September 1945.

The second ancestor of the group is the 543d Tactical Support Group, a United States Air Force unit that fought in the Korean War under Fifth Air Force. The 543d was established in September 1950 to control tactical reconnaissance units operating in Korea. In February 1951, the group was inactivated and replaced by the 67th Tactical Reconnaissance Wing and its subordinate units transferred or replaced by units of the 67th Wing.

== Mission ==
The 543rd Intelligence, Surveillance and Reconnaissance Group is a force provider for national cryptologic operations and serves as Sixteenth Air Force's primary service cryptologic component for the Department of Homeland Security. The group provides air signals intelligence analysts for the National Security Agency as well as Air Force national and tactical intelligence integration for Air Forces Southern and Air Forces Northern's air operations centers. The group also supports cryptologic missions within North American Air Defense Command and United States Southern Command.

== History ==
=== World War II ===
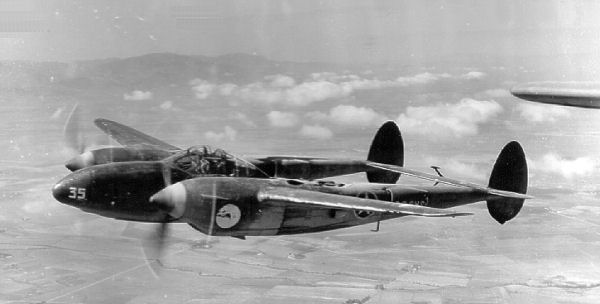
3d Reconnaissance Group F-4

The group was first activated in June 1942 as the 3d Photographic Group and assigned directly to Headquarters, Army Air Forces. The group's initial components were the 12th, 13th, 14th and 15th Photographic Reconnaissance Squadrons. It trained at Peterson Field, Colorado until September 1942, when it moved (less its 14th Squadron and B and C Flights of the 15th) to England, where it flew missions with Eighth Air Force as it prepared for Operation Torch, the invasion of North Africa.

In December 1942, the group moved to North Africa along with its 12th and 15th Squadrons. The 15th's A Flight preceded other group elements, arriving at Tafaroui, Algeria on 18 November, ten days after the initial Torch landings. Although the 13th Photographic Squadron continued to be assigned to the 3d Group until July 1943, the squadron remained in England where it was attached to elements of Eighth Air Force.

The group provided photographic intelligence that assisted the campaign for Tunisia, Operation Corkscrew, the neutralization of Pantelleria, the Sardinia campaign, and Operation Husky, the invasion of Sicily. It reconnoitered airfields, roads, marshalling yards and harbors both before and after Operation Avalanche, the Allied landings at Salerno. It provided coverage for the Battle of Anzio early in 1944 and continued to support the United States Fifth Army in its drive through Italy by determining troop movements, gun positions, and terrain. In Italy, the 23d Photographic Squadron filled out the group again. The squadron was attached to the 3d Group several times in 1943 and 1944, before finally being assigned in November 1944.

Flying from Corsica, the 3d flew reconnaissance missions supporting Operation Dragoon, the invasion of southern France in August 1944. The group received a Distinguished Unit Citation for a mission on 28 August 1944 when it provided photographic intelligence that assisted the rapid advance of Allied ground forces. The group also mapped areas in France and the Balkans. The group was inactivated in Italy in September 1945 and disbanded in 1947.

=== Korean War ===
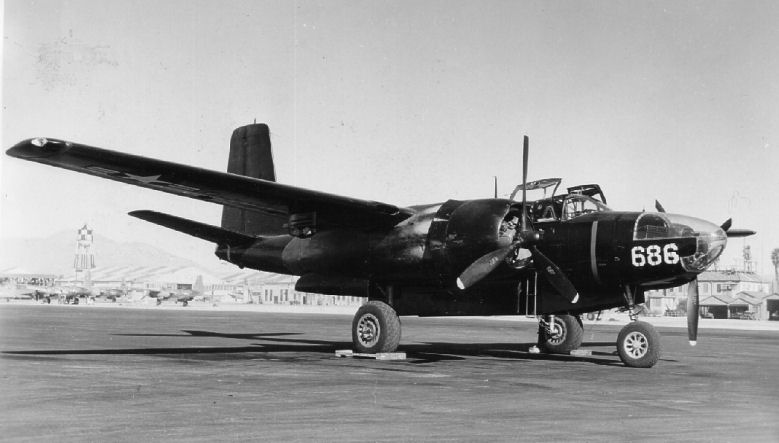
RB-26 Invader at Komaki Air Base during the Korean War (Note: Aircraft is Douglas RB-26 serial 44-35686 of the 12th Tactical Reconnaissance Squadron. The 12th absorbed the aircraft of the 162d Tactical Reconnaissance Squadron in February 1951 when the 67th Tactical Reconnaissance Wing replaced the 543d. Endicott, p. 80.)

When the Korean War broke out in June 1950, Far East Air Forces reconnaissance assets included the 8th Tactical Reconnaissance Squadron, which began flying missions with its Lockheed RF-80 Shooting Stars from Itazuke Air Base. In August, the 162d Tactical Reconnaissance Squadron moved to Itazuke from Langley Air Force Base. Virginia with its Douglas RB-26 Invaders to augment Fifth Air Force night reconnaissance operations in Korea. However, because of the demand for photographic reconnaissance products, the 162d Squadron flew mostly daylight missions.

When the 45th Tactical Reconnaissance Squadron was activated on 26 September, the 543d Tactical Support Group was organized as the headquarters for Fifth Air Force's tactical reconnaissance units operating in Korea. The 45th was activated to fill the gap in visual reconnaissance, which was being performed by a handful of North American T-6 Texans. The 543d and two of its squadrons moved to Korea three days after it was activated. The move was already planned as Fifth Air Force moved units to Korea following the Inchon Landings.

The shortage of photographic interpreters in United States Eighth Army, required the group's 363d Reconnaissance Technical Squadron, which had moved from Langley along with the 162d, to reproduce materials on behalf of the Army. In early November, when reports were received that People's Liberation Army forces were advancing under cover of night, the group's 162d Squadron to begin flying the night missions it had been organized to perform. Until December, the lack of air opposition permitted group aircraft to operate over Korea without fighter cover. However, the increased presence of Chinese MiG-15s resulted in a requirement for high altitude cover, while group reconnaissance aircraft were flying at low level near the Yalu River.

As the Chinese advanced southward through the Korean Peninsula through December 1950, the quality of photographic interpretation provided by the group diminished as other intelligence sources from ground and air dried up, leaving interpreters without context for their work, This lessened the effectiveness of a push during the last ten days of December in which the reconnaissance squadrons mapped the area in front of Eighth Army's lines to a depth of forty miles. In early 1951, as enemy forces continued their southward advance, group headquarters returned to Japan, where its mission, personnel and equipment was absorbed by the 67th Tactical Reconnaissance Wing, which was simultaneously activated at Komaki Air Base. The 45th Tactical Reconnaissance Squadron was transferred to the 67th, while the other squadrons of the 543d Group were replaced by newly activated squadrons of the 67th Wing. In 2005, the 543d was consolidated with the 543d Intelligence Group.

=== Intelligence operations ===
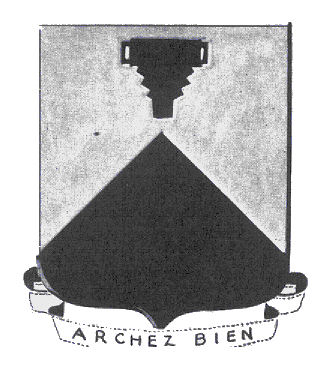
3d Reconnaissance Group Emblem (approved 29 October 1942)

The 3d Reconnaissance Group was reconstituted in July 1985 and redesignated the 543d Tactical Intelligence Group on the inactive list. In 1997, the "Tactical" was dropped from its name and it was activated as an element of the 67th Intelligence Wing at the Medina Annex of Kelly Air Force Base. Three years later, the group transferred to the 70th Intelligence Wing.

== Lineage ==
543d Intelligence, Surveillance and Reconnaissance Group

- Established as the 3rd Photographic Group on 9 June 1942

Activated on 20 June 1942

- Redesignated 3rd Photographic Reconnaissance and Mapping Group on 19 May 1943
- Redesignated 3rd Photographic Group (Reconnaissance) on 13 November 1943
- Redesignated 3rd Reconnaissance Group on 13 May 1945

Inactivated on 12 September 1945

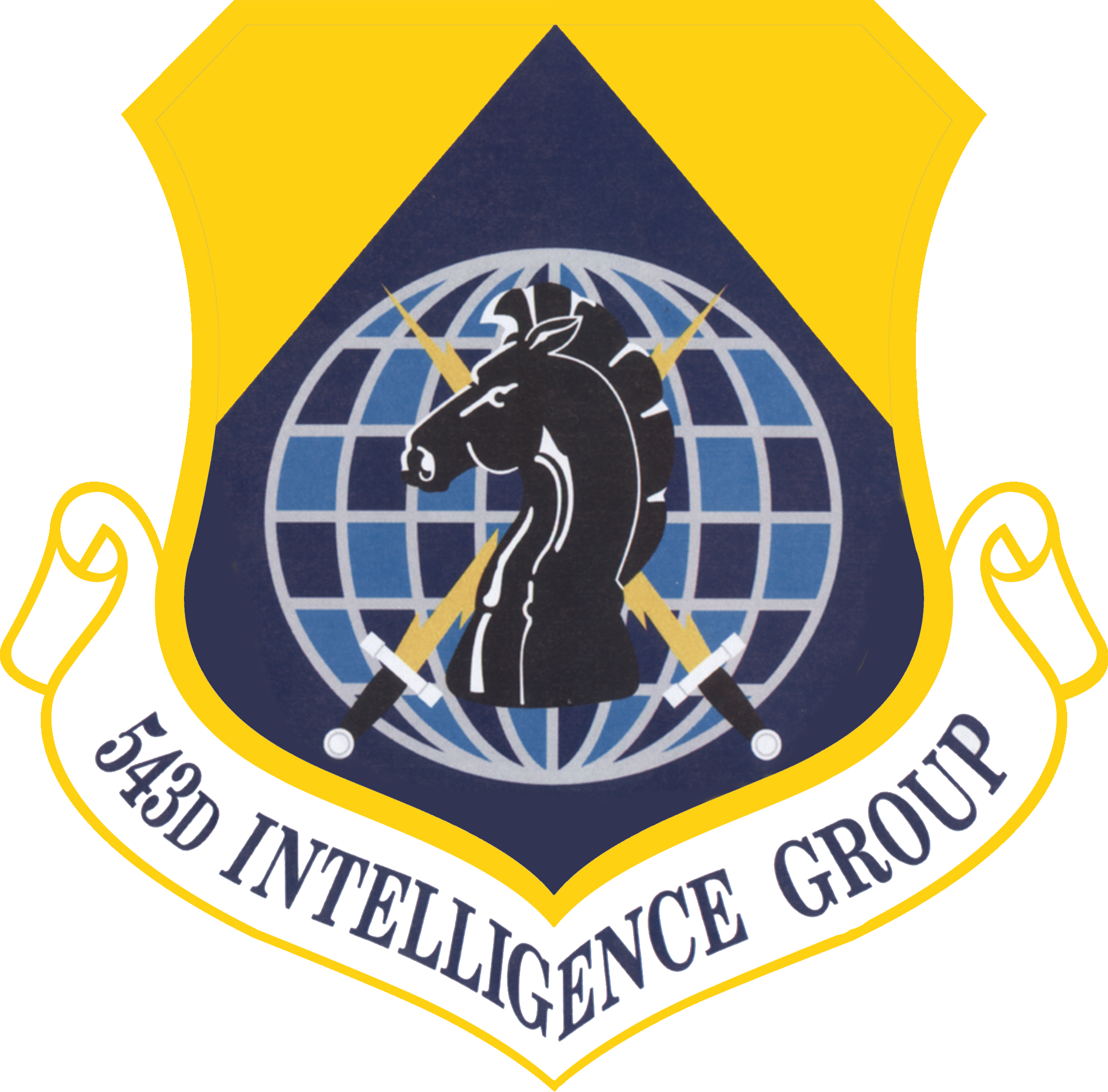
- 543d Intelligence, Surveillance and Reconnaissance Group emblem (approved 5 October 2010)
  Disbanded on 6 March 1947
- Reconstituted and redesignated 543d Tactical Intelligence Group on 31 July 1985
- Redesignated 543d Intelligence Group on 22 January 1997

Activated on 1 March 1997

- Consolidated with the 543d Tactical Support Group on 10 February 2005
- Redesignated 543d Intelligence, Surveillance and Reconnaissance Group on 1 January 2009

543d Tactical Support Group

- Established as the 543d Tactical Support Group on 19 September 1950

Activated on 26 September 1950
Inactivated on 25 February 1951

- Consolidated with the 543d Intelligence Group as the 543d Intelligence Group on 10 February 2005

=== Assignments ===
- Army Air Forces, 20 June 1942
- Eighth Air Force, c. 8 September 1942
- Twelfth Air Force, 16 October 1942 (Note: Futrell indicates the group was assigned to XII Bomber Command until 5 January 1943, then to the Northwest African Photographic Wing. Futrell, p. 22.)
- 90th Photographic Wing, c. 15 August 1943
- Twelfth Air Force, 1 October 1944 – 12 September 1945
- Fifth Air Force, 19 September 1950 – 25 February 1951 (attached to 6149th Tactical Support Wing 1 October 1950, 49th Fighter-Bomber Wing 1 December 1950 – 25 February 1951)
- 67th Intelligence Wing, 1 March 1997
- 70th Intelligence Wing (later 70th Intelligence, Surveillance and Reconnaissance Wing, 16 August 2000 – present

=== Components ===
World War II

- 5th Photographic Reconnaissance Squadron: (attached 1 October 1942 – 21 January 1944), 21 January 1944 – 12 September 1945

Flight further attached to 5th Reconnaissance Group, 10 March – 5 May 1944

- 12th Photographic Reconnaissance Squadron (later 12th Photographic Squadron, 12th Photographic Reconnaissance Squadron): 20 June 1942 – 12 September 1945
- 13th Photographic Reconnaissance Squadron (later 13th Photographic Squadron): 20 June 1942 – 7 July 1943 (attached to 1st Bombardment Wing, 2 December 1942 – 16 February 1943, Eighth Air Force until 7 July 1943)
- 14th Photographic Reconnaissance Squadron: 20 June 1942 – 7 July 1943 (attached to Second Air Force, 31 August 1942, Army Air Forces, 6 October 1942 Eighth Air Force until 7 July 1943
- 15th Photographic Mapping Squadron (later 15th Photographic Squadron, 15th Combat Mapping Squadron, 15th Photographic Reconnaissance Squadron): 20 June 1942 – 21 June 1944 (attached to 5th Reconnaissance Group, 21 November 1943 – 21 June 1944)
- 23d Photographic Squadron (later 23d Photographic Reconnaissance Squadron): (attached 15 July – 8 September 1943, 9 February – 9 March 1944, 23 August – 15 November 1944 ); 15 November 1944 – 12 September 1945

Korean War

- 8th Tactical Reconnaissance Squadron: 26 September 1950 – 25 February 1951
- 45th Tactical Reconnaissance Squadron: 26 September 1950 – 25 February 1951
- 162d Tactical Reconnaissance Squadron: (attached from 26 September 1950) 10 November 1950 – 25 February 1951
- 363d Reconnaissance Technical Squadron c. 26 September 1950 – 25 February 1951
- 6166th Air Weather Reconnaissance Flight: 10 December 1950 – 25 February 1951

Intelligence since 1997

- 31st Intelligence Squadron, 1 April 1997 – 14 July 2006
- 93d Intelligence Squadron: c. 1 April 1997 – present
- 531st Intelligence Squadron, 1 July 2015 – present
- 543d Support Squadron: c. 6 August 2004 – unknown
- 668th Alteration and Installation Squadron: 22 June 2011 – present
- 743d Intelligence Support Squadron (Provisional): (attached 27 February 2012 – c. 2012)

=== Stations ===
- Peterson Field, Colorado, 20 June – 13 August 1942
- RAF Membury (Station 466), England, 8 September 1942
- RAF Steeple Morden (Station 122), England, 26 October – 22 November 1942
- Oran Es Sénia Airport, Algeria, 10 December 1942
- Maison Blanche Airport, Algeria, 25 December 1942
- La Marsa Airfield, Tunisia, 13 June 1943
- San Severo Airfield, Italy, 8 December 1943
- Pomigliano Airfield, Italy 4 January 1944
- Nettuno Airfield, Italy, 16 June 1944
- Viterbo Airfield, Italy, 26 June 1944
- Corsica, c. 14 July 1944
- Rosia Airfield, Italy, C. September 1944
- Florence Airfield, Italy, 17 January 1945
- Pomigliano Airfield, Italy, 26 August – 12 September 1945
- Itazuke Air Base, Japan, 26 September 1950
- Taegu Air Base, South Korea, 29 September 1950
- Komaki Air Base, Japan, 26 January – 25 February 1951
- Kelly Air Force Base (Medina Annex) (later Lackland Air Force Base, Joint Base San Antonio, Texas, 1 April 1997 – present

=== Aircraft ===
- Lockheed F-4 Lightning, 1942–1944
- Lockheed F-5 Lightning, 1943–1945
- Boeing B-17 Flying Fortress, 1942–1943
- Potez 540, 1943
- Supermarine Spitfire, 1943–1945
- Douglas A-20 Havoc, 1944–1945
- North American B-25 Mitchell, 1944–1945
- Douglas RB-26 Invader, 1950–1951
- North American F-51 Mustang, 1950–1951
- Lockheed RF-80 Shooting Star, 1950–1951
- North American T-6 Texan, 1950–1951

=== Awards and campaigns ===
Award streamer	Award	Dates	Notes
	Distinguished Unit Citation	28 August 1944	3d Photographic Group
	Air Force Outstanding Unit Award with Combat "V" Device	1 June 2001 – 31 May 2003	543d Intelligence Group
	Air Force Outstanding Unit Award	1 October 1997 – 30 September 1998	543d Intelligence Group
	Air Force Outstanding Unit Award	1 October 1999 – 30 September 2000	543d Intelligence Group
	Air Force Outstanding Unit Award	1 June 2004 – 31 May 2005	543d Intelligence Group
	Air Force Outstanding Unit Award	1 June 2006 – 31 December 2007	543d Intelligence Group
	Air Force Outstanding Unit Award	1 June 2008 – 31 May 2009	543d Intelligence Group (later 543d Intelligence, Surveillance and Reconnaissance Group)
	Air Force Outstanding Unit Award	1 January 2010 – 31 December 2010	543d Intelligence, Surveillance and Reconnaissance Group
	Air Force Outstanding Unit Award	1 January 2011 – 31 December 2011	543d Intelligence, Surveillance and Reconnaissance Group
	Air Force Outstanding Unit Award	1 January 2012 – 31 December 2012	543d Intelligence, Surveillance and Reconnaissance Group
	Air Force Outstanding Unit Award	1 January 2013 – 31 December 2013	543d Intelligence, Surveillance and Reconnaissance Group
	Air Force Outstanding Unit Award	1 January 2014 – 31 December 2014	543d Intelligence, Surveillance and Reconnaissance Group
	Korean Presidential Unit Citation	10 February 1951 – 25 February 1951	543d Tactical Support Group

Campaign Streamer	Campaign	Dates	Notes
	Tunisia	12 November 1942 – 13 May 1943	3d Photographic Group
	Sicily	14 May 1943 – 17 August 1943	3d Photographic Group (later 3rd Photographic Reconnaissance and Mapping Group)
	Naples-Foggia	18 August 1943 – 21 January 1944	3rd Photographic Reconnaissance and Mapping Group (later 3d Photographic Group)
	Anzio	22 January 1944 – 24 May 1944	3d Photographic Group
	Rome-Arno	22 January 1944 – 9 September 1944	3d Photographic Group
	Southern France	15 August 1944 – 14 September 1944	3d Photographic Group
	North Apennines	10 September 1944 – 4 April 1945	3d Photographic Group
	Po Valley	3 April 1945 – 8 May 1945	3d Photographic Group
	Rhineland	15 September 1944 – 21 March 1945	3d Photographic Group
	Central Europe	22 March 1944 – 21 May 1945	3d Photographic Group (later 3d Reconnaissance Group)
	Air Combat, EAME Theater	8 September 1942 – 11 May 1945	3d Photographic Group (also 3rd Photographic Reconnaissance and Mapping Group)
	UN Offensive	26 September 1950 – 2 November 1950	543d Tactical Support Group
	CCF Intervention	3 November 1950 – 24 January 1951	543d Tactical Support Group
	1st UN Counteroffensive	25 January 1951 – 25 February 1951	543d Tactical Support Group

== See also ==
- List of United States Air Force Groups
- List of P-38 Lightning operators
- List of A-20 Havoc operators
- List of A-26 Invader operators
