= 1st Photographic Group =

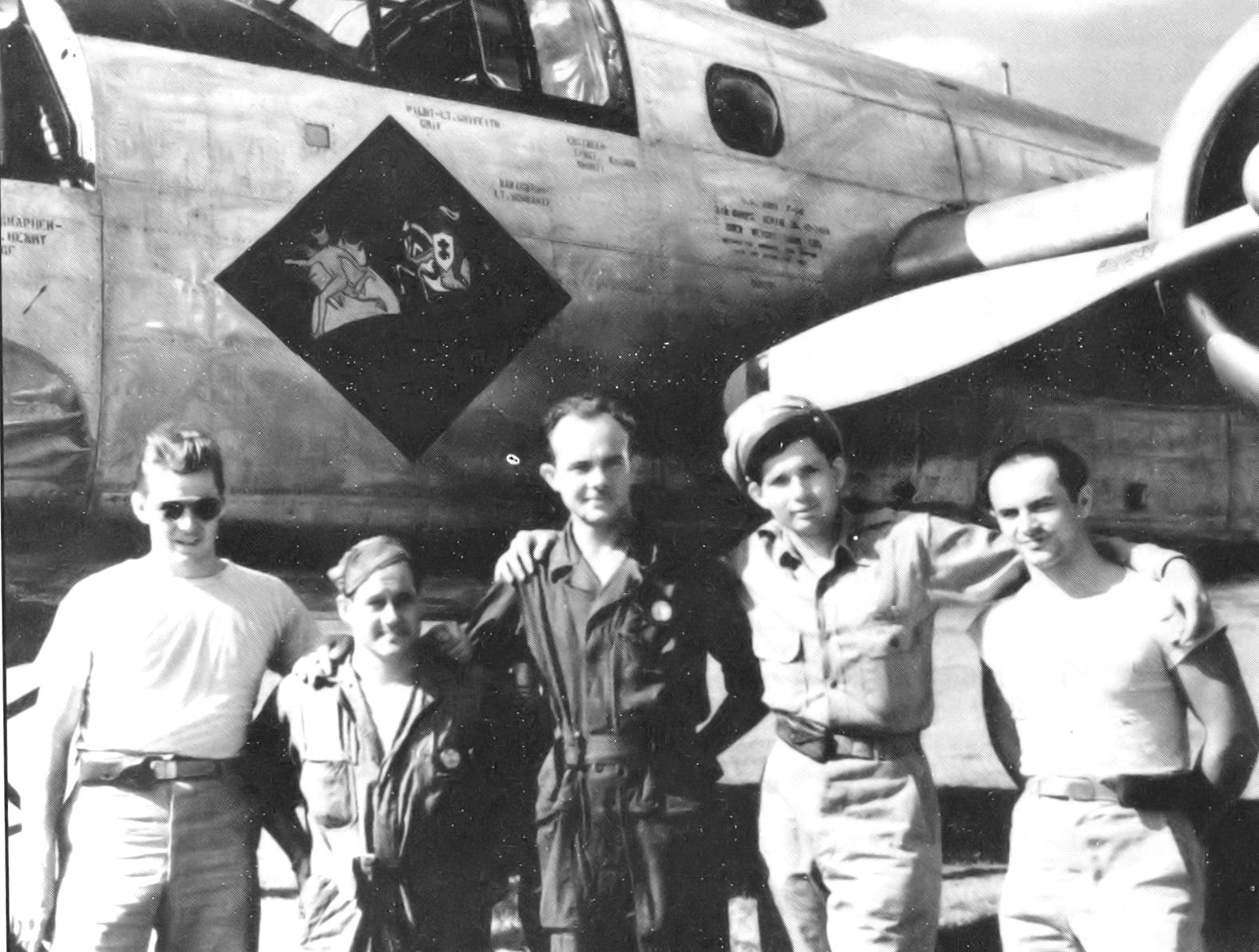
- A crew of the 91st Photographic Mapping Squadron in 1944
- Active: 1941–1944
- Country: United States
- Branch: United States Army; United States Air Force
- Role: Aerial reconnaissance
- Mottos: Fideliter et Diligenter Latin Faithfully and Diligently

Insignia
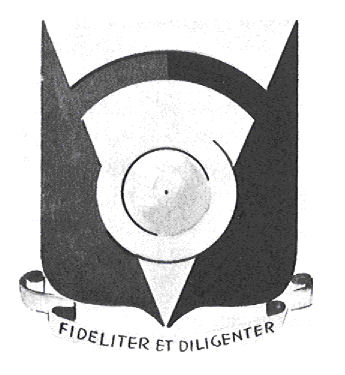
- 1st Photographic Charting Group emblem (Note: Heraldic description: Per pale, vert and azure, a pile or debruised by a barrulet arched of the field upon and over the pile a camera lens proper, rimmed sable.) (Note: Approved 24 October 1942.)

The 1st Photographic Group is an inactive United States Army Air Forces unit. It was organized in the spring of 1941, and was the Army Air Force's only non combat mapping unit until December 1943, when a second group was formed. From early 1944 it was assigned to the 311th Photographic Wing. It was disbanded on 5 October 1944, and its personnel and equipment absorbed by the 311th Wing, but it was reconstituted in 1985 as the 358th Special Operations Group. It has not been active since.

== History ==
The 1st Photographic Group was organized at Bolling Field in June 1941, drawing its cadre from the 1st Photographic Squadron as GHQ Air Force expanded its capability for photographic mapping and to conduct experiments in long range photographic reconnaissance, drawing from the experience of the Royal Air Force, which was involved in combat operations. In addition to the 1st at Bolling, its original components included the newly-activated 2nd Photographic Squadron at Gray Field, Washington, 3rd Photographic Squadron at Maxwell Field, Alabama and 4th Photographic Squadron at Moffett Field, California. Operational control of the four squadrons was given to the four continental numbered air forces.

Prior to April 1942, Army Air Forces (AAF) bombardment groups had attached or assigned reconnaissance squadrons, although these squadrons actually received more training on their secondary bombing mission than what was (on paper) their primary mission. In April, the AAF recognized this arrangement by redesignating these units as bombardment squadrons and transferring the mission to the group and photographic reconnaissance units that were later organized. Following the attack on Pearl Harbor, the group assisted observation groups in training reconnaissance units, although its participation was limited because each of its squadrons was busily engaged in carrying out mapping missions for hemisphere defense.

During the Second World War, the group charted and mapped areas of the United States and sent detachments to perform similar functions in Alaska, Canada, Africa (including Operation Rusty), the Middle East, India, the Caribbean, Mexico, Central and South America, and the Kurils.

In December 1943, the AAF activated a second mapping group in the United States, the 11th Photographic Group, at Reading Army Air Field, Pennsylvania. The 1st, 3rd, and 19th Photographic Charting Squadrons were transferred to the new group.

In February 1944, the AAF organized the 311th Photographic Wing, and assigned both the 1st and 11th Groups to it. On 5 October 1944, both groups were disbanded and their components assigned directly to the wing. The group was transferred in inactive status to the newly created United States Air Force in 1947. It was reconstituted on 31 July 1985 as a special operations unit, but was not activated.

== Lineage ==
- Constituted as the 1st Photographic Group on 15 May 1941

Activated on 10 June 1941
Redesignated 1st Mapping Group 13 January 1942
Redesignated 1st Photographic Charting Group c. 11 August 1943
Disbanded on 5 October 1944

- Reconstituted on 31 July 1985 and redesignated 358th Special Operations Group

=== Assignments ===
- General Headquarters Air Force (later Air Force Combat Command), 10 June 1941
- Second Air Force, 13 October 1942
- 311th Photographic Wing, 5 March – 5 October 1944

=== Squadrons ===
- 1st Photographic Squadron (later 1st Mapping Squadron, 1st Photographic Mapping Squadron, 1st Photographic Charting Squadron): 10 June 1941 – 1 December 1943
- 2d Photographic Squadron (later 2d Mapping Squadron, 2d Photographic Mapping Squadron, 2d Photographic Charting Squadron): 10 June 1941 – 5 October 1944
- 3d Photographic Squadron (later 3d Mapping Squadron, 3d Photographic Mapping Squadron, 3d Photographic Charting Squadron): 10 June 1941 – 1 December 1943
- 4th Photographic Squadron (later 4th Mapping Squadron, 4th Photographic Mapping Squadron, 4th Photographic Charting Squadron): 10 Jun 1941 – 5 Oct 1944
- 6th Photographic Squadron: 13 November 1943 – 5 October 1944
- 19th Photographic Charting Squadron: assigned 11 August 1943, attached 19 November – 1 December 1943
- 91st Photographic Mapping Squadron: 9 October 1943 – 5 October 1944<

=== Stations ===
- Bolling Field, District of Columbia, 10 June 1941
- Peterson Field, Colorado, 23 December 1943
- Buckley Field, Colorado, 2 July – 5 October 1944

=== Aircraft ===
- Douglas A-20 Havoc
- Lockheed A-29 Hudson
- Douglas B-18 Bolo
- Boeing B-17 Flying Fortress
- Consolidated B-24 Liberator
- Beechcraft F-2 Expeditor
- Douglas F-3 Havoc
- Consolidated F-7 Liberator
- North American B-25 Mitchell
- North American F-10 Mitchell
