= Bryce Poe II =

United States Air Force general

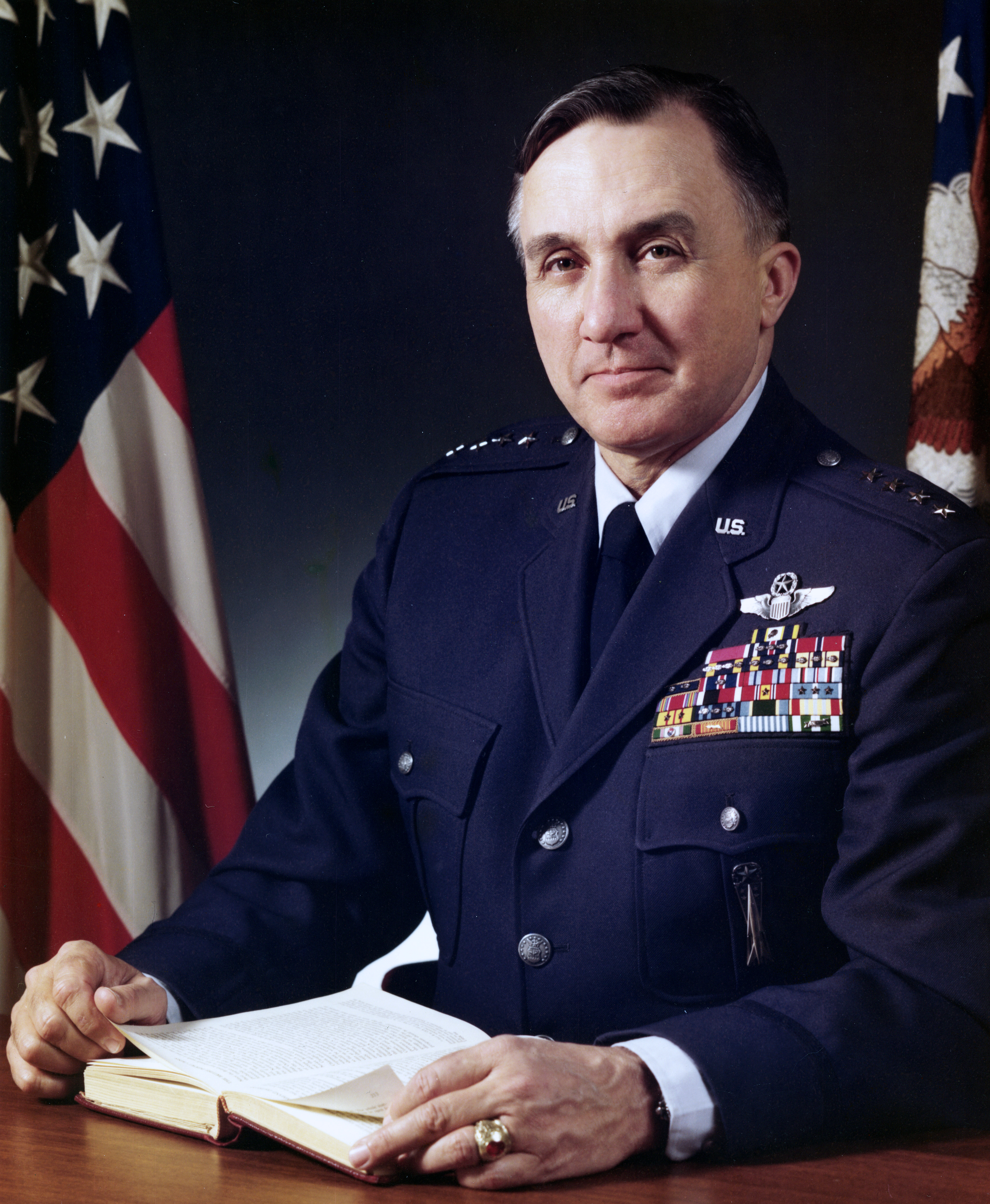
- General Bryce Poe II
- Born: October 10, 1924; Wichita, Kansas, U.S.
- Died: November 20, 2000 (aged 76); Alexandria, Virginia, U.S.
- Military career
- Allegiance: United States of America
- Branch: United States Air Force
- Service years: 1946-1981
- Rank: General
- Commands: Air Force Logistics Command
- Conflicts: Korean War; Vietnam War
- Awards: Air Force Distinguished Service Medal (2); Legion of Merit; Distinguished Flying Cross (4); Bronze Star; Air Medal (21)

Bryce Poe II (October 10, 1924 – November 20, 2000) was a United States Air Force four-star general who served as Commander, Air Force Logistics Command (COMAFLC) from 1978 to 1981.

== Military career ==
Poe was born in 1924, in Wichita, Kansas. He attended the Colorado School of Mines, the University of Kansas, and graduated from the United States Military Academy in 1946. He completed Army Air Forces pilot training prior to graduation from the academy. He received a Master of Arts degree in history from the University of Omaha in 1964 and a Master of Science degree in international affairs from The George Washington University, in 1965. He is a graduate of the Armed Forces Staff College in Norfolk, Virginia and the National War College at Fort Lesley J. McNair.

From November 1946 to September 1948, Poe was a member of one of the first jet-equipped units in the U.S. Air Force and flew in more than 80 air shows demonstrating the new aircraft. He then transferred to Japan and was assigned to the 8th Tactical Reconnaissance Squadron, which was equipped with RF-80As.

At the beginning of the Korean War, he transferred to South Korea and flew 90 combat missions including the first U.S. Air Force jet reconnaissance sortie. He returned to the United States and, from January to April 1951, was assigned to a Strategic Air Command fighter escort squadron at Bergstrom Air Force Base, Texas. He then transferred to Shaw Air Force Base, South Carolina, as commander of a reconnaissance replacement training unit.

Poe was assigned to Allied Forces Northern Europe, Oslo, Norway, in August 1952 as a fighter operations officer flying de Havilland Vampires, Gloster Meteors, F-84 Thunderjets and F-86 Sabres with the Royal Norwegian and Royal Danish air forces. He returned to the United States in July 1956 and served as aide and then executive officer to General Bernard Adolph Schriever, commander, Air Force Western Development Division in Inglewood, California.

In August 1959 he entered the Armed Forces Staff College. After graduation in January 1960, he went to Offutt Air Force Base, Nebraska, as operations officer of an Atlas D squadron. In October 1961 he transferred to SAC headquarters as a missile plans officer and later as chief, Missile Plans Section, Operations and Training Division. In August 1964 Poe entered the National War College. Following his graduation in July 1965, he served as chief, Plans Group, Office of Legislative Liaison, Office of the Secretary of the Air Force, Washington, D.C. He transferred to Bergstrom Air Force Base in July 1967 as vice commander of the 75th Tactical Reconnaissance Wing.

He went to Southeast Asia in July 1968 as vice commander, 460th Tactical Reconnaissance Wing, Tan Son Nhut Air Base, Republic of Vietnam. During this tour of duty, he flew 213 combat missions, 200 in RF-4s.

From July 1969 to July 1970, Poe was commander of the 26th Tactical Reconnaissance Wing, Ramstein Air Base, Germany. In July 1970 he assumed duties as deputy chief of staff, logistics, U.S. Air Forces in Europe, Wiesbaden, Germany.

Poe became commander of the Ogden Air Materiel Area (now Ogden Air Logistics Center) at Hill Air Force Base, Utah, in February 1973. In June 1974 he returned to Germany as vice commander in chief of the U.S. Air Forces in Europe at Ramstein Air Base.

He was assigned to Wright-Patterson Air Force Base in July 1976 as commander of the Air Force Acquisition Logistics Division and assumed commander of AFLC in February 1978.

He retired from the Air Force on July 31, 1981, and died of a stroke on November 20, 2000.

== Awards and decorations ==
US Air Force Command Pilot Badge
Master Missile Maintenance Badge

Air Force Distinguished Service Medal with two bronze oak leaf clusters
Legion of Merit
Distinguished Flying Cross with three oak leaf clusters
Bronze Star
Air Medal with nineteen oak leaf clusters
Air Force Commendation Medal with three oak leaf clusters
Air Force Presidential Unit Citation with two oak leaf clusters
Air Force Outstanding Unit Award with oak leaf cluster
Combat Readiness Medal
American Campaign Medal
World War II Victory Medal
Army of Occupation Medal with "Japan" clasp
National Defense Service Medal with one bronze service star
Korean Service Medal with three service stars
Vietnam Service Medal with two service stars
Air Force Longevity Service Award with silver and three bronze oak leaf clusters
Small Arms Expert Marksmanship Ribbon
Vietnam Armed Forces Honor Medal, 1st class
Order of National Security Merit, Tong-il Medal (Republic of Korea)
Order of the White Elephant, Knight Grand Cross (Thailand)
Cross of Aeronautical Merit, White Distinction (Spain)
King Faisal Medal, 1st class (State of Saudi Arabia)
Republic of Korea Presidential Unit Citation
Vietnam Gallantry Cross Unit Award
United Nations Korea Medal
Vietnam Campaign Medal
