= 318th Operations Support Squadron =

- Active: 1942–1944; 2011-present
- Country: United States
- Branch: United States Air Force
- Type: Information operations support
- Part of: Air Force Space Command
- Garrison/HQ: Lackland Air Force Base, Texas
- Nickname: Nighthawks
- Mottos: "Swoop, Strike, Kill."
- Colors: Blue, Black, White
- Mascot: Knighthawk

Insignia
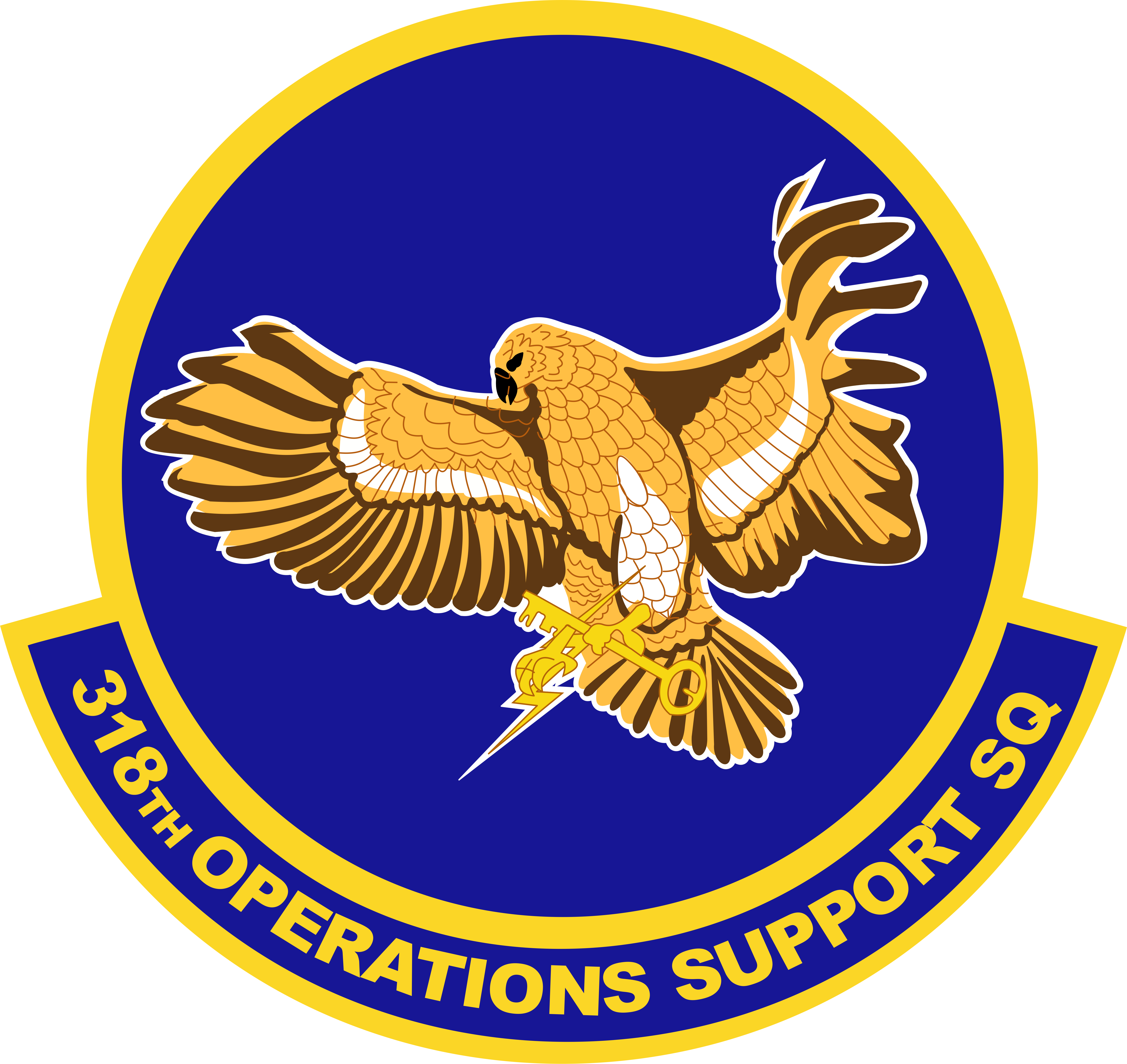
- 318th Operations Support Squadron emblem

The United States Air Force's 318th Operations Support Squadron is an operations support squadron located at Joint Base San Antonio, Texas.

== Mission ==
The mission of the 318th Squadron is to "Deliver relevant, validated, tactics, intelligence, and synchronized capabilities to cyberspace warfighters while providing mission support throughout the 688th Cyberspace Wing."

== History ==
The squadron was first activated at Columbia Army Air Base, South Carolina on 1 May 1943 as the 318th Airdrome Squadron. The squadron provided support to the 309th Bombardment Group, a Replacement Training Unit that trained replacement aircrews using B-25 Mitchell aircraft. However, the AAF was finding that standard military units, based on relatively inflexible tables of organization were proving less well adapted to performing the training and support missions. Accordingly, a more functional system was adopted in which each base was organized into a separate numbered unit. As a result, in 1944, the squadron was disbanded and merged into the 329th Army Air Force Base Unit (Replacement Training Unit, Medium, Bombardment).

The squadron was reactivated in 2011, replacing the 23d Information Operations Squadron as the support organization for the 318th Information Operations Group.

== Lineage ==
- Constituted as the 318th Airdrome Squadron (Special) c. 13 April 1943
- Activated on 1 May 1943
- Disbanded on 1 May 1944
- Reconstituted on 10 November 2011 and redesignated 318th Operations Support Squadron
- Activated on 7 December 2011

=== Assignments ===
- Probably Third Air Force, 1 May 1943 – 1 May 1944
- 318th Information Operations Group (later 318th Cyberspace Operations Group), 7 December 2011 – present

=== Stations ===
- Columbia Army Air Base, South Carolina, 1 May 1943 – 1 May 1944
- Joint Base San Antonio, Texas, 7 December 2011 – present

=== Campaigns ===
Campaign Streamer	Campaign	Dates	Notes
	American Theater without inscription	1 May 1943 – 1 May 1944	318th Airdrome Squadron

== See also ==
- Twenty-Fourth Air Force
