= Operation Bloodstone =

Covert CIA operation during the Cold War

Operation Bloodstone was a covert operation whereby the Central Intelligence Agency (CIA) sought anti-communists (including former Nazis) living in Soviet-controlled areas, to work undercover for U.S. intelligence inside the Soviet Union, Latin America, and Canada, as well as domestically within the United States. The operation was highly secretive and required participants to undergo extensive training before deployment.

== History ==
=== Background ===
In the early days of the Cold War in 1947, the U.S. State Department became a central hub for influential policymakers and Cold War strategists. Frank Wisner, encouraged by Undersecretary Dean Acheson, took a position as the deputy head of the State Department's Office of Occupied Territories under Charles Saltzman, a former head of the New York Stock Exchange. Wisner also represented the State Department on the State-Army-Navy-Air Force Coordinating Committee (SANACC), which was tasked with developing psychological warfare strategies to counter Soviet influence.

Wisner’s concerns were shaped by George Kennan's "Long Telegram," which warned of Soviet expansionism through subversion, propaganda, and intimidation rather than direct military conflict. The U.S. government feared that the Soviet Union was working to undermine Western societies by infiltrating political institutions, labor unions, and security forces.

In the summer of 1947, Wisner visited displaced persons (DP) camps in Germany, which housed around 700,000 Eastern European refugees who had fled from Soviet advances during World War II. Many of these refugees, including Ukrainians, Poles, Czechs, and Hungarians, had fought against the Soviet Union and were strongly anti-communist. Wisner saw potential in recruiting and training them to act as a secret force capable of infiltrating communist territories. While some potential recruits had served in Nazi forces and possibly committed war crimes, Wisner believed that their shared opposition to communism outweighed these past actions.

==== Timeline of Soviet takeover of Eastern Europe ====
Country	Year	Methods used
Albania	1945	A communist government took power at the end of World War II.
Bulgaria	1946	In 1946 the Bulgarian monarchy was abolished and later that year a communist government was elected and gradually eradicated its opponents.
East Germany	1945	East Germany was part of the Soviet zone of occupation agreed at the Yalta Conference and in 1949 the Soviets set up a communist regime after West Germany was created.
Romania	1945	In the 1945 elections, a communist-led coalition (made up of more than one political party) government was elected. The Communists gradually removed their coalition partners and abolished the Romanian monarchy.
Poland	1947	Fearing that a non-communist government would be elected in 1947, 16 non-communist politicians were invited to a conference on their eventual entry to the Soviet-backed Provisional Government, where they were arrested. With their political opponents removed, the Polish communists won the election.
Hungary	1948	Although non-communists won the 1945 election, a communist politician, Mátyás Rákosi, took control of the secret police and used it to arrest and execute his political opponents. By 1948 the Communist Party was in complete control of the country.
Czechoslovakia	1948	Czechoslovakia was the last country in Eastern Europe to fully fall to communism in 1948. At elections that year only communists were allowed to stand and a communist government was duly elected.

Upon returning to Washington, Wisner established a study group to explore how these refugees could serve U.S. national interests. By May 1948, the group proposed a plan to recruit anti-communist émigrés to counter Soviet influence through propaganda and infiltration. Wisner admired how communist groups used civic organizations, labor unions, and intellectual circles for subversion and believed that similar tactics could be employed by the West.The program, code-named Bloodstone, sought $5 million in covert funding to support these efforts. However, Wisner recognized that SANACC lacked the operational capacity to carry out such a program and argued for the creation of a dedicated U.S. propaganda agency. Initially proposed by the U.S. State Department, and approved by SANACC on June 10, 1948. In the initial stages of the operation, a brief paper identified these anti-Communist elements in non-Western hemisphere countries outside the Soviet orbit who "have shown extreme fortitude in the face of the Communist menace" and have "demonstrated the know-how to counter Communist propaganda and techniques to obtain control of mass movements." Operation Bloodstone sought to tap these individuals who were "immobilized" due to lack of funds and a coordinated international movement. In July, SANACC expanded the operation to:

comprise those activities against the enemy which are conducted by Allied or friendly forces behind enemy lines ... [to] include psychological warfare, subversion, sabotage, and miscellaneous operations such as assassination, target capture and rescue of Allied airmen.

By 1976, Operation Bloodstone was no longer a closely guarded secret, but an investigation revealed that two other highly classified programs were connected to it: Operation Paperclip and Alsos Mission.

== See also ==
- Counterintelligence Corps
- Operation Osoaviakhim
- Operation Condor
- Operation Paperclip
- Operation Rusty
- Operation Sunrise (World War II)
- U.S. intelligence involvement with German and Japanese war criminals after World War II
