= 90th Air Division =

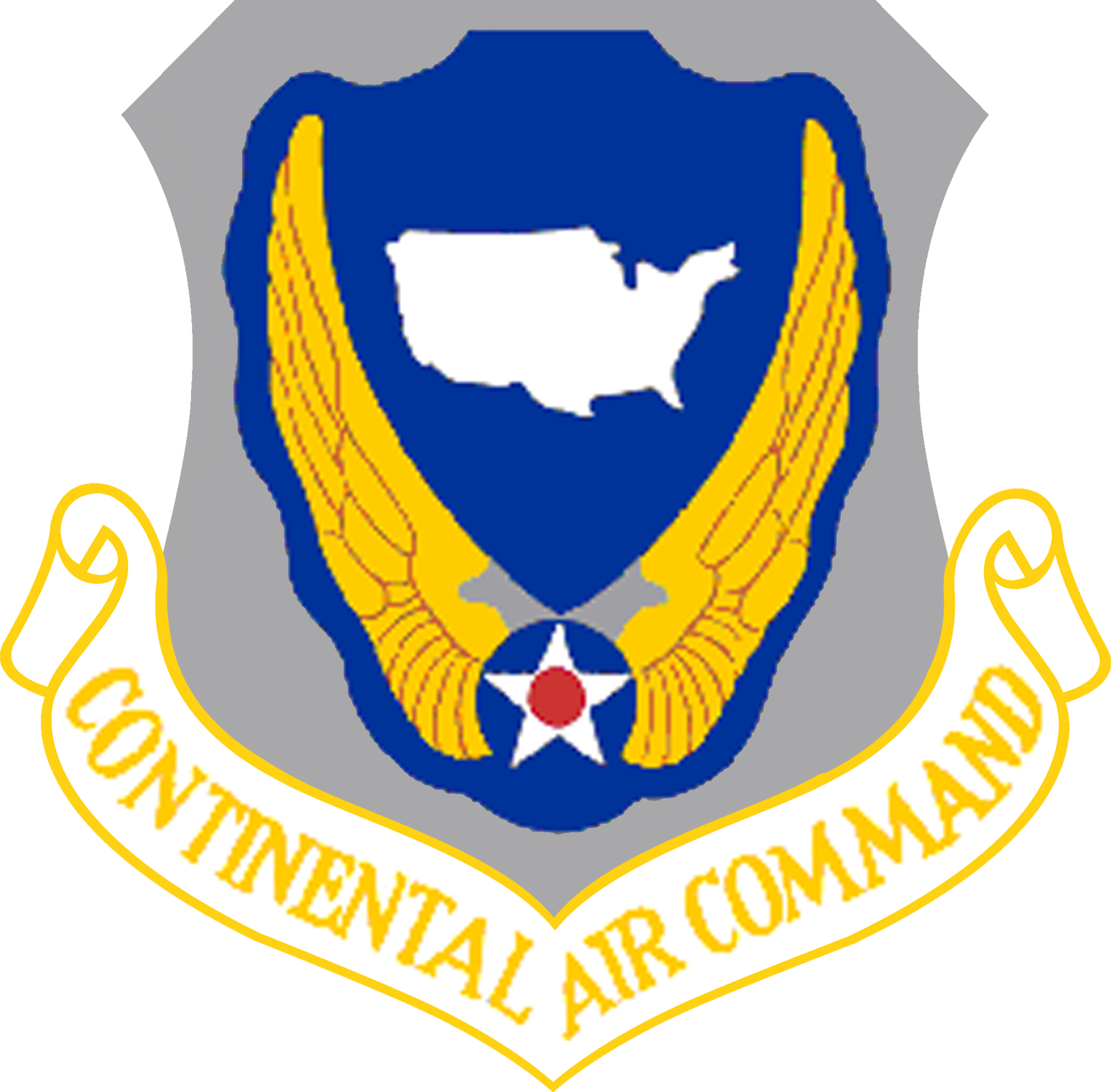
90th Air Division, Reconnaissance

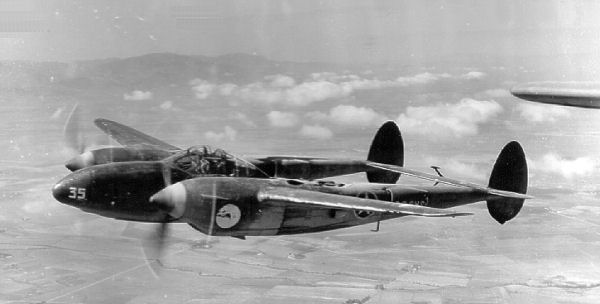
- F-4 Lightning of the 3d Photographic Group
- Active: 1943–1945;1946–1949
- Country: United States
- Branch: United States Air Force
- Role: Command of reconnaissance units
- Part of: Continental Air Command
- Decorations: Mediterranean Theater of Operations

The 90th Air Division is an inactive United States Air Force unit. Its last assignment was with First Air Force at Naval Air Station Niagara Falls, New York. It was inactivated on 27 June 1949.

== History ==
The 90th Air Division was primarily a World War II Photo-Reconnaissance command and control organization, assigned to the Mediterranean Theater of Operations .

"The 90th's subordinate units reconnoitered airdromes, roads, marshalling yards, and harbors in Italy after the Allied landings at Salerno in September 1943. They also flew missions to Italy, France, Germany, Austria, Czechoslovakia, Poland, and the Balkans. In addition, these units flew some photographic missions at night using specially equipped B-17 and B-25 aircraft. In January 1944, they covered the Anzio area and continued to support the Fifth Army in its drive through Italy by determining troop movements, gun positions, and terrain. The 90th's units last flew reconnaissance missions in connection with the invasion of southern France in August 1944. After transfer of its tactical groups on 1 October 1944, the wing aided in establishing a photo library for use in the European and Mediterranean theaters of operation."

"Activated in the Reserves at Niagara Falls, New York, from December 1946 to June 1949; in April 1948 it was redesignated as a division."

== Lineage ==
- Established as the 90 Photographic Wing, Reconnaissance on 11 October 1943

Activated on 22 November 1943
Redesignated 90 Reconnaissance Wing' on 23 June 1945
Inactivated on 23 October 1945

- Activated in the Reserve on 20 December 1946

Redesignated 90 Air Division, Reconnaissance on 16 April 1948
Inactivated on 27 June 1949

=== Assignments ===
- Twelfth Air Force, 22 November 1943
- Army Air Forces, 10 April – 23 October 1945 (attached to 311th Photographic Wing, until 1 June 1945
- First Air Force, 20 December 1946 – 27 June 1949

=== Components ===
- 3d Photographic Group, Reconnaissance: c. 15 August 1943 – 1 October 1944
- 5th Photographic Group, Reconnaissance: 22 November 1943 – 1 October 1944
- 26th Reconnaissance Group: 23 October 1947 – 27 June 1949
- 65th Reconnaissance Group: 17 October 1947 – 27 June 1949
- 32d Photographic Reconnaissance Squadron, 20 April – 15 November 1944

=== Stations ===
- La Marsa Airfield, Tunisia, 22 November 1943
- San Severo Airfield, Italy, 14 December 1943 – c. 4 April 1945
- Buckley Field, Colorado, c. 23 April – 23 October 1945
- Niagara Falls Airport, New York, 20 December 1946 – 27 June 1949

=== Aircraft ===
- Lockheed F-4 Lightning, 1943–1944
- Lockheed F-5 Lightning, 1943–1944
- Boeing B-17 Flying Fortress, 1944
- North American B-25 Mitchell, 1944
- de Havilland F-8 Mosquito, 1944
