= Nettuno Airfield =

Italian military airfield

Nettuno Airfield
- Part of Twelfth Air Force

Site information
- Type: Military airfield
- Controlled by: United States Army Air Forces

Location
- Coordinates: 41°27′11.40″N 012°41′51.71″E (Approximate)

Site history
- Built: 1945
- In use: 1944

Location of Nettuno Airfield, Italy

Nettuno Airfield is an abandoned World War II military airfield in Italy, which is located approximately 4 km east of Nettuno; about 50 km south-southeast of Rome.

It was an all-weather temporary field built by the United States Army Air Force XII Engineer Command using a graded earth compacted surface, with a prefabricated hessian (burlap) surfacing known as PHS. PHS was made of an asphalt-impregnated jute which was rolled out over the compacted surface over a square mesh track (SMT) grid of wire joined in 3-inch squares. Pierced Steel Planking was also used for parking areas, as well as for dispersal sites, when it was available. In addition, tents were used for billeting and also for support facilities; an access road was built to the existing road infrastructure; a dump for supplies, ammunition, and gasoline drums, along with a drinkable water and minimal electrical grid for communications and station lighting.

Once completed it was turned over for use by the Twelfth Air Force 3d Reconnaissance Group, which flew F-4 and F-5 Lightnings from the airfield between 16–26 June 1944.

Today, the end of the southeast main runway is visible on aerial photography of the Nettuno area.
