= Operation Rusty =

Operation Rusty, also referred to as Project Rusty, was an American top-secret airborne reconnaissance program carried out over North Africa and the Middle East during the spring of 1942. It is notable for many reasons, but especially because the driving force in the operation was Major Elliott Roosevelt, who acted in direct consultation with his father, President Franklin D. Roosevelt, the Chief of Staff of the Army, George Marshall, and the Air Forces commander, General Henry "Hap" Arnold.

== Planning ==
American plans to invade North Africa germinated in early 1942 (Operation Gymnast, which later became Operation Torch). Simultaneously became apparent the critical necessity of airborne logistics via Brazil, Africa, and the Middle East in order to supply the USSR, China, and even Australia. Mapping and reconnaissance of the affected areas, which were then in danger of being lost to the Axis, was given the highest priority.

In February 1942, Colonel Paul T. Cullen and Captain Elliott Roosevelt were ordered to conduct aerial photographic reconnaissance staging out of Accra in the Gold Coast (later Ghana). Cullen was a mapping specialist in charge of the United States Army Air Forces 1st Mapping Group, Bolling Field, D.C. Captain Roosevelt had just completed his navigator's training, and had in the previous summer obtained surveys of the North Atlantic ferry route in direct support of President Roosevelt's and Prime Minister Winston Churchill's urgent requirements. He had briefed the Allies on his project during the Argentia (Atlantic Charter) summit in August 1941, and had specifically advocated for the African route while visiting Churchill in England.

Under the aegis of the "special flight," 1st Mapping Group, two Boeing B-17Bs were modified at United Airlines modification center, Cheyenne, to carry 6 K-17 cameras in Trimetrogon configuration, and to fly at extreme altitudes and very long ranges. They were painted haze blue to minimize contrast with the sky, stripped of all unnecessary weight, and any identification marks were removed. The United States was not at war with Vichy-controlled French West Africa, and the overflights would be illegal.

== Execution ==
B-17B tail number 38-223, under the command of Captain Lovell S. Stuber, departed from Borinquen Field, Puerto Rico, for Trinidad on 9 April 1942. Contact was lost at 1242 Greenwich Civil Time, with last coordinates being 16°01′12″N 64°12′00″W, with the assumed loss of all on board. Theories held that the aircraft missed its destination and impacted high mountains in Venezuela.

The second aircraft is assumed by investigators to have been #39-5, which is officially listed (cryptically) as having crashed outside of the United States and having been stricken from inventory in 1942. Colonel Cullen was in charge, while Captain Roosevelt (who was not a pilot) concentrated on planning the flights and obtaining the photographs. This aircraft, given the nickname "the Blue Goose" proceeded via Brazil across the South Atlantic in April 1942. A support group of about twenty men arrived in Accra via ship.

During April, long range missions were conducted over most of North Africa, obtaining imagery of the major French, Spanish, and Italian support points, notably railways, ports, and aerodromes. According to some reports flights were also made as far as Chongqing, China, in order to map the Asian supply route. During this time Roosevelt was reported in Cairo for several days, at which time he was promoted to major. Various press reports touched obliquely on American air surveillance in the area, and noted the presence of the president's son. The aircraft was also reported operating out of Khartoum in the Anglo-Egyptian Sudan, Bathurst in the Gambia, the Firestone plantation in Liberia (the only airfield there), Maiduguri in Nigeria, and especially Fort Lamy in French Equatorial Africa (now Chad), which was then already Free French territory.

The aircraft was intercepted on occasion but was saved by its extreme altitude of over 30,000 feet. Within a few weeks, however, it was wrecked and unflyable. By early May Major Roosevelt returned to the White House bringing back "18,000 plates" and "they photographed everything they went after." His mother wrote to a friend, "Almost had to come down in the desert the last day. One engine nearly dropped off 850 miles from base over the desert but it froze and hung by hair & and after landing Elliott said the plane practically fell apart."

The personnel returned to the United States via Pan American Clipper N18609. Cullen and Roosevelt discussed the operation with the president, General Marshall, and General Arnold at the White House. Colonel Cullen wrote up a detailed report and intelligence estimate based on Rusty discoveries. It emphasized the vulnerability of the trans-African ferry route to a Vichy offensive, and generally overstated the capabilities and intentions of French forces in the area.

== Historical significance ==
Project Rusty was a highly ambitious and, the loss of one aircraft notwithstanding, successful mapping operation which would presage future Allied long-range reconnaissance over denied territory. Other, somewhat similar operations followed in support of the burgeoning global Air Transport Command route network. The lessons learned were important for the technical progress of aerial photography and mapping. Rusty facilitated planning for the landings in Morocco and Algeria in November 1942. It advanced the careers of Cullen and Roosevelt, both of whom later rose to Brigadier General.

One year later, participants were allowed to speak of the operation to the newspapers. However, by that time subsequent events had eclipsed its importance to the public. Despite the early secrecy, some details of the operation survive in General Arnold's archives, and in some writings of Elliott Roosevelt.

== Bibliography ==
- Goddard, George W.: Overview: A Lifelong Adventure in Aerial Photography. Doubleday, New York, 1969.
- Hansen, Chris. Enfant Terrible: The Times and Schemes of General Elliott Roosevelt. Tucson: Able Baker Press, 2012. ISBN 978-0615-66892-5
- Roosevelt, Elliott: As He Saw It. Duell, Sloan & Pierce, New York, 1946.
