= 26th Information Operations Wing =

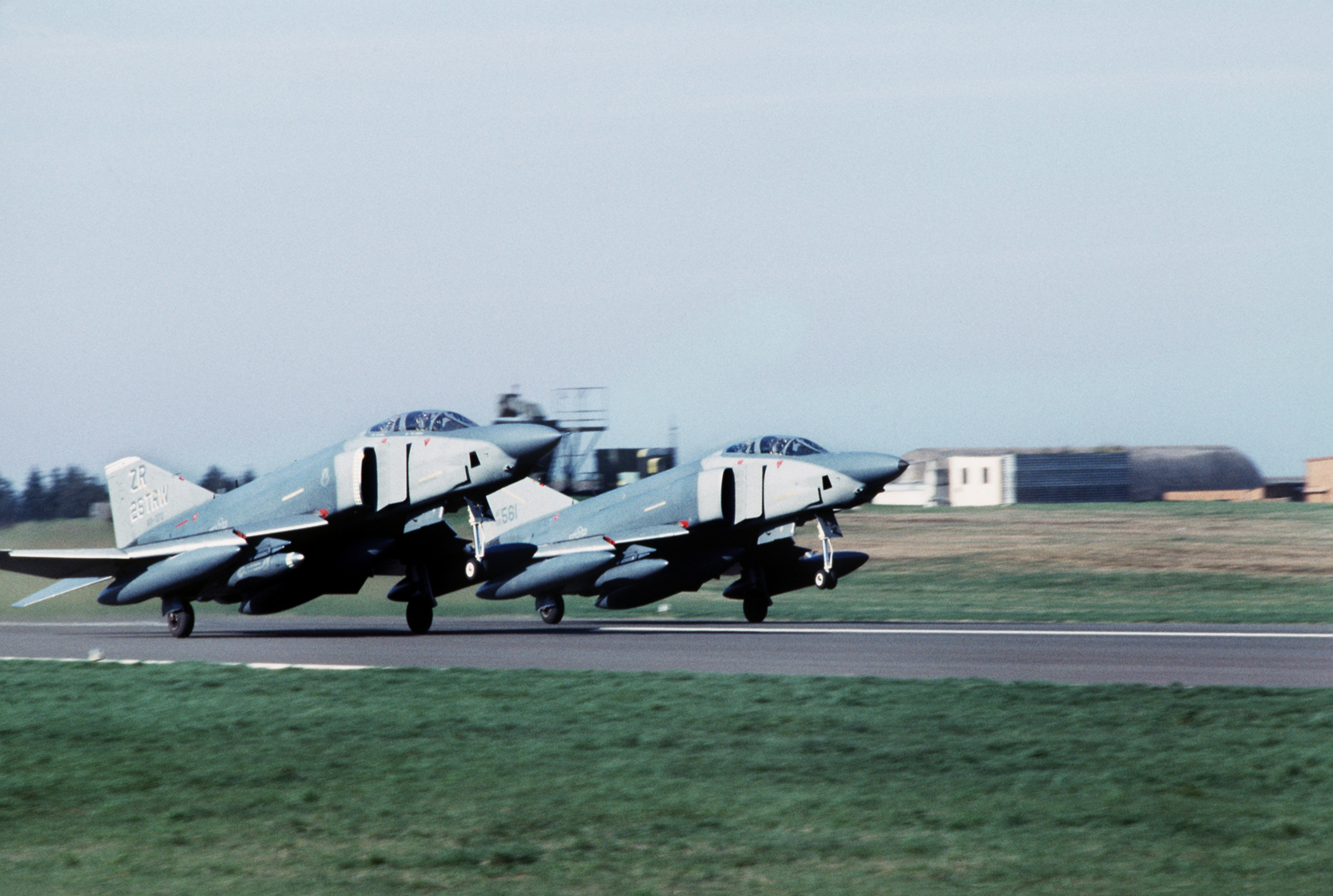
- Last wing RF-4Cs depart Zweibrücken Air Base
- Active: 1942–1947; 1952–1958; 1965–1991; 1991–2006
- Country: United States
- Branch: United States Air Force
- Role: Information warfare
- Mottos: Beware, We Snap (World War II) Saber es Poder (Spanish for 'Knowledge is Power') (1953-present)
- Decorations: Distinguished Unit Citation; Air Force Outstanding Unit Award

Commanders
- Notable commanders: Bryce Poe II

Insignia
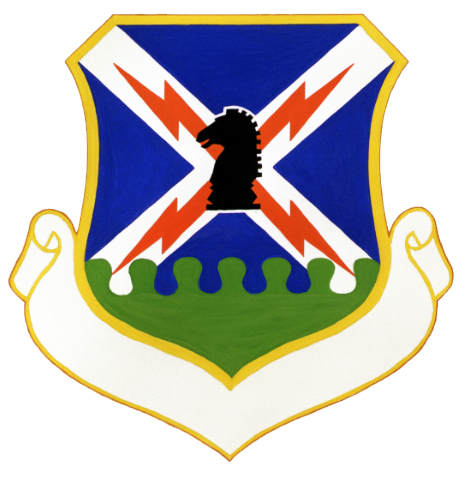
- 26th Information Operations Wing emblem

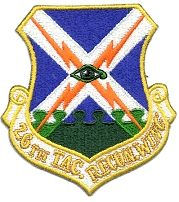
- Patch with 26th Strategic Reconnaissance Wing emblem (Note: Approved 4 September 1953.)

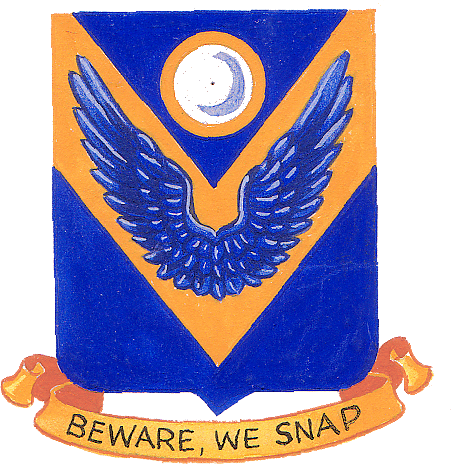
- 5th Photographic Group emblem (Note: Approved 25 January 1943.)

The 26th Information Operations Wing is an inactive United States Air Force unit. Its last assignment was with United States Air Forces in Europe at Ramstein Air Base, Germany, where it was inactivated on 5 July 2006.

The wing was first established during World War II as the 5th Photographic Group with Twelfth and Fifteenth Air Forces in the Mediterranean Theatre of Operations.

The 26th Strategic Reconnaissance Wing operated under the direction of Strategic Air Command from 1952 until 1958. The two units were consolidated in 1965 as the 26th Tactical Reconnaissance Wing and served for the next twenty-six years with United States Air Forces Europe. The wing was inactivated on 31 July 1991.

The wing was activated again as the 26th Intelligence Wing in late 1991, redesignated 26th Information Operations Wing in August 2000, and inactivated in July 2006.

== History ==
=== World War II ===
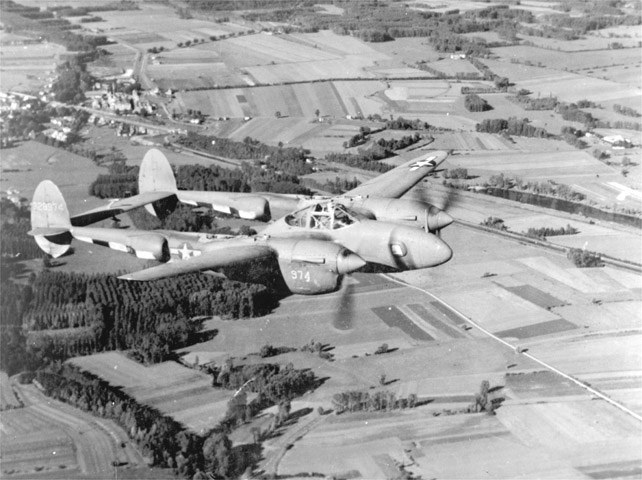
F-5E Lightning

The wing's first predecessor was activated in July 1942 as the 5th Photographic Group at what would become Peterson Field, Colorado with the 21st, 22d, 23d and 24th Photographic Mapping Squadrons assigned, although neither the group nor any of its squadrons would become operational until January 1943. However, by the time the group moved overseas in August 1943, only the 23d and 24th Squadrons remained assigned.

After training in the United States and participating in military exercises, the group moved to Tunisia and served in combat with Twelfth and Fifteenth Air Forces in the Mediterranean Theater of Operations. The unit operated primarily with Lockheed F-5 Lightnings, ranging as far as Germany and Poland. It also flew night photographic missions with its Boeing B-17F Flying Fortress and North American B-25D Mitchell aircraft. The 5th Group provided photographic coverage for landing areas for Operation Shingle, the Allied landings at Anzio.

The unit provided road and rail target reconnaissance for the United States Fifth Army and British Eighth Army and performed bomb damage assessment photography to measure the success of allied bombing. It flew missions to northwestern France to photograph rail targets to be attacked in preparation for Operation Overlord, the invasion of Normandy in June 1944. Closer to home, it performed similar missions for Operation Dragoon, the invasion of southern France in August. The group earned a Distinguished Unit Citation in September when it secured intelligence of Luftwaffe installations in the Balkans that enabled fighter aircraft to destroy large numbers of Luftwaffe fighters and transports.

The group remained in Italy after VE Day until October 1945, when it returned to the United States and was inactivated on arrival at the port of embarkation.

=== Strategic Air Command ===
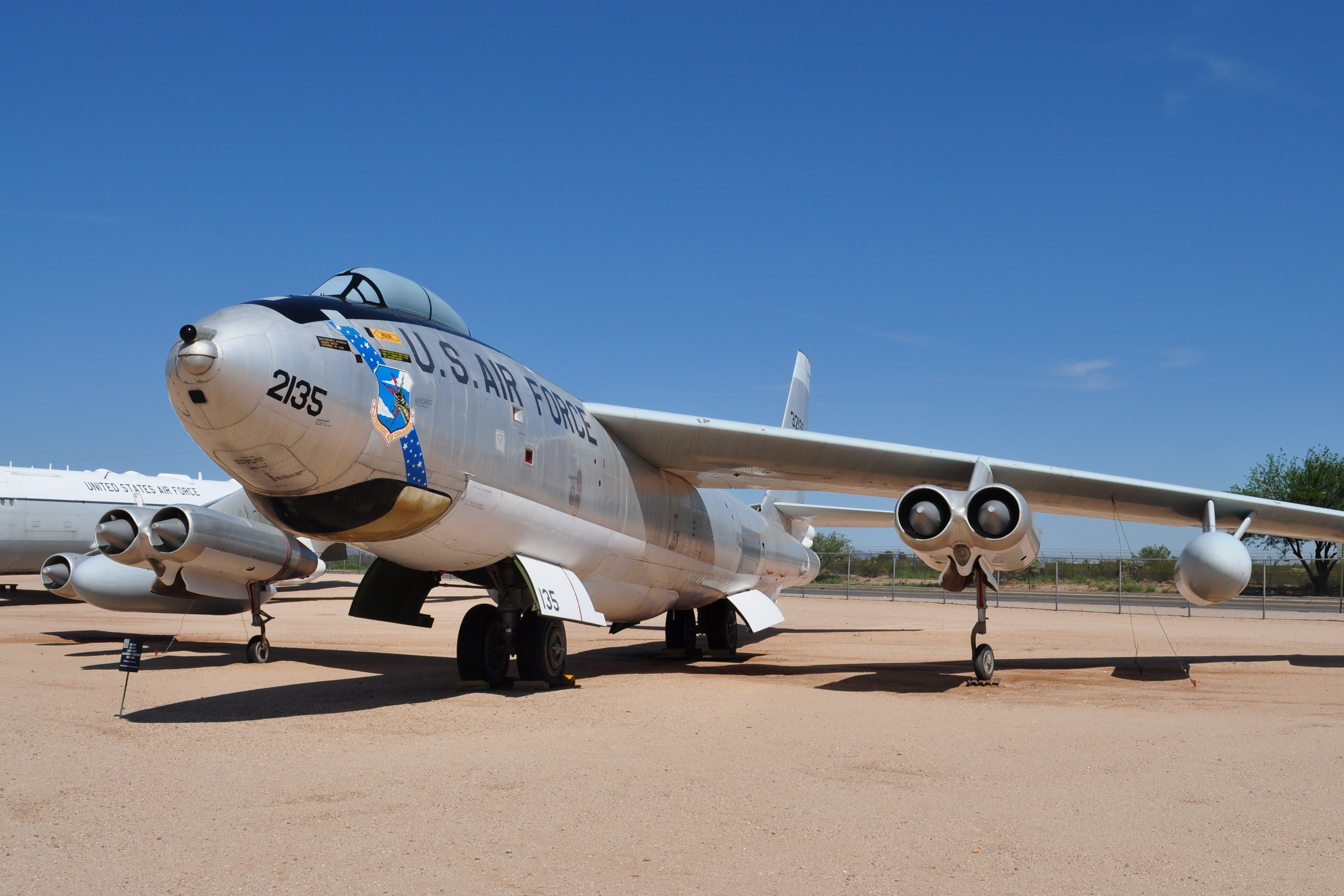
B-47E from Lockbourne AFB at Pima Air Museum

In May 1952 the 26th Strategic Reconnaissance Wing was activated under Strategic Air Command as one of two Boeing B-47 Stratojet wings at Lockbourne Air Force Base, Ohio, but was not fully manned until January 1953. The wing performed strategic reconnaissance and air refueling missions. The wing became non-operational in April 1958 and was inactivated in July.

=== Tactical Reconnaissance in Europe ===
The 5th Group and 26th Wing were consolidated in 1965 as the 26th Tactical Reconnaissance Wing and served for the next twenty-six years with United States Air Forces Europe. Exercising control of a deployed Aerospace Defense Command squadron, it also performed electronic countermeasure training through the late 1960s. From 1968 to 1973, it added an air defense responsibility. It performed day and night visual and photographic reconnaissance. From the fall of 1972 to spring of 1973 the wing also had a special operations mission.

With the end of the Cold War in 1990, the wing was gradually phased down. In addition, the 1960s-era McDonnell RF-4C Phantoms were increasingly costing more and more to maintain. Tactical reconnaissance was being handled by other means, and the need for the wing was becoming less critical to USAFE planners. As a result, the RF-4Cs of the wing were sent to AMARC on 1 April 1991 and the wing's remaining tactical squadron was inactivated. The wing was inactivated on 31 July 1991.

=== Intelligence operations ===
The 26th Intelligence Wing was activated in October. It was renamed the 26th Information Operations Wing in 2000 and inactivated in 2006.

== Lineage ==
5th Reconnaissance Group

- Established as the 5th Photographic Group on 14 July 1942

Activated on 23 July 1942
Redesignated 5th Photographic Reconnaissance and Mapping Group on 15 May 1943
Redesignated 5th Photographic Reconnaissance Group on 15 August 1943
Redesignated 5th Photographic Group, Reconnaissance on 13 November 1943
Redesignated 5th Reconnaissance Group on 4 May 1945
Inactivated on 28 October 1945
Disbanded on 6 March 1947
Reconstituted and consolidated with 26th Strategic Reconnaissance Wing on 19 April 1965

26th Strategic Reconnaissance Wing

- Constituted as the 26th Strategic Reconnaissance Wing, Medium on 9 May 1952

Activated on 28 May 1952
Inactivated on 1 July 1958
Consolidated with 5th Reconnaissance Group and redesignated 26th Tactical Reconnaissance Wing on 19 April 1965
Activated on 1 July 1965
Inactivated on 31 July 1991
Redesignated 26th Intelligence Wing
Activated on 1 October 1991
Redesignated 26th Information Operations Wing on 1 August 2000
Inactivated on 5 July 2006

=== Assignments ===
- Second Air Force, 23 July 1942
- Third Air Force, 8 March 1943
- Twelfth Air Force, 4 September 1943 (attached to Northwest African Photographic Reconnaissance Wing, until 21 November 1943)
- 90th Photographic Wing, 22 November 1943
- Fifteenth Air Force, 1 October 1944
- Army Service Forces, New York Port of Embarkation, c. 26 – 28 October 1945
- 801st Air Division, 28 May 1952 – 1 July 1958 (attached to 7th Air Division, 13 September – 29 October 1954)
- United States Air Forces in Europe, 1 July 1965 – 31 July 1991

=== Stations ===
- Army Air Base, Colorado Springs (later Peterson Field), Colorado, 23 July 1942 – 8 August 1943
- La Marsa Airfield, Tunisia, 8 September 1943
- San Severo Airfield, Italy, 8 December 1943
- Bari Airfield, Italy, 11 October 1944 – Oct 1945
- Camp Kilmer, New Jersey, 26 – 28 October 1945
- Lockbourne Air Force Base, Ohio, 28 May 1952 – 1 July 1958
- Toul-Rosières Air Base, France 1 July 1965
- Ramstein Air Base, Germany, 1 October 1966
- Zweibrücken Air Base, 31 January 1973 – 31 July 1991
- Ramstein Air Base, Germany, 1 October 1991 – 5 July 2006

=== Components ===
==== Operational Units ====
World War II

- 12th Photographic Squadron (later 12th Photographic Reconnaissance Squadron): attached 27 October – 21 November 1943
- 15th Photographic Squadron (later 15th Combat Mapping Squadron, 15th Photographic Reconnaissance Squadron): attached 21 November 1943 – 20 January 1944, assigned 21 January 1944 – 28 October 1945
- 21st Photographic Reconnaissance Squadron (later 21st Photographic Squadron): 2 September 1942 – 28 April 1943 (not operational until c. 12 January 1943)
- 22d Photographic Reconnaissance Squadron (later 22d Photographic Squadron): 2 September 1942 – 7 July 1943 (not operational until c. 12 January 1943; detached after 18 May 1943)
- 23d Photographic Reconnaissance Squadron (later 23d Photographic Squadron, 23d Photographic Reconnaissance Squadron): 2 September 1942 – 15 November 1944 (not operational until c. 12 January 1943; detached c. 15 July – 8 September 1943, 9 February – 9 March 1944, after 23 August 1944)
- 24th Photographic Mapping Squadron (later 24th Photographic Squadron, 24th Combat Mapping Squadron): 2 September 1942 – 9 October 1943 (not operational until c. 12 January 1943; detached after c. 8 August 1943)
- 32d Photographic Reconnaissance Squadron: attached 30 April – 14 November 1944, assigned 15 November 1944 – 28 October 1945
- 37th Photographic Mapping Squadron: 15 November 1944 – 28 October 1945

Strategic Air Command

- 3d Strategic Reconnaissance Squadron: 28 May 1952 – 1 July 1958 (not operational until 1 March 1953 and after 15 April 1958)
- 4th Strategic Reconnaissance Squadron: 28 May 1952 – 1 July 1958
- 10th Strategic Reconnaissance Squadron: 28 May 1952 – 1 July 1958 (not operational until c. 1 October 1953 and after 15 April 1958)
- 26th Air Refueling Squadron: 28 May 1952 – 1 April 1955 (detached until 31 May 1953)
- 321st Air Refueling Squadron: 16 August 1956 – 15 April 1958

United States Air Forces Europe

- 7th Special Operations Squadron: 17 March 1972 – 31 January 1973
- 7th Tactical Fighter Squadron: attached 24 August – 1 October 1971
- 8th Tactical Fighter Squadron: attached 15 September – 8 October 1970 and 24 August – 1 October 1971
- 17th Tactical Reconnaissance Squadron: 31 January 1973 – 1 January 1979
- 19th Tactical Reconnaissance Squadron: 1 July – 1 October 1965
- 22d Tactical Reconnaissance Squadron: 1 December 1965 – 20 September 1966; attached 9 – 26 October 1968 (Note: The 22d Tactical Reconnaissance Squadron is not related to the 22d Photographic Reconnaissance Squadron.)
- 32d Tactical Reconnaissance Squadron: 1 October 1965 – 15 August 1966
- 38th Tactical Reconnaissance Squadron: 1 January 1966 – 1 April 1991
- 526th Fighter-Interceptor (later, 526th Tactical Fighter) Squadron: 1 November 1968 – 31 January 1973
- 4713th Defense Systems Evaluation Squadron: attached 20 October – 4 November 1966, 21 May – 30 June 1967, 21 September – 6 October 1967.

==== Support Units ====
Groups

- 26th Combat Support Group: 1 July 1965 – 31 July 1991
- 26th Medical Group (later 26th Tactical Hospital): 28 July 1952 – 1 July 1958, 1 May 1967 – 15 January 1973, 31 January 1973 – c. 1988

Squadrons

- 4th Photographic Technical Squadron: October 1944 – September 1945
- 26th Armament and Electronics Maintenance Squadron (later 26th Avionics Maintenance Squadron, 26th Component Repair Squadron): 28 May 1953 – 1 July 1958, 1 July 1965 – 31 July 1991
- 26th Field Maintenance Squadron (later 26th Equipment Maintenance Squadron): 28 May 1953 – 1 July 1958, 1 July 1965 – 31 July 1991
- 26th Munitions Maintenance Squadron: 8 October 1972 – 15 January 1973
- 26th Periodic Maintenance Squadron (later 26th Organizational Maintenance Squadron, 26th Aircraft Generation Squadron): 28 May 1953 – 1 July 1958, 1 July 1965 – 1 January 1966, 31 January 1973 – 31 July 1991
- 26th Reconnaissance Technical Squadron: 1 July 1969 – 1 October 1971
- 326th Munitions Maintenance Squadron: 1 May 1970 – 7 October 1972
- Tactical Reconnaissance Intelligence Support Squadron, Provisional, 7426: attached c. 1 January 1985 – 15 March 1985
- 7426th Tactical Reconnaissance Intelligence Support Squadron: 15 March 1985 – c. 31 July 1991

Other

- USAF Dispensary, Ramstein (later USAF Clinic, Ramstein); 1 July 1971 – 31 January 1973
- USAF Clinic, Zweibrücken (later 26th Tactical Reconnaissance Wing Clinic): 31 January 1973 – 1 July 1991
- 26th Tactical Hospital (see 26th Medical Group): 1 May 1967 – 15 January 1973, 31 January 1973 – 31 July 1991

=== Aircraft ===
- Lockheed P-38F Lightning, 1942–1945
- Lockheed F-4 Lightning, 1942–1945
- Lockheed F-5 Lightning, 1943–1945
- Consolidated B-24J Liberator, 1943–1945
- Consolidated F-7 Liberator, 1943–1945
- Boeing B-17F Flying Fortress, 1943–1945
- Boeing F-9 Flying Fortress, 1943–1945
- North American B-25D Mitchell, 1943–1945
- North American F-10 Mitchell, 1943–1945
- Douglas A-20C Havoc, 1944–1945
- Douglas F-3 Havoc, 1944–1945
- Boeing RB-47 Stratojet, 1952–1958
- Boeing KC-97 Stratofreighter, 1952–1958
- Douglas RB-66B Destroyer 1965
- McDonnell RF-101C Voodoo, 1965
- McDonnell RF-4C Phantom 1965–1991
