= St. George Airport =

St. George Airport may refer to:

- St George Airport (Queensland) in St George, Queensland, Australia (IATA: SGO)
- St. George Airport (Alaska) in St. George, Alaska, United States (FAA: PBV, IATA: STG)
- St. George Airport (South Carolina) in St. George, South Carolina, United States (FAA: 6J2)
- St. George Regional Airport in St. George, Utah, United States (FAA/IATA: SGU), currently in operation
- St. George Municipal Airport in St. George, Utah, United States (FAA/IATA: SGU), in operation from 1972 to 2010
