= Western Sky Aviation Warbird Museum =

- Location within Utah
- Established: 2006
- Location: St. George, Utah
- Coordinates: 37.0346°N 113.5042°W
- Type: Aviation museum
- Founder: Jack Hunter
- Website: www.westernskywarbirds.org

The Western Sky Aviation Warbird Museum is an aviation museum located at the St. George Regional Airport in St. George, Utah.

== History ==
The museum was founded by Jack Hunter, a former United States Air Force colonel, and opened at the St. George Municipal Airport in 2006. The museum moved to the new St. George Regional Airport, where it reopened in 2011.

The museum acquired a C-54 in 2022.

== Collection ==
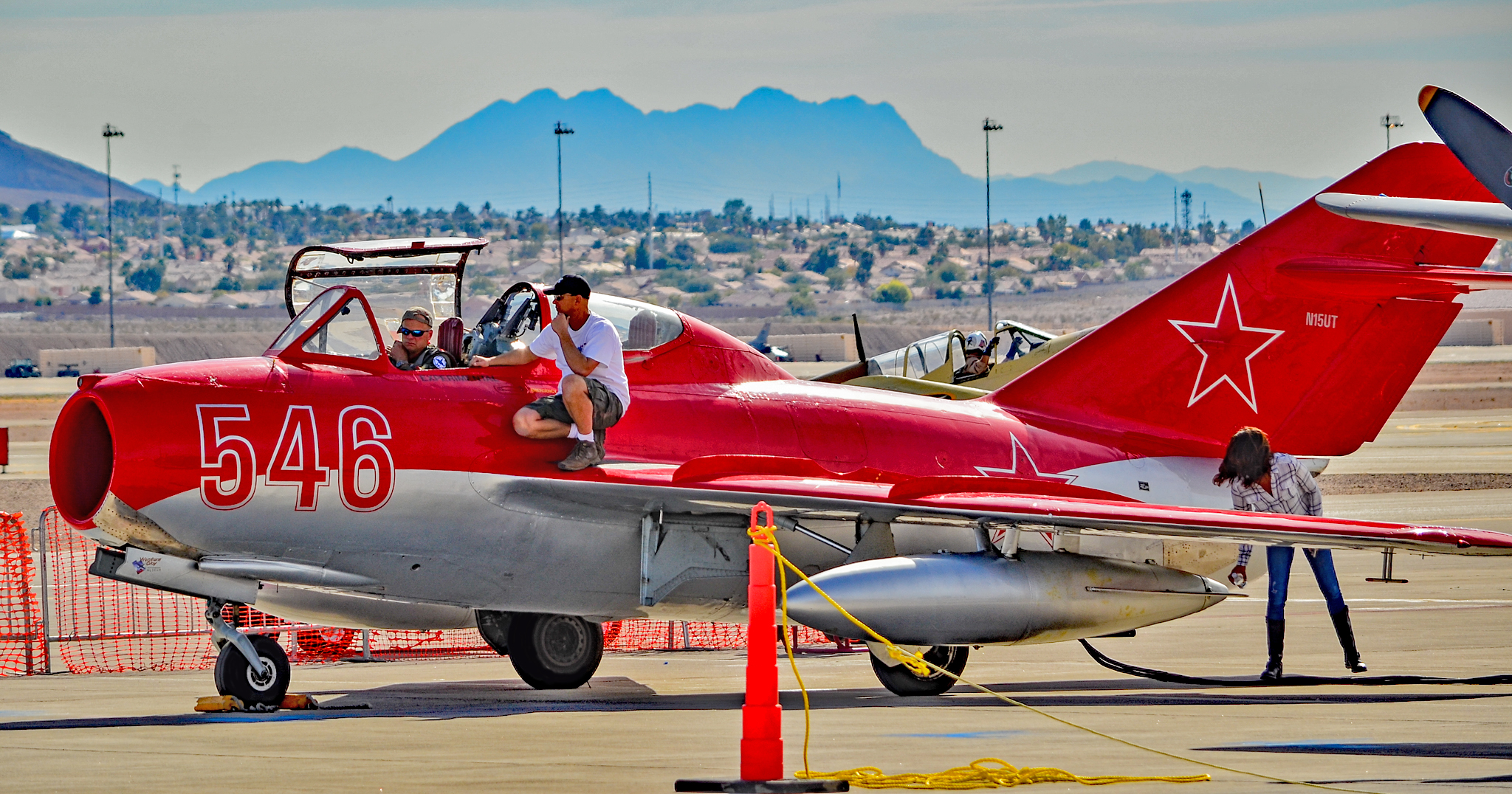
PZL-Mielec SBLim-2

- Aero L-29C Delfín
- BAC Jet Provost T.3A
- BAC Jet Provost T.3A
- Cessna A-37B Dragonfly
- Cessna T-37B Tweet
- Douglas C-54Q Skymaster
- Grega GN-1 Aircamper
- Northrop F-5B Freedom Fighter
- Northrop T-38A Talon
- PZL-Mielec Lim-5
- PZL-Mielec SBLim-2
- Shenyang J-2

== Events ==
The museum holds an annual hangar dance.

== See also ==
- List of aviation museums
