= KOGB =

KOGB may refer to:

- KOGB (FM), a defunct radio station (91.3 FM) formerly licensed to serve McGrath, Alaska, United States
- Orangeburg Municipal Airport (ICAO code KOGB)
