= S79 =

S79 may refer to:

- County Route S79 (Bergen County, New Jersey)
- Expressway S79 (Poland)
- Green Sea Airport in Horry County, South Carolina, United States
- INS Dolphin (S79), a submarine of the Israeli Navy
- S79 Select Bus Service (New York City bus) serving Staten Island
- Savoia-Marchetti S.79, an Italian bomber
