= Lee County Airport =

Lee County Airport may refer to:

- Lee County Airport (South Carolina) or Butters Field in Bishopville, South Carolina, United States (FAA: 52J)
- Lee County Airport (Virginia) in Jonesville, Virginia, United States (FAA: 0VG)
- Giddings-Lee County Airport in Giddings, Texas, United States (FAA: GYB)
- Marianna/Lee County Airport or Steve Edwards Field in Marianna, Arkansas, United States (FAA: 6M7)
- Sanford-Lee County Regional Airport in Sanford, North Carolina, United States (FAA: TTA)
