= Lake City Municipal Airport =

Lake City Municipal Airport may refer to:

- Lake City Municipal Airport (South Carolina) in Lake City, South Carolina, United States (FAA: 51J)
- Lake City Gateway Airport, formerly Lake City Municipal Airport, in Lake City, Florida, United States (FAA: LCQ)
