= 2015 Moncks Corner mid-air collision =

Accident in South Carolina, United States

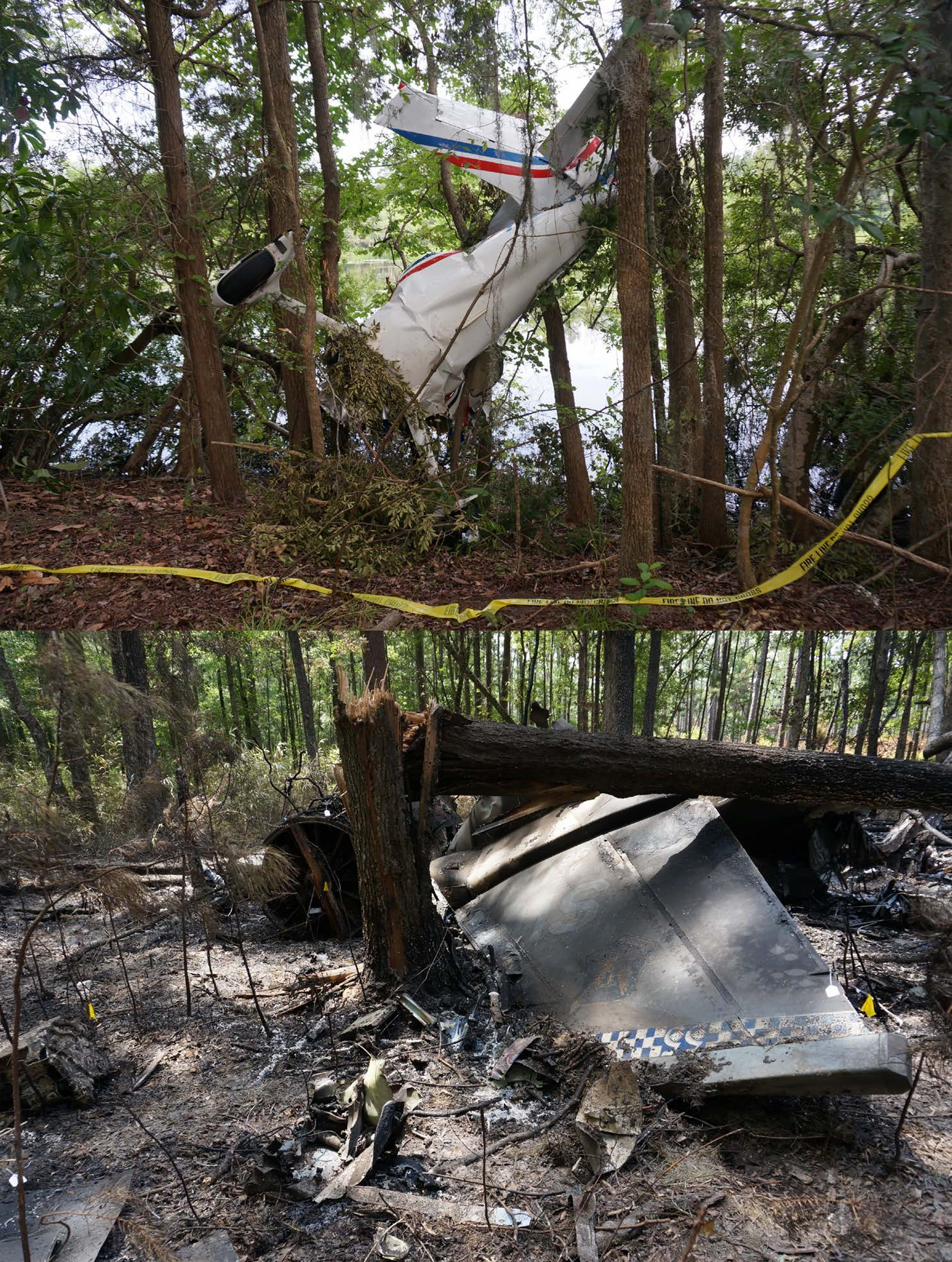
- The aft fuselage of the Cessna (top) and the main wreckage of the F-16 (bottom)

Accident
- Date: July 7, 2015
- Summary: Mid-air collision, due to air traffic control error
- Site: Moncks Corner, South Carolina, United States; 33.196°N 80.010°W
- Total fatalities: 2
- Total survivors: 1

First aircraft
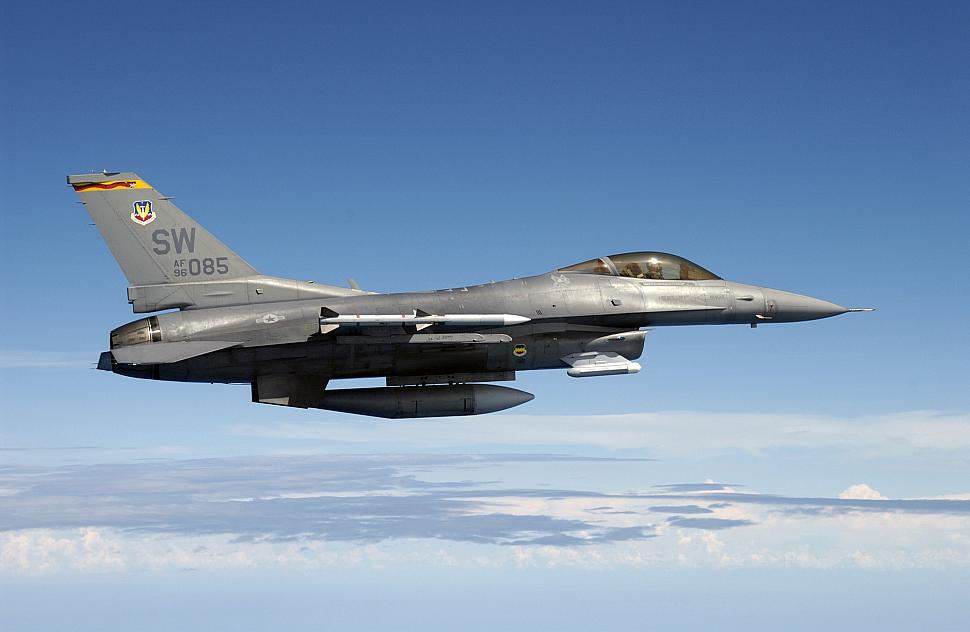
- 96-0085, the F-16 involved in the collision, photographed in 2003
- Type: General Dynamics F-16C Fighting Falcon
- Operator: United States Air Force
- Registration: 96-0085
- Flight origin: Shaw AFB, South Carolina, US
- Destination: Joint Base Charleston, South Carolina, US
- Occupants: 1
- Crew: 1
- Fatalities: 0
- Survivors: 1

Second aircraft
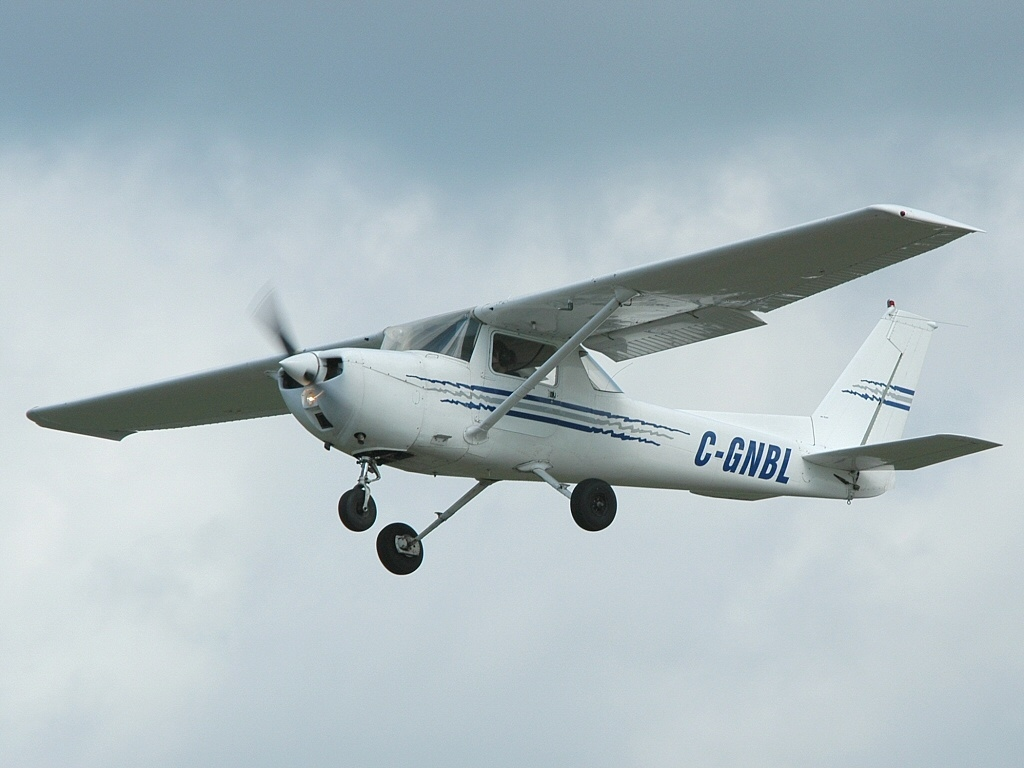
- A Cessna 150M similar to the aircraft involved
- Type: Cessna 150M
- Registration: N3601V
- Flight origin: Berkeley County Airport, South Carolina, US
- Destination: Myrtle Beach International Airport, South Carolina, US
- Occupants: 2
- Passengers: 1
- Crew: 1
- Fatalities: 2
- Survivors: 0

On July 7, 2015, an F-16 fighter jet operated by the United States Air Force collided in-flight with a private Cessna 150 single-engine light aircraft over Moncks Corner, South Carolina, United States. Both occupants of the Cessna were killed; the pilot of the F-16 ejected safely.

The subsequent investigation found that the local air traffic control unit had failed to ensure adequate separation between the two aircraft.

== Collision ==
At about 11:00 AM on July 7, 2015, the F-16 and Cessna 150 collided over Moncks Corner, South Carolina, about 30 miles (48 km) north of Charleston. Witnesses state that the Cessna was climbing when the F-16 hit it broadside. The Cessna (N3601V) was climbing out of the Berkeley County Airport under visual flight rules and was not in communication with FAA air traffic control. The F-16 was on an ATC-assigned heading of 260 degrees and issued a descent to maintain 1,600 feet for an ILS approach to runway 15 at Joint Base Charleston (CHS).

At 11:00:16, the CHS approach controller advised the F-16 pilot of "traffic 12 o'clock, 2 miles, opposite direction, 1,200 [feet altitude] indicated, type unknown." At 11:00:24, the F-16 pilot responded that he was "looking" for the traffic. At 11:00:26, the controller advised the F-16 pilot to "turn left heading 180 if you don't have that traffic in sight." At 11:00:30, the pilot asked, "Confirm 2 miles?" At 11:00:33, the controller stated, "If you don't have that traffic in sight turn left heading 180 immediately." Over the next 18 seconds, the radar-derived ground track of the F-16 began turning southerly toward the designated heading.

At 11:00:49, the radar target of the F-16 was 1/2 nautical mile (1 mi; 1 km) northeast of the Cessna, at an altitude of 1,500 feet (457 m), and was on an approximate track of 215 degrees. At that time, the Cessna reported an altitude of 1,400 feet (427 m) and was established on an approximate ground track of 110 degrees. The two aircraft collided at an approximate altitude of 1,450 feet (442 m).

The F-16 flew for a further three minutes before the pilot transmitted a mayday call. He then ejected safely. Both aircraft crashed in Lewisfield Plantation. Both occupants of the Cessna 150 were killed. The pilot of the F-16 was on an instrument training mission. Its destination was Joint Base Charleston. The Cessna was reported to be on a flight from Berkeley County Airport to Myrtle Beach.

== Aircraft ==
The first aircraft was a General Dynamics F-16C Fighting Falcon registered 96-0085. It was based at Shaw Air Force Base, South Carolina, and was operated by the 20th Fighter Wing of the United States Air Force.

The second aircraft involved was a privately owned Cessna 150M registered N3601V.

== Investigation ==
The National Transportation Safety Board conducted the investigation into the accident. The cause of the collision was found to be air traffic control errors in failing to provide an appropriate conflict resolution between the two aircraft. The Federal Aviation Administration also opened an investigation.
