= CQW =

CQW may refer to:

- Cheraw Municipal Airport (FAA LID: CQW), a public use airport in Chesterfield County, South Carolina, United States
- Chongqing Xiannüshan Airport (IATA: CQW), an airport that serves Wulong District, Chongqing, China
