= KSMS =

KSMS may refer to:

- KSMS-FM, a radio station (90.5 FM) licensed to Point Lookout, Missouri, United States
- KSMS-TV, a television station (channel 67) licensed to Monterey, California, United States
- Sumter Airport (ICAO code KSMS)
