= KLKR =

KLKR may refer to:

- KLKR (FM), a radio station (89.3 FM) licensed to serve Elko, Nevada, United States
- Lancaster County Airport (ICAO code KLKR)
