= HCW =

HCW may refer to:

- Cheraw Municipal Airport, South Carolina, US
- Hartford College for Women, a former college affiliated with the University of Hartford
- Holby City woman, an informal UK voter demographic
- Hull–Chelsea–Wakefield Railway, Quebec, Canada
- Healthcare worker
