= Ridgeland Airport =

Airport in South Carolina, US

Ridgeland Airport Jasper County Airport
- IATA: none; ICAO: none; FAA LID: 3J1

Summary
- Airport type: Public
- Owner: County of Jasper
- Serves: Ridgeland, South Carolina
- Elevation AMSL: 79 ft / 24 m
- Coordinates: 32°29′36″N 080°59′30″W
- Website: http://www.jaspercountysc.org/secondary.aspx?pageID=111
- Interactive map of Ridgeland Airport

Runways
Direction	Length		Surface
Direction	ft	m	Surface
3/21	2,692	914	Asphalt

Statistics (2012)
- Aircraft operations: 12,000
- Based aircraft: 46
- Source: South Carolina Aeronautics Commission

Ridgeland Airport (FAA LID: 3J1) is a county-owned public-use airport in Jasper County, South Carolina, United States. The airport is located one nautical mile (2 km) northwest of downtown Ridgeland. It is also known as Jasper County Airport as it serves the entirety of Jasper County. The airport began operations in 1943 as a private airfield for aviation enthusiasts and received state funding in 1960 to construct a paved runway. Several flight instruction schools and clubs utilize the facility on a regular basis.

== Facilities and aircraft ==
Ridgeland Airport covers an area of 82 acres (33 ha) at an elevation of 79 feet (24 m) above mean sea level, among the highest elevations in the Lowcountry. It has one runway designated 3/21 with an asphalt surface measuring 2,692 by 70 feet (821 x 21 m).

== See also ==
- List of airports in South Carolina
