= Spartanburg Downtown Memorial Airport =

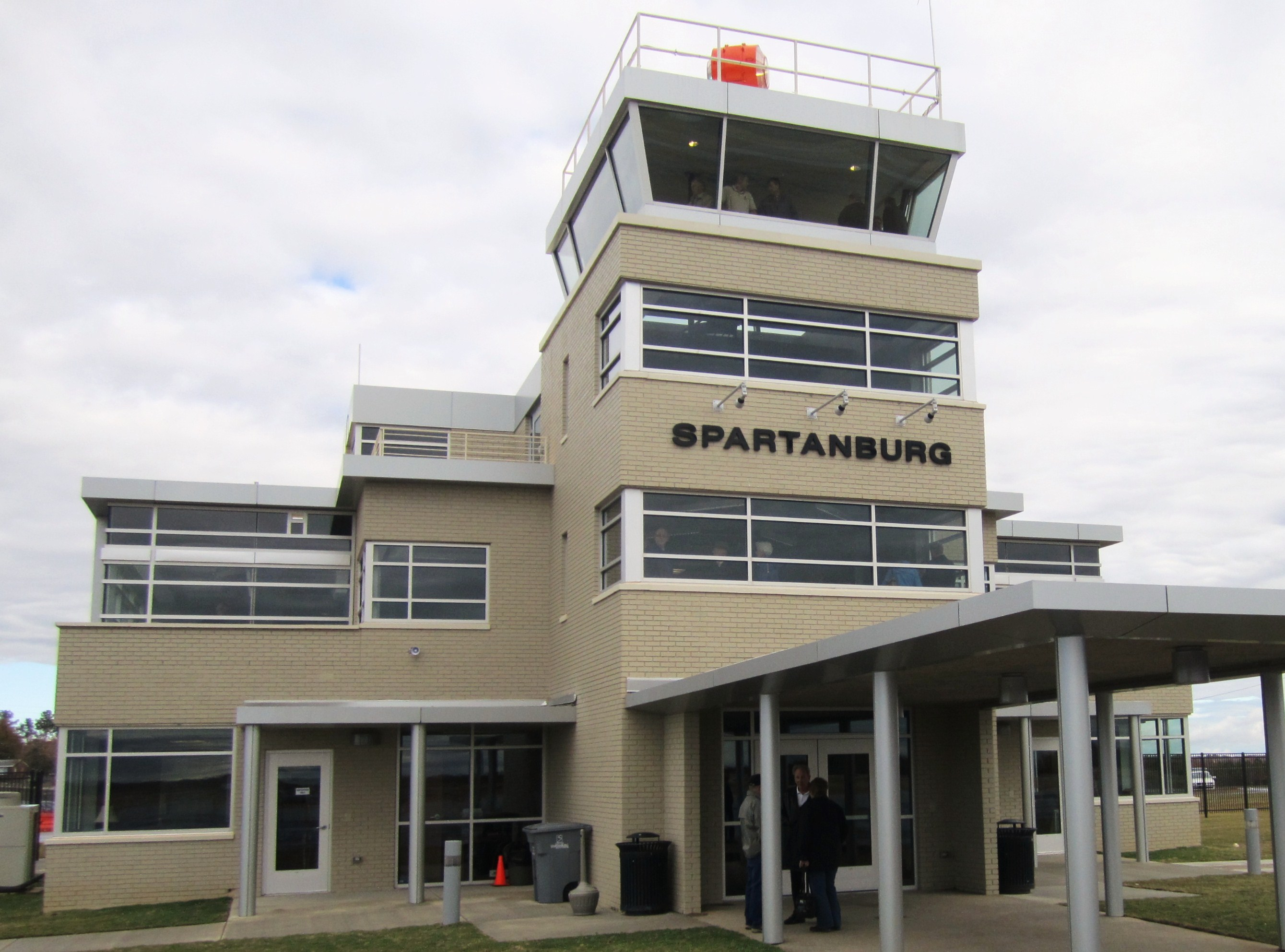
- SPA terminal building
- IATA: SPA; ICAO: KSPA; FAA LID: SPA

Summary
- Airport type: Public
- Owner/Operator: City of Spartanburg
- Location: Spartanburg, South Carolina
- Elevation AMSL: 801 ft / 244.1 m
- Coordinates: 34.9157°N 81.9565°W
- Website: Spartanburg Downtown Memorial Airport
- Interactive map of Spartanburg Downtown Memorial Airport

Runways
Direction	Length		Surface
Direction	ft	m	Surface
5/23	5,852	1,775	Asphalt

The Spartanburg Downtown Memorial Airport (IATA: SPA, ICAO: KSPA, FAA LID: SPA) is a general aviation airport located in the city of Spartanburg, South Carolina. The airport is 3 miles (4.8 km) from downtown Spartanburg, which makes it popular for private and corporate aircraft.

== History ==
South Carolina's first commercial airport was opened in 1927. Famed aviator Charles Lindbergh participated in the grand opening of the airport only months following his historic flight across the Atlantic. Passenger air service commenced that same year but ended in 1962 with the opening of the Greenville-Spartanburg Jetport, later renamed Greenville-Spartanburg International Airport. In April 1957, Eastern scheduled six weekday departures, Southern had four and Delta had three.

During World War II, the airport was a training facility for the United States Army Air Corps and a refueling stop for naval aviators.

An FAA operated air traffic control tower was operational at the airport but closed in 1981 during the PATCO controllers strike.

== Airport and facilities ==
The airport once had three intersecting runways with a parallel taxiway system connecting them to the aircraft parking apron. Runway 4/22 was 5,203 feet (1,586 m) long by 150 feet (46 m) wide, Runway 17/35 was 4,226 feet (1,288 m) long by 150 feet (46 m) wide, and runway 11/29 was 4,403 feet (1,342 m) long by 150 feet (46 m) wide. Today only runway 4/22 remains but was redesignated as runway 5/23 several years ago. Prevailing winds in the area generally favor the use of this runway. Only remnants of the other runways are visible today.

An instrument landing system (ILS) is available for use on runway 5. WAAS approaches are available to runway 5 and runway 23. Runway 5 also has high intensity runway edge lighting (HIRL), visual approach slope indicator lights (VASI), and a medium intensity approach lighting system (MALSR). Other navigational aids nearby are the Spartanburg Vortac (VOR) (7.2 miles northeast) and the Fairmont Non-directional beacon (NDB) (1.6 miles west).

The airport's 1936 terminal building, extensively renovated and expanded in 2011, houses a fixed-base operator (FBO) operated by the City of Spartanburg. The airport also houses two flight schools, Pivotal Aviation and Aero II. Adjacent to the terminal building are several aircraft hangars.

The airport is home to the Spartanburg Composite Squadron of the Civil Air Patrol and the Spartanburg Pilot's Association.

=== Runway expansion and playground ===
A 25-million dollar extension of runway 5/23 began in late 2016 and was completed in 2018. The extension project lengthened the runway to 5,852 feet and added safety areas to both runway ends. The project also included resurfacing the runway and upgrading airport navigation and lighting systems.

Also completed in 2018 was an aviation-themed playground with a viewing platform and a pavilion with restrooms.

Construction began in 2024 to rehabilitate portions of the parallel taxiway to runway 5/23.

== Economic impact ==
The Spartanburg Downtown Memorial Airport contributes $15.4 million to the local economy. It is the third busiest general aviation airport in South Carolina, with almost 69,000 operations yearly. The airport creates 190 aviation-related jobs in the area, with a payroll of more than $5.2 million.

== See also ==
- List of airports in South Carolina
