= Hartsville Regional Airport =

Airport in South Carolina, United States

- IATA: HVS; ICAO: KHVS; FAA LID: HVS

Summary
- Airport type: Public
- Owner: City of Hartsville
- Serves: Hartsville, South Carolina
- Elevation AMSL: 364 ft (111 m)
- Coordinates: 34°24′11″N 080°07′09″W
- Website: www.hartsvillesc.com/...
- Interactive map of Hartsville Regional Airport

Runways
Direction	Length		Surface
Direction	ft	m	Surface
3/21	5,000	1,524	Asphalt

Statistics (2021)
- Aircraft operations (year ending June 16, 2021): 5,300
- Based aircraft: 14
- Sources: FAA, SC Aeronautics

Hartsville Regional Airport (IATA: HVS, ICAO: KHVS, FAA LID: HVS) is a city-owned public-use airport located three nautical miles (6 km) northwest of the central business district of Hartsville, a city in Darlington County, South Carolina, United States.

== Facilities and aircraft ==
Hartsville Regional Airport covers an area of 281 acres (114 ha) at an elevation of 364 feet (111 m) above mean sea level. It has one runway designated 3/21 with an asphalt surface measuring 5,000 by 75 feet (1,524 x 23 m).

For the 12-month period ending June 16, 2021, the airport had 5,300 aircraft operations, an average of 102 per week: 91% general aviation, 6% military, and 4% air taxi. At that time there were 14 aircraft based at this airport: 13 single-engine and 1 multi-engine.

== See also ==
- List of airports in South Carolina
