= Douglas C-54 Skymaster =

Military transport aircraft derived from DC-4

C-54 Skymaster
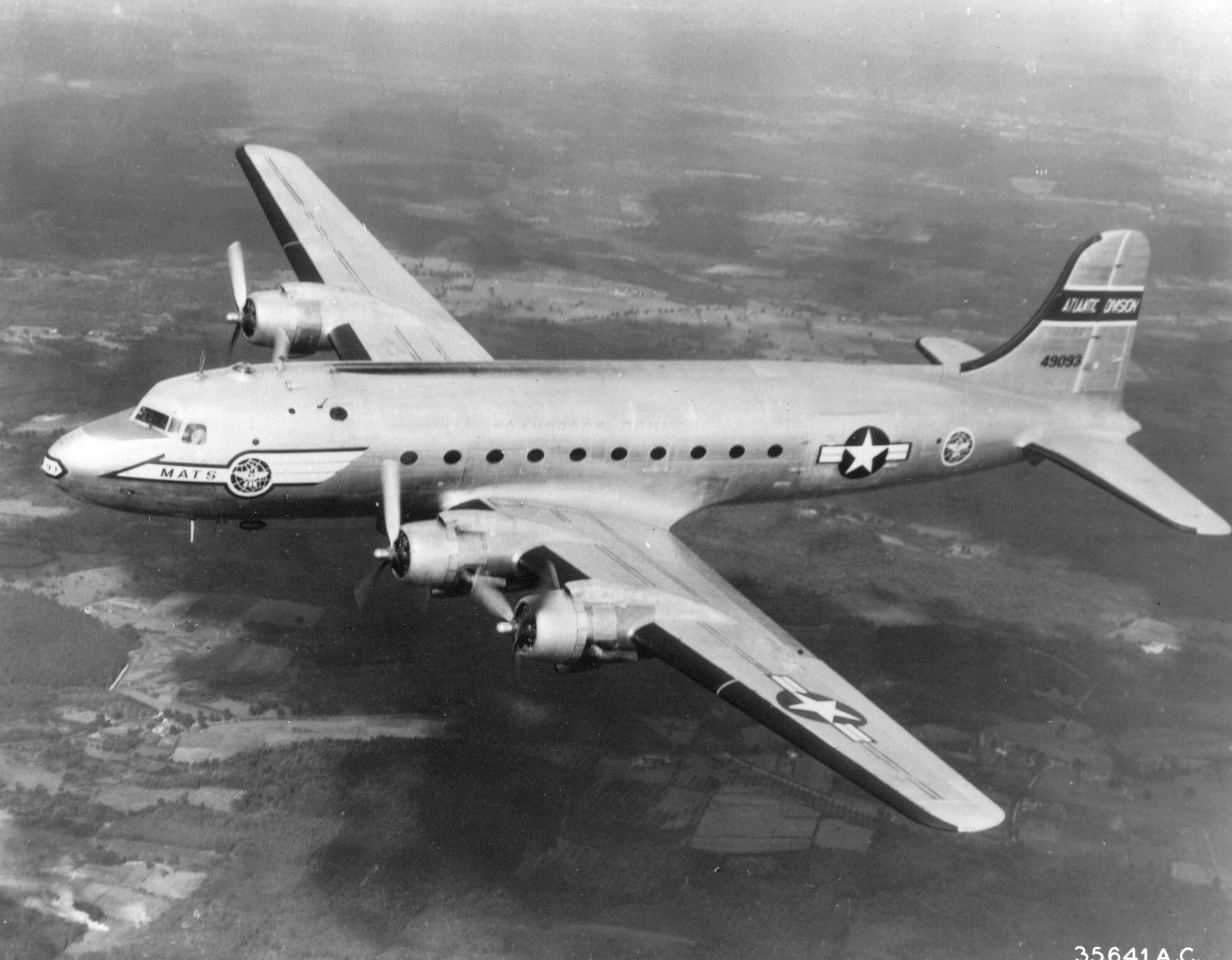

General information
- Type: Military transport aircraft
- National origin: United States
- Manufacturer: Douglas Aircraft Company
- Primary users: United States Army Air Forces United States Navy; United States Air Force
- Number built: 1,170

History
- Manufactured: 1942–1947
- Introduction date: 1942
- First flight: 14 February 1942
- Retired: 1975
- Developed from: Douglas DC-4

The Douglas C-54 Skymaster is a four-engined transport aircraft used by the United States Army Air Forces in World War II and the Korean War. Like the Douglas C-47 Skytrain derived from the DC-3, the C-54 Skymaster was derived from a civilian airliner, the Douglas DC-4. Besides transport of cargo, the C-54 also carried presidents, prime ministers, and military staff. Dozens of variants of the C-54 were employed in a wide variety of non-combat roles such as air-sea rescue, scientific and military research, and missile tracking and recovery. During the Berlin Airlift it hauled coal and food supplies to West Berlin. After the Korean War it continued to be used for military and civilian uses by more than 30 countries. It was one of the first aircraft to carry the president of the United States, the first being Franklin D. Roosevelt during World War II.

== Design and development ==
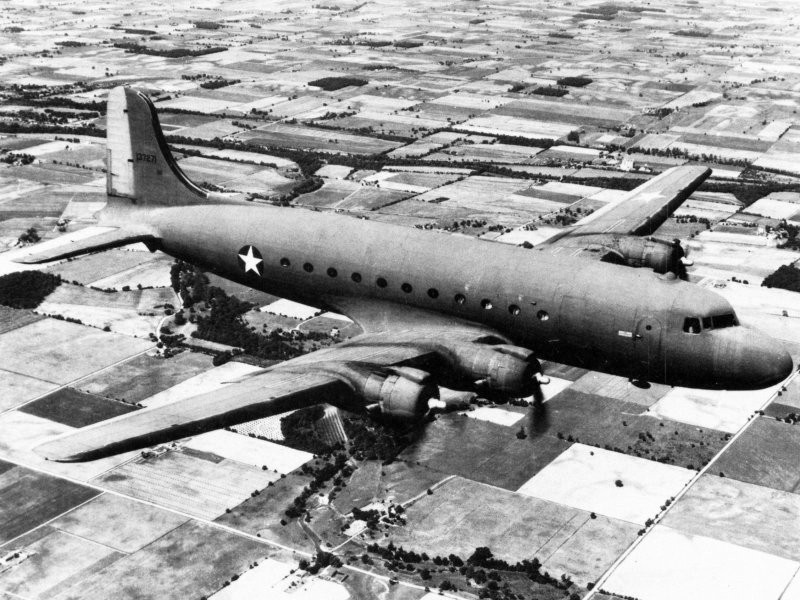
A USAAF Douglas C-54 (s/n 41-37271), circa 1943

With the looming entry of the United States into World War II, in June 1941 the War Department took over the provision orders for the airlines for the Douglas DC-4 and allocated them to the United States Army Air Forces with the designation C-54 Skymaster. (Note: Sources differ on the date of the takeover. Polmar gives 28 June 1941, while Francillon 1979, p. 326, and Pearcy 1995, pp. 107–108, place it after the attack on Pearl Harbor.) The first, a C-54, flew from Clover Field in Santa Monica, California on 14 February 1942. (Note: Some sources give 26 March 1942 for the first flight, among them Polmar, Swanborough and Bowers 1963, p. 242, and a photo caption in Pearcy 1995, p. 108. Francillon 1979, p. 327, records the first delivery on 20 March 1942.)

To meet military requirements, the first civil production aircraft had four additional auxiliary fuel tanks in the main cabin, which reduced the number of passenger seats to 26. The following batch of aircraft, designated C-54A, were built with a stronger floor and a cargo door with a hoist and winch. The first C-54A became available in February 1943. The C-54B, introduced in 1944, had integral fuel tanks in the outer wings, allowing two of the cabin tanks to be removed. The cabin also had fittings for stretchers. The C-54C, a hybrid for Presidential use, had a C-54A fuselage and C-54B wings with built in tanks for greater fuel capacity.

The most common variant was the C-54D. Based on the C-54B, it was fitted with R-2000-11 engines. With the C-54E, the last two cabin fuel tanks were moved to the wings and the cabin could be rapidly converted between freight and 44 passenger seats.

Aircraft transferred to the United States Navy were designated Douglas R5D. With the introduction of the Tri-Service aircraft designation system in 1962, all surviving R5Ds were re-designated C-54.

== Operational history ==
C-54s began service with the USAAF in 1942, carrying up to 26 passengers, later versions carrying up to 50 passengers. The C-54 was one of the most commonly used long-range transports by the U.S. armed forces in World War II. Of the C-54s produced, 515 were manufactured in Santa Monica, California and 655 were manufactured at Orchard Place/Douglas Field, in unincorporated Cook County, Illinois, near Chicago (later the site of O'Hare International Airport).

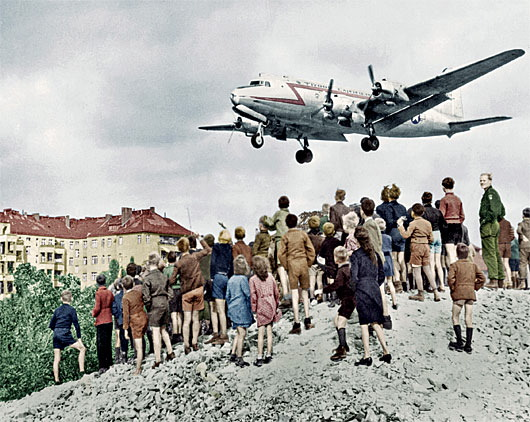
A C-54 landing at Tempelhof airport during the Berlin Airlift

During World War II, the C-54 was used by Franklin D. Roosevelt, Douglas MacArthur, and Winston Churchill. The American delegates to the Casablanca Conference used the Skymaster. The C-54 was also used by the Royal Air Force, the French Air Force, and the armed forces of at least 12 other nations.

President Harry S. Truman signed the National Security Act of 1947, which created the U.S. Air Force, on board Sacred Cow, the Presidential VC-54C which is preserved at the National Museum of the United States Air Force near Dayton, Ohio. More than 300 C-54s and R5Ds formed the backbone of the US contribution to the Berlin Airlift in 1948. They also served as the main airlift during the Korean War. After the Korean War, the C-54 was replaced by the Douglas C-124 Globemaster II, but continued to be used by the U.S. Air Force until 1972. The last active C-54 Skymaster in U.S. Navy service (C-54Q, BuNo 56501, of the Navy Test Pilot School, NAS Patuxent River) was retired on 2 April 1974.

In late 1945, several hundred C-54s were surplus to U.S. military requirements and these were converted for civil airline operation, many by Douglas Aircraft at its aircraft plants. The aircraft were sold to airlines around the world. By January 1946, Pan American Airways was operating their Skymasters on transatlantic scheduled services to Europe and beyond. Trans-Pacific schedules from San Francisco to Auckland began on 6 June 1946. After disposal by the U.S. Air Force and U.S. Navy, many C-54s were modified for use in civilian firefighting and air tanker roles. This included fitting tanks inside and under the fuselage and the fitting of dumping and spraying equipment on the wing trailing edges. C-54s continued in this role until the late 1990s.

== Variants ==
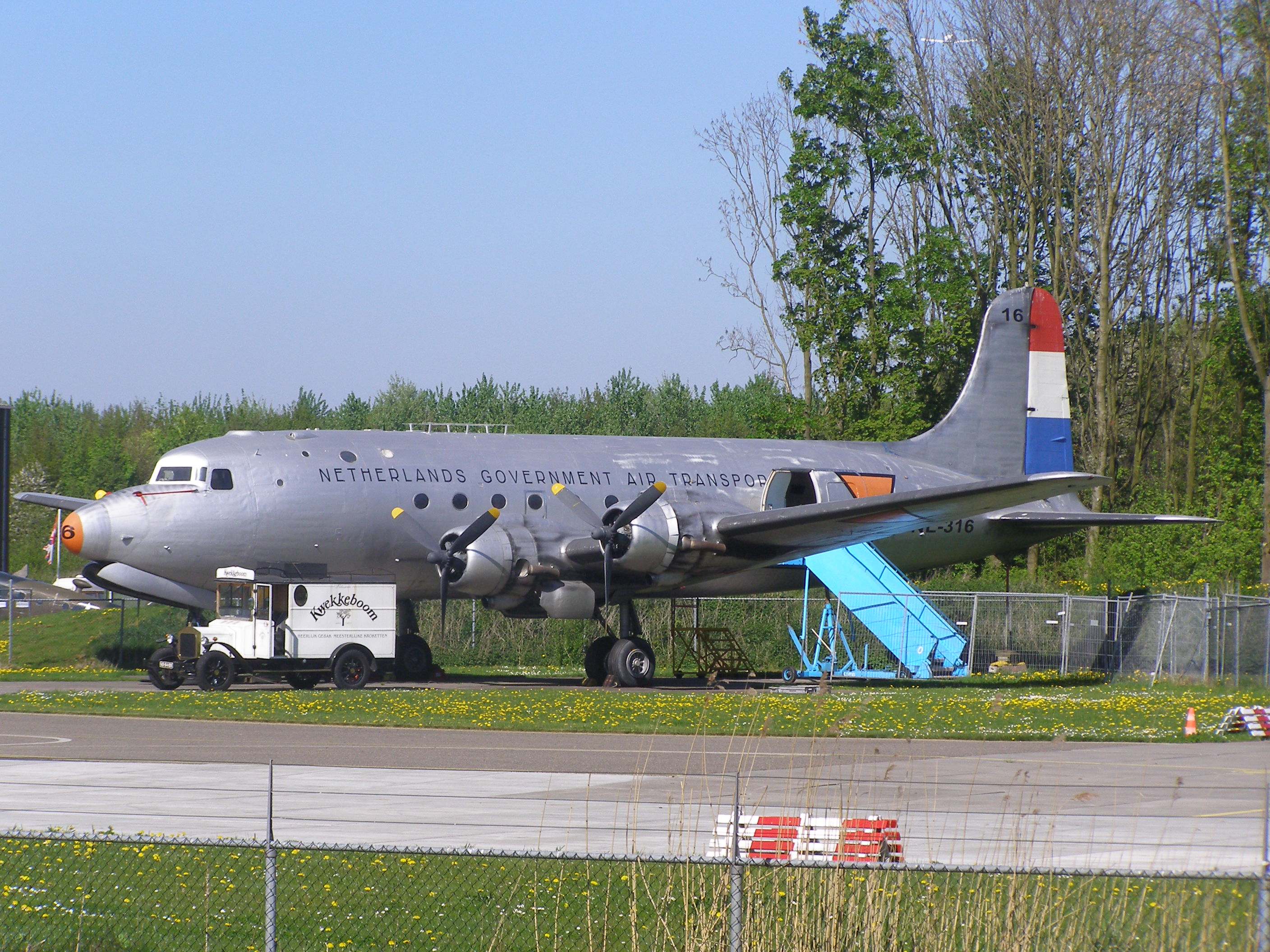
Netherlands Government Air Transport C-54A on display at the Aviodrome

C-54
First production variant adapted from DC-4, 24 built.
C-54A
First military version with strengthened airframe, increased fuel capacity, provision for passengers or cargo, Navy equivalent R5D-1, 252 built.
C-54B
Increased fuel capacity in the wing, One was used by Winston Churchill, 220 built.
C-54D
Same as C-54B but with R-2000-11 engines, 380 built.
C-54E
Further revision to fuel tanks and provision for rapid conversion from passenger to cargo, 125 built.
C-54G
Same as C-54E but with different version of the R-2000 engine. 400 ordered, of which 162 were completed and the remainder were cancelled at the end of WW2.

== Accidents and incidents ==
- On 9 July 1943, USAAF C-54A 41-37271 crashed in a mid-air collision with a C-40A at Wright Field, Ohio. While para-dropping a Studebaker T-24 Weasel which was slung under the fuselage, the C-54 collided with the C-40A photographic chase plane. Three of the five crew of the C-54A and all five aboard the C-40A were killed.
- On 3 October 1946, an American Overseas Airlines (AOA) Douglas C-54 aircraft named Flagship New England crashed soon after take-off from Stephenville, Newfoundland, killing all 39 people on board. It was, at the time, the deadliest aircraft crash on Newfoundland soil.
- On 3 July 1947, US Army Air Forces C-54G 45-519 crashed in the Atlantic 294 miles off Florida after a loss of control caused by turbulence from a storm, killing the six crew.

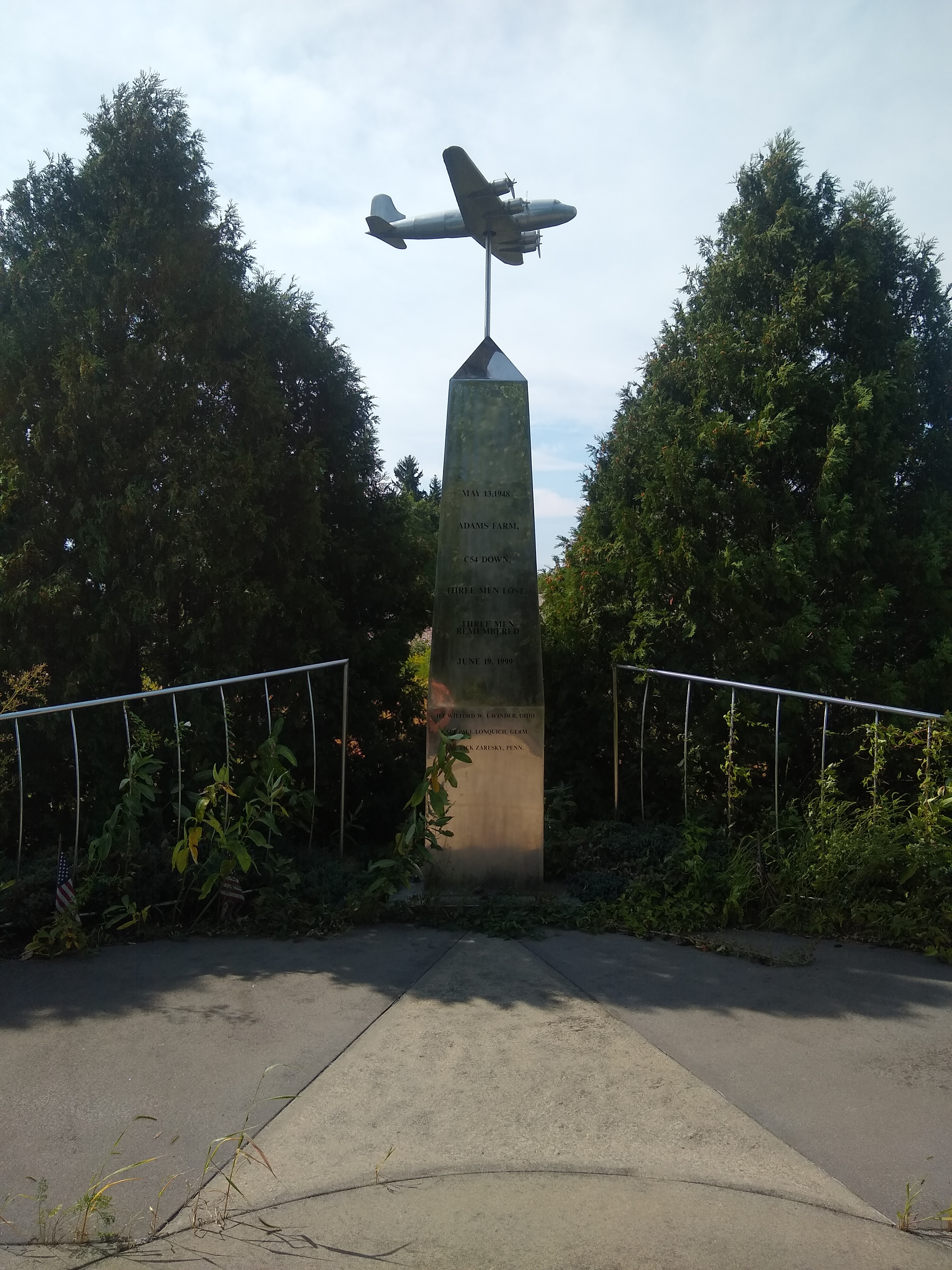
Monument dedicated to the victims of the 1948 crash

- On 14 May 1948, an army transport plane flying through a rainstorm crashed in Northampton, Massachusetts, killing the three crew members aboard.
- On 26 January 1950, a C-54D operated by the United States Air Force disappeared during a flight between Anchorage-Elmendorf Air Force Base (Alaska) and Great Falls Air Force Base (Montana) with a crew of eight and 36 passengers (34 service personnel and two civilians). Its last radio call was over Snag, Yukon. No trace of the aircraft or its occupants has ever been found.

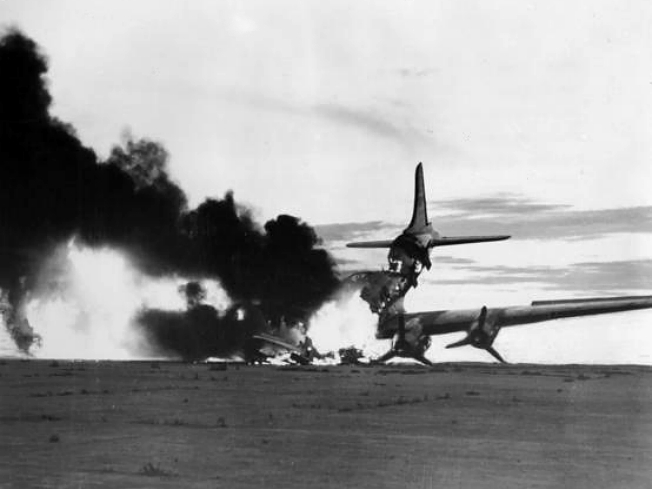
A USAF C-54 destroyed by North Korean fighters, 1950

- On 25 June 1950, North Korea invaded South Korea. North Korean fighter aircraft attacked airfields at Kimpo and Seoul, the South Korean capital, destroying one USAF C-54 on the ground at Kimpo Air Base.
- On 19 September 1950, a U.S. Navy C-54 en route to Korea crashed into the sea approximately one minute after takeoff from Kwajalein Atoll, Marshall Islands. The aircraft had 26 personnel aboard including eleven nurses. There were no survivors.
- On 31 January 1951, the C-54D with tail number 282 of the Portuguese Military Aeronautics, operated by the Search and Rescue Squadron of the Lajes Air Base, Azores, flying from the Lisbon Airport back to its base, crashed in the Atlantic, when approaching Lajes. All of the 14 people on board (two pilots, nine mechanics and three other military personnel) were killed.
- On 29 April 1952, an Air France Douglas C-54A (registration F-BELI) operating a scheduled service from Frankfurt Rhein-Main Airport to Berlin Tempelhof Airport came under sustained attack from two Soviet MiG-15 fighters while passing through one of the Allied air corridors over East Germany. Although the attack had severely damaged the aircraft, necessitating the shutdown of engines number three and four, the pilot in command of the aircraft managed to carry out a safe emergency landing at Tempelhof Airport. A subsequent inspection of the aircraft's damage revealed that it had been hit by 89 shots fired from the Soviet MiGs. There were no fatalities among the 17 occupants (six crew, 11 passengers) despite the severity of the attack. The Soviet military authorities defended this attack on an unarmed civilian aircraft by claiming the Air France plane was outside the air corridor at the time of attack.
- On 23 July 1954, a Douglas C-54 Skymaster civilian airliner, registration VR-HEU, operated by Cathay Pacific Airways, en route from Bangkok to Hong Kong, was shot and severely damaged by Chinese PLAAF Lavochkin La-11 fighters off the coast of Hainan Island. The pilot was able to ditch the aircraft, and whilst ten people on board were killed as a result of the attack, another nine were rescued by a USAF Grumman HU-16 Albatross Air-Sea Rescue plane.
- On 17 November 1955, United States Air Force C-54 Flight 9068 crashed into the south eastern flank of 11,916 foot Mount Charleston at approximately the 11,300 foot elevation. The crash occurred at roughly 8:30am during a high wind snowstorm with limited visibility approximately 35 miles northwest of Las Vegas. The airplane was en route to a classified destination referred to as "Watertown" (now known as the Area 51 test site in Nevada) from Burbank, California. There were 14 passengers and air crew on board from the U.S. Air Force, the CIA, and several government contractors who were working on the top secret U-2 spy plane project. There were no survivors and the crash investigation remained classified until 1998.
- On 11 December 1955, the C-54 of the United States Air Force's 1700th Air Transport Group, based at Kelly Field, San Antonio, Tex. The transport crashed in the Gomor district near the border, between French and Spanish Morocco. Flying from Wheelus Field in Tripoli to Casablanca, it was believed en route to the United States. Eight United States airmen died when their plane exploded in the rugged Riff Mountains of North Africa.
- On 28 March 1964, a C-54A disappeared over the Pacific (about 1120 km west of San Francisco—last reported position: 29.33°N 135.00°W) on an executive passenger flight from Honolulu International Airport, Hawaii to Los Angeles International Airport, California. The pilot reported a fire in No. 2 engine, which might make it necessary to ditch. Nothing more was heard from the aircraft, nor was any trace of it found despite an extensive search. Three crew and six passengers died in the accident.

== Aircraft on display ==
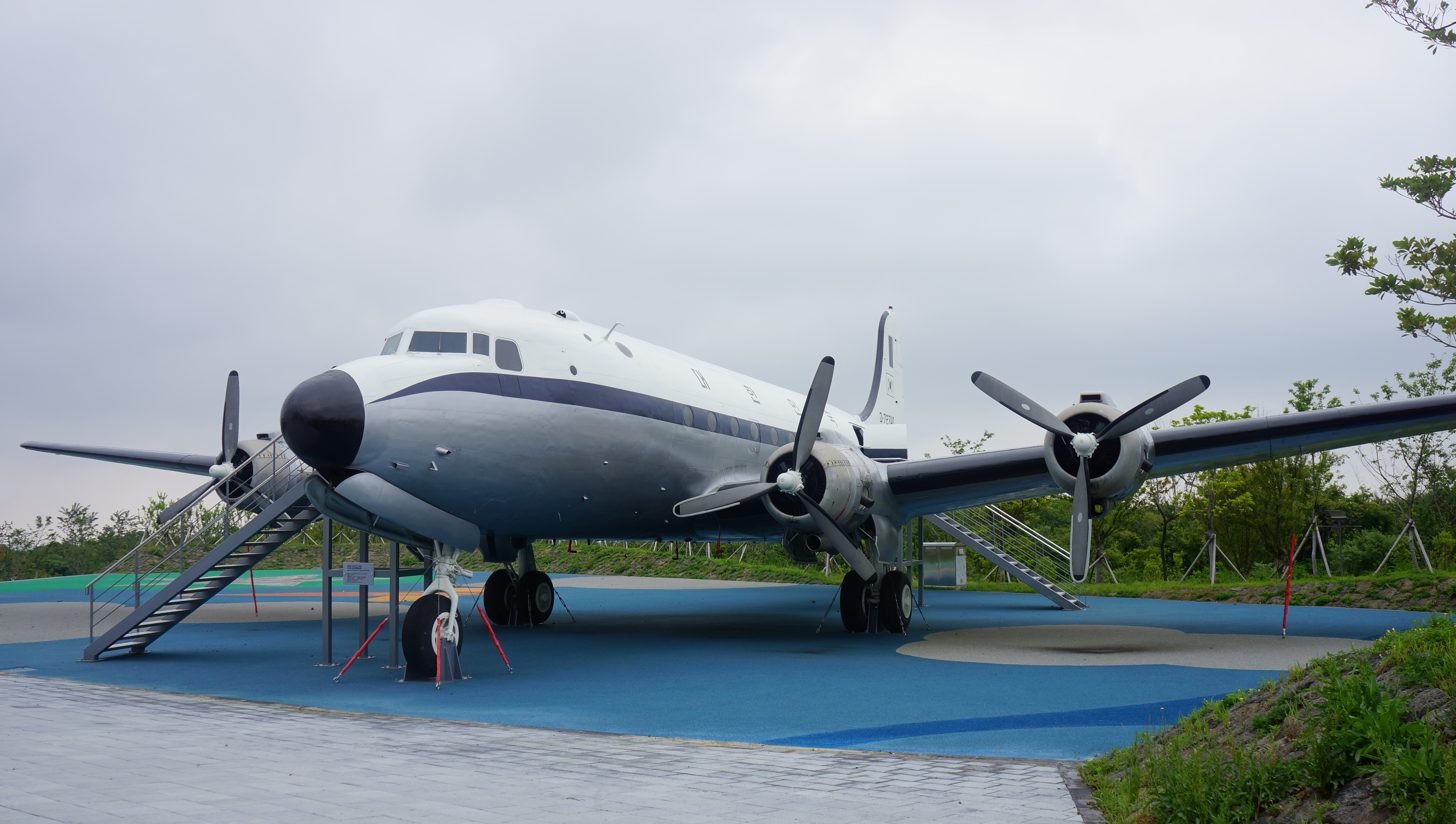
C-54D at the Jeju Aerospace Museum

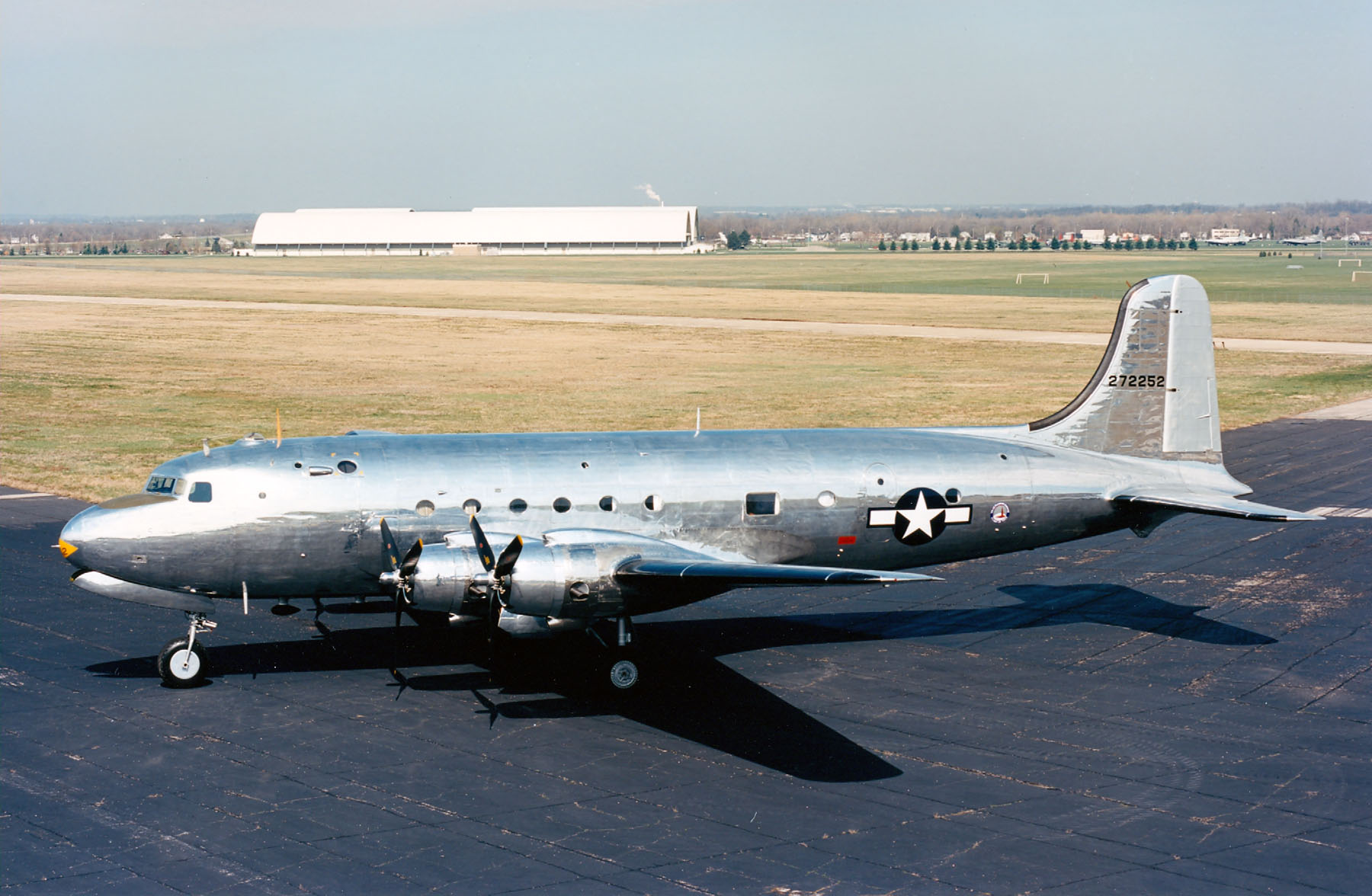
VC-54C at the National Museum of the United States Air Force

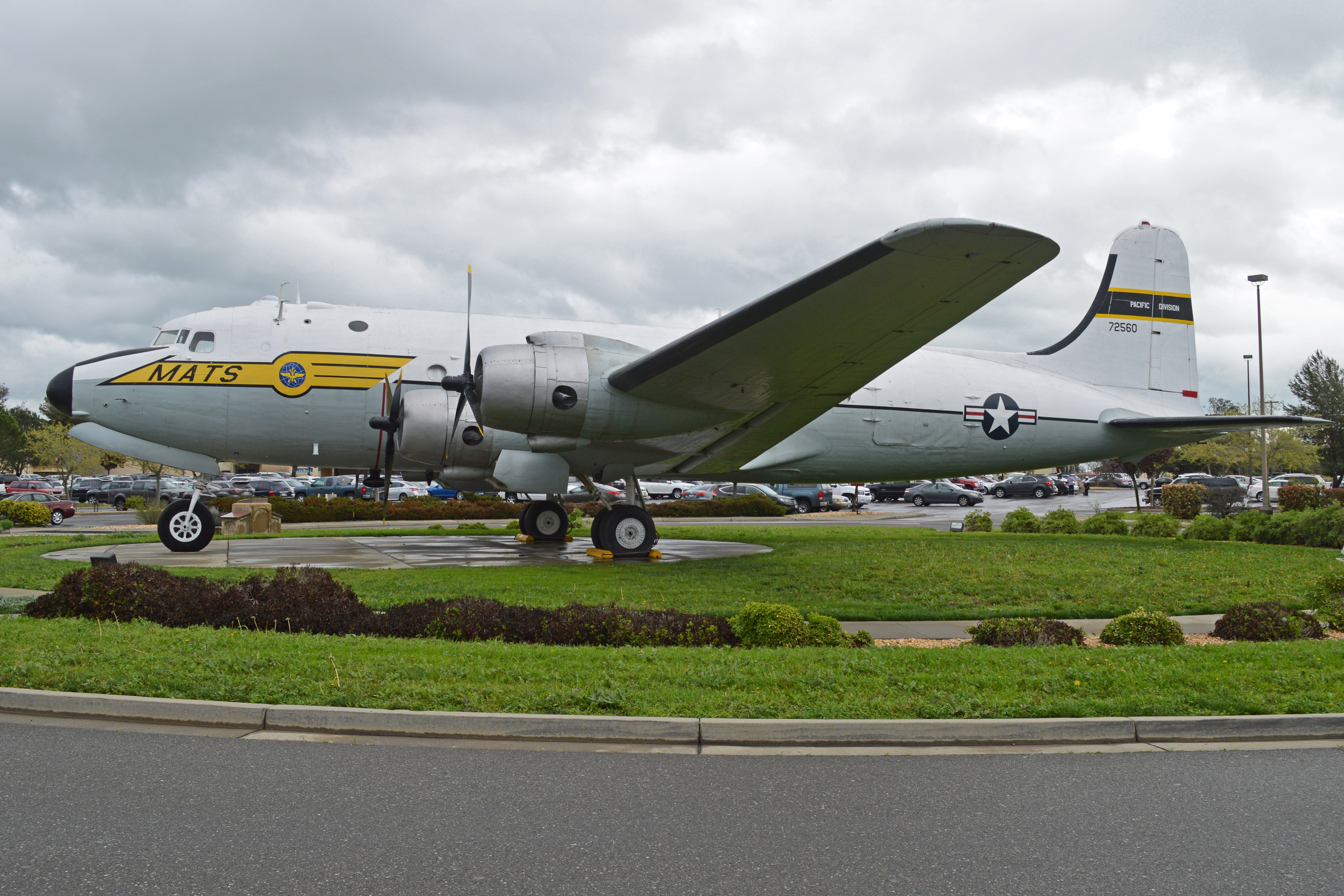
R5D-3 near the Travis Air Force Base Aviation Museum

=== Germany ===
- 44-9063 – C-54G on static display at Frankfurt Airport in Frankfurt, Hesse.
- 45-0557 – C-54G on static display at Tempelhof Airport with the Deutsches Technik Museum in Berlin.

=== Netherlands ===
- 42-107469 – C-54A on static display at the Aviodrome in Lelystad.

=== Saudi Arabia ===
- 450 – C-54A on static display at the Royal Saudi Air Force Museum in Riyadh.

=== South Korea ===
- 0-50582 – C-54E on static display at the KAI Aerospace Museum in Sacheon.
- 0-72740 – C-54D on static display at the Jeju Aerospace Museum in Jeju.

=== Turkey ===
- 10683 – C-54D on static display at the Istanbul Aviation Museum in Istanbul.

=== United States ===
- 50874 – R5D-3 on static display at the Aerospace Museum of California in McClellan, California.
- 56505 – C-54Q on static display at the Travis Air Force Base Aviation Museum in Fairfield, California.
- 56506 – C-54Q on static display at the Western Sky Aviation Warbird Museum in St. George, Utah.
- 56511 – VC-54S on static display at the South Dakota Air and Space Museum in Box Elder, South Dakota.
- 56514 – R5D-3 on static display at the March Field Air Museum in Riverside, California.
- 90407 – R5D-4 on static display at Castle Air Museum in Atwater, California.
- 90411 – C-54T on static display at Historic Wendover Airfield in Wendover, Utah.
- 42-72488 – C-54D on static display at the Pima Air & Space Museum in Tucson, Arizona.
- 42-72724 – C-54D on static display at the Strategic Air Command & Aerospace Museum in Ashland, Nebraska.
- 42-107451 – VC-54C on static display at the National Museum of the United States Air Force in Dayton, Ohio.
- 44-9030 – C-54M on static display at the Air Mobility Command Museum in Dover, Delaware.
- 45-0502 – C-45G on static display at the Hill Aerospace Museum in Roy, Utah.
- 45-0579 – C-54G on static display at the Museum of Aviation in Warner Robins, Georgia.

=== Venezuela ===
- 7-AT-1 – C-54A on static display at the Aeronautics Museum of Maracay in Maracay, Aragua.

== Specifications (C-54G-DO) ==
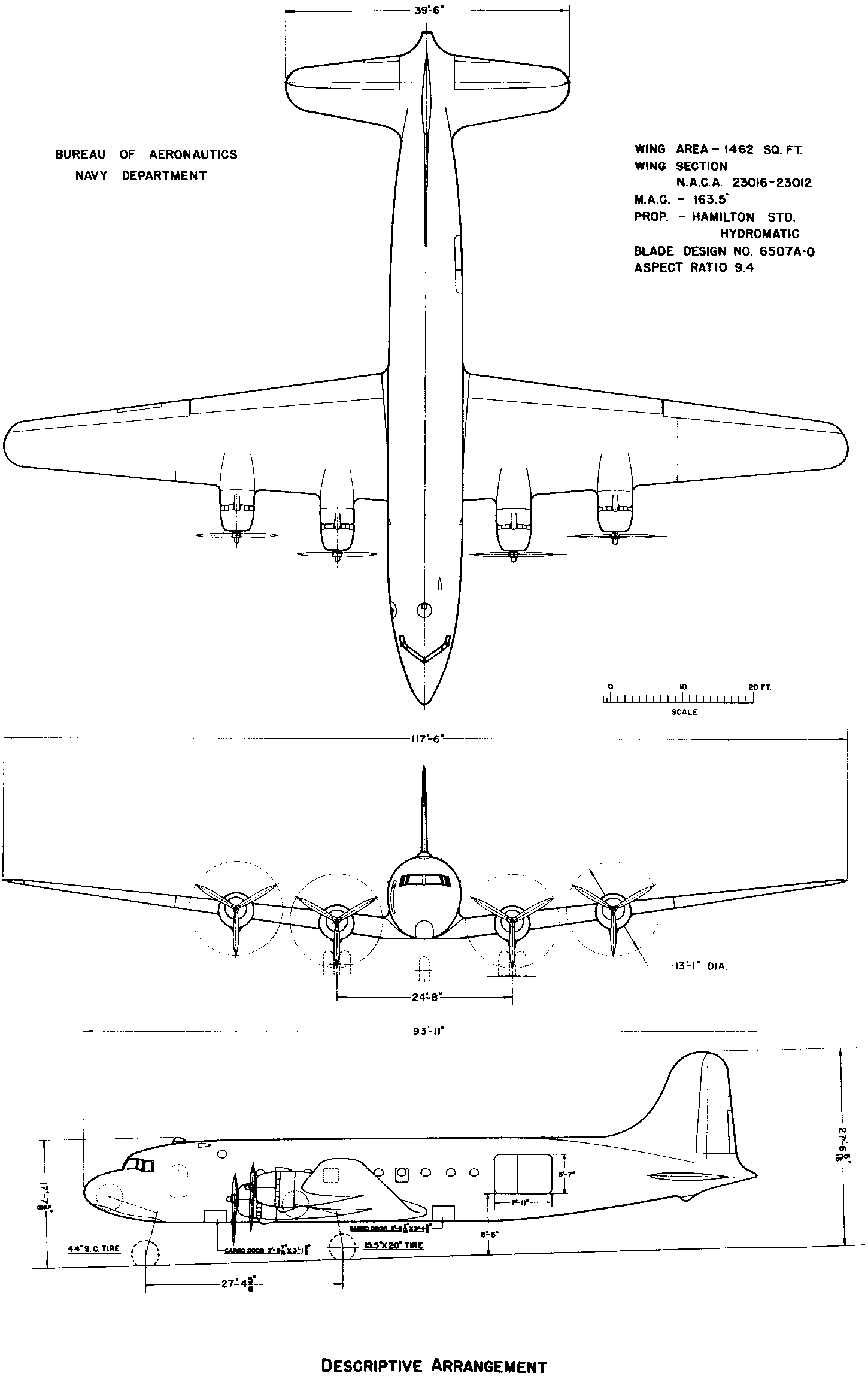
Three-view line drawing of the Douglas R5D-2 Skymaster

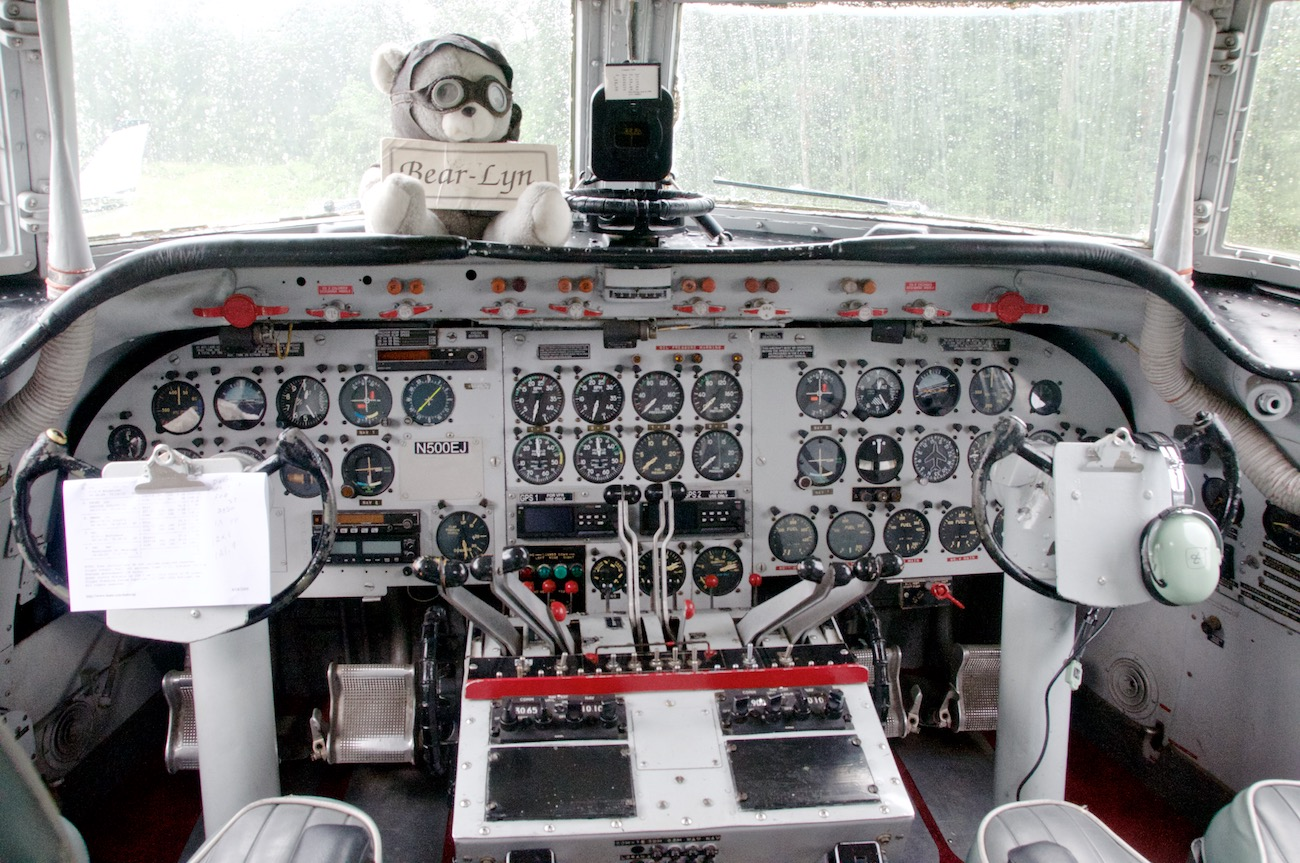
Cockpit of a restored C-54 Skymaster, N500EJ, Spirit of Freedom of the Berlin Airlift Historical Foundation

Data from McDonnell Douglas aircraft since 1920 : Volume I

General characteristics

- Crew: four
- Capacity: 50 troops / 32,500 lb (14,700 kg) cargo
- Length: 93 ft 10 in (28.60 m)
- Wingspan: 117 ft 6 in (35.81 m)
- Height: 27 ft 6 in (8.38 m)
- Wing area: 1,460 sq ft (136 m^{2})
- Airfoil: root: NACA 23016; tip: NACA 23012
- Empty weight: 38,930 lb (17,658 kg)
- Gross weight: 62,000 lb (28,123 kg)
- Max takeoff weight: 73,000 lb (33,112 kg)
- Fuel capacity: 2,868 US gal (2,388 imp gal; 10,860 L) normal fuel load; 3,592 US gal (2,991 imp gal; 13,600 L) with auxiliary fuel
- Powerplant: 4 × Pratt & Whitney R-2000-9 Twin Wasp 14-cylinder air-cooled radial piston engines:
  - 1,450 hp (1,080 kW) takeoff rating
  - 1,100 hp (820 kW) normal rating at 7,500 ft (2,300 m)
- Propellers: 3-bladed constant-speed fully-feathering propellers

Performance

- Maximum speed: 275 mph (443 km/h, 239 kn) at 20,000 ft (6,100 m)
- Cruise speed: 190 mph (310 km/h, 170 kn) at 10,000 ft (3,000 m)
- Range: 4,000 mi (6,400 km, 3,500 nmi) with 4,000 lb (1,800 kg) payload
- Service ceiling: 22,300 ft (6,800 m)
- Time to altitude: 10,000 ft (3,000 m) in 14 minutes 36 seconds
- Wing loading: 42.5 lb/sq ft (208 kg/m^{2})
- Power/mass: 0.0935 hp/lb (0.1537 kW/kg)

== Notable appearances in media ==
A C-54, registration C-FIQM (Buffalo 5-721 (tail 57)), was used as a substitute Lancaster bomber due to its similar top speed and maximum payload, for a recreation of Operation Chastise with its bouncing bomb. It was filmed in the UK documentary Dambusters: Building the Bouncing Bomb, Canadian documentary Dambusters Fly Again, Nova season 39 episode "Bombing Hitler's Dams", and Ice Pilots NWT season 3 episode 2 "Dambusters". The 1950 drama, "The Big Lift" features C-54s flying the Berlin Airlift.

== See also ==
Related development

- Aviation Traders Carvair
- Canadair North Star
- Douglas DC-4
- Douglas DC-6
- Douglas DC-7

Aircraft of comparable role, configuration, and era

- Avro York
- Boeing 307 Stratoliner
- Lockheed Constellation
- Lockheed L-049 Constellation

Related lists

- List of aircraft
- List of aircraft of World War II
- List of civil aircraft
- List of military aircraft of the United States
- List of United States Navy aircraft designations (pre-1962)
