= List of airports in South Carolina =

This is a list of airports in South Carolina (a U.S. state), grouped by type and sorted by location. It contains all public-use and military airports in the state. Some private-use and former airports may be included where notable, such as airports that were previously public-use, those with commercial enplanements recorded by the FAA or airports assigned an IATA airport code.

== Airports ==
This list contains the following information:

- **City served** – The city generally associated with the airport, as per the airport's master record with the Federal Aviation Administration. This is not always the actual location since some airports are located in smaller towns outside of the city they serve. It is not meant to be a complete list of cities served, which can be found in or added to each airport's Wikipedia article.
- **FAA** – The location identifier assigned by the Federal Aviation Administration (FAA). These are linked to each airport's page at the South Carolina Aeronautics Commission.
- **IATA** – The airport code assigned by the International Air Transport Association (IATA). Those that do not match the FAA code are shown in bold.
- **ICAO** – The location indicator assigned by the International Civil Aviation Organization (ICAO).
- **Airport name** – The official airport name. Those shown in **bold** indicate the airport has scheduled passenger service on commercial airlines.
- **Role** – One of four FAA airport categories, as per the 2021–2025 National Plan of Integrated Airport Systems (NPIAS) report released September 2020:
  - P-s: Commercial service – primary are publicly owned airports that receive scheduled passenger service and have more than 10,000 passenger boardings (enplanements) each year. Each primary airport is sub-classified by the FAA as one of the following four "hub" types (s):
    - L: Large hub that accounts for at least 1% of total U.S. passenger enplanements.
    - M: Medium hub that accounts for between 0.25% and 1% of total U.S. passenger enplanements.
    - S: Small hub that accounts for between 0.05% and 0.25% of total U.S. passenger enplanements.
    - N: Nonhub that accounts for less than 0.05% of total U.S. passenger enplanements, but more than 10,000 annual enplanements.
  - CS: Commercial service – nonprimary are publicly owned airports that receive scheduled passenger service and have at least 2,500 passenger boardings each year.
  - R: Reliever airports are designated by the FAA to relieve congestion at a large commercial service airport and to provide more general aviation access to the overall community.
  - GA: General aviation airports are the largest single group of airports in the U.S. airport system. They are public-use airports that do not have scheduled service or have scheduled service with less than 2,500 passenger boardings each year.
- **Enplanements** – The number of enplanements (commercial passenger boardings) that occurred at the airport in calendar year 2024, as per FAA records released October 2025.

City served	FAA	IATA	ICAO	Airport name	Role	Enplanements (2024)
				**Commercial service – primary airports**		
Charleston	CHS	CHS	KCHS	**Charleston International Airport** / Charleston AFB	P-M	3,115,194
Columbia	CAE	CAE	KCAE	**Columbia Metropolitan Airport**	P-S	654,460
Florence	FLO	FLO	KFLO	**Florence Regional Airport**	P-N	24,728
Greenville	GSP	GSP	KGSP	**Greenville–Spartanburg International Airport** (Roger Milliken Field)	P-S	1,412,702
Hilton Head	HXD	HHH	KHXD	**Hilton Head Airport**	P-N	108,775
Myrtle Beach	MYR	MYR	KMYR	**Myrtle Beach International Airport**	P-S	1,894,929
				**Reliever airports**		
Columbia	CUB	CUB	KCUB	Jim Hamilton–L.B. Owens Airport (was Columbia Owens Downtown)	R	15
Rock Hill	UZA	RKH	KUZA	Rock Hill/York County Airport (Bryant Field)	R	30
				**General aviation airports**		
Aiken	AIK	AIK	KAIK	Aiken Regional Airport	GA	129
Allendale	AQX		KAQX	Allendale County Airport	GA	2
Anderson	AND	AND	KAND	Anderson Regional Airport	GA	40
Andrews	PHH	ADR	KPHH	Robert F. Swinnie Airport	GA	0
Bamberg	99N			Bamberg County Airport	GA	0
Barnwell	BNL	BNL	KBNL	Barnwell Regional Airport (was Barnwell County Airport)	GA	0
Beaufort	ARW	BFT	KARW	Beaufort Executive Airport	GA	646
Bennettsville	BBP	BTN	KBBP	Marlboro County Jetport (H.E. Avent Field)	GA	0
Bishopville	52J			Lee County Airport (Butters Field)	GA	0
Camden	CDN	CDN	KCDN	Woodward Field	GA	3
Charleston	JZI		KJZI	Charleston Executive Airport	GA	526
Cheraw	CQW	HCW	KCQW	Cheraw Municipal Airport (Lynch Bellinger Field)	GA	0
Chester	DCM		KDCM	Chester Catawba Regional Airport	GA	0
Clemson	CEU	CEU	KCEU	Oconee County Regional Airport	GA	145
Conway	HYW		KHYW	Conway-Horry County Airport	GA	3
Darlington	UDG		KUDG	Darlington County Airport	GA	0
Dillon	DLC	DLL	KDLC	Dillon County Airport	GA	0
Georgetown	GGE	GGE	KGGE	Georgetown County Airport	GA	112
Greenville	GMU	GMU	KGMU	Greenville Downtown Airport	GA	126
Greenville	GYH	GDC	KGYH	Donaldson Field	GA	2
Greenwood	GRD	GRD	KGRD	Greenwood County Airport	GA	0
Hartsville	HVS	HVS	KHVS	Hartsville Regional Airport	GA	0
Kingstree	CKI		KCKI	Williamsburg Regional Airport	GA	4
Lancaster	LKR		KLKR	Lancaster County Airport (McWhirter Field)	GA	0
Laurens	LUX		KLUX	Laurens County Airport	GA	0
Loris	5J9			Twin City Airport	GA	0
Manning	MNI		KMNI	Santee Cooper Regional Airport	GA	0
Marion	MAO		KMAO	Marion County Airport	GA	0
Moncks Corner	MKS		KMKS	Berkeley County Airport	GA	4
Mount Pleasant	LRO		KLRO	Mount Pleasant Regional Airport (Faison Field)	GA	72
Newberry	EOE		KEOE	Newberry County Airport	GA	0
North Myrtle Beach	CRE	CRE	KCRE	Grand Strand Airport	GA	35
Orangeburg	OGB	OGB	KOGB	Orangeburg Municipal Airport	GA	4
Pageland	PYG		KPYG	Pageland Airport	GA	0
Pelion	6J0			Lexington County Airport	GA	0
Pickens	LQK	LQK	KLQK	Pickens County Airport	GA	11
Ridgeland	3J1			Ridgeland-Claude Dean Airport	GA	41
St. George	6J2			St. George Airport	GA	0
Saluda	6J4			Saluda County Airport	GA	0
Spartanburg	SPA	SPA	KSPA	Spartanburg Downtown Memorial Airport (Simpson Field)	GA	16
Summerville	DYB		KDYB	Summerville Airport	GA	0
Sumter	SMS	SUM	KSMS	Sumter Airport	GA	22
Union	35A			Union County Airport (Troy Shelton Field)	GA	0
Walterboro	RBW	RBW	KRBW	Lowcountry Regional Airport	GA	52
Winnsboro	FDW		KFDW	Fairfield County Airport	GA	0
				**Other public-use airports** (not listed in NPIAS)		
Clio	9W9			Clio Crop Care Airport		
Darlington	6J7			Branhams Airport		
Graniteville	S17			Twin Lakes Airport		
Green Sea	S79			Green Sea Airport		
Hampton	3J0			Hampton County Airport		
Holly Hill	5J5			Holly Hill Airport		
Lake City	51J			Lake City Municipal Airport (C.J. Evans Field)		
Lancaster	T73			Kirk Air Base		
Landrum	33A			Fairview Airport		
McCormick	S19			McCormick County Airport		
Orangeburg	1DS			Dry Swamp Airport		
Timmonsville	58J			Huggins Memorial Airport		
Trenton	6J6			Edgefield County Airport		
				**Military use airports**		
Beaufort	NBC		KNBC	MCAS Beaufort (Merritt Field)		0
Eastover	MMT	MMT	KMMT	McEntire JNGB		0
North	XNO		KXNO	North Air Force Auxiliary Field		
Sumter	SSC	SSC	KSSC	Shaw Air Force Base		996
				**Notable former airports**		
Calhoun Falls	~~0A2~~			Hester Memorial Airport (closed 2014-2020?)		
Hemingway	~~38J~~			Hemingway-Stuckey Airport (closed 2014-2017?)		
Lane	~~43J~~			Lane Airport (closed 1983)		
North Charleston				NAS Charleston (closed after WWII)		
Parris Island				Page Field (Marine Corps airfield, closed 1950s)		

== See also ==
- South Carolina World War II Army Airfields
- Wikipedia:WikiProject Aviation/Airline destination lists: North America#South Carolina
