= Summerville Airport =

Airport in South Carolina, United States

- IATA: none; ICAO: KDYB; FAA LID: DYB

Summary
- Airport type: Public
- Owner: Dorchester County
- Serves: Summerville, South Carolina
- Elevation AMSL: 56 ft / 17 m
- Coordinates: 33°03′48″N 080°16′46″W

Map
- Location of airport in South Carolina

Runways
Direction	Length		Surface
Direction	ft	m	Surface
6/24	5,000	1,524	Asphalt

Statistics (2019)
- Aircraft operations: 9,250
- Based aircraft: 64
- Source: Federal Aviation Administration

Summerville Airport (ICAO: KDYB, FAA LID: DYB) is a county-owned, public-use airport located five nautical miles (6 mi, 9 km) northwest of the central business district of Summerville, a city in Dorchester County, South Carolina, United States. It is included in the National Plan of Integrated Airport Systems for 2011–2015, which categorized it as a general aviation facility.

Although most U.S. airports use the same three-letter location identifier for the FAA and IATA, this airport is assigned DYB by the FAA but has no designation from the IATA.

== Facilities and aircraft ==
Summerville Airport covers an area of 195 acres (79 ha) at an elevation of 56 feet (17 m) above mean sea level. It has one runway designated 6/24 with an asphalt surface measuring 5,000 by 75 feet (1,524 x 23 m).

For the 12-month period ending November 27, 2019, the airport had 9,250 aircraft operations, an average of 25 per day: 88% general aviation, 9% air taxi, and 3% military. At that time there were 64 aircraft based at this airport: 84% single-engine, 14% multi-engine, and 2% helicopter.

== See also ==
- St. George Airport (FAA: 6J2) located at 33°11′44″N 080°30′30″W in St. George, Dorchester County, South Carolina.
- List of airports in South Carolina
