= Oconee County Regional Airport =

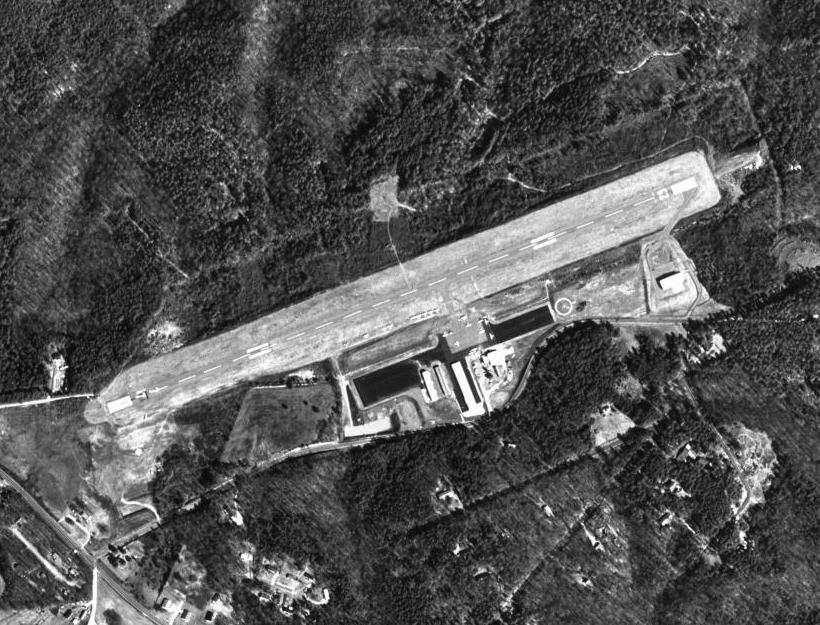
- IATA: CEU; ICAO: KCEU; FAA LID: CEU

Summary
- Airport type: Public
- Owner: Oconee County
- Serves: Seneca, South Carolina; Clemson, South Carolina
- Elevation AMSL: 891 ft / 272 m
- Coordinates: 34°40′18.9″N 082°53′12.5″W
- Website: http://oconeecountyairport.com/
- Interactive map of Oconee County Regional Airport

Runways
| Direction | Length | | Surface |
| Direction | ft | m | Surface |
|---|---|---|---|
| 7/25 | 5,000 | 1,524 | Asphalt |

Statistics (2023)
- Aircraft operations: 21,150
- Based aircraft: 58
- Source: Federal Aviation Administration

Oconee County Regional Airport (IATA: CEU, ICAO: KCEU, FAA LID: CEU) is a county-owned municipal airport in Oconee County, South Carolina, 3 miles (4.8 km) west of Clemson. Clemson University's Flying Club and the Flying Tigers Skydiving Club are based at the airport. The non-profit 401(c)(7) Golden Corner Flying Club LLC is based here. During football season, the airport sees a spike in activity, due to its proximity to the University and Memorial Stadium.

== Facilities and aircraft ==
Oconee County Regional Airport covers an area of 262 acres (106 ha) at an elevation of 891 feet (272 m) above mean sea level. It has one asphalt paved runway designated 7/25 which measures 5,000 by 100 feet (1,524 x 30 m).

The airport has plans to extend west the existing runway to an ultimate length of 6,000 ft. This would require the repositioning of Shiloh Road in Oconee County.

For the 12-month period ending March 16, 2023, the airport had 21,150 aircraft operations, an average of 58 per day: 92% general aviation, 7% air taxi and less than 1% military. At that time there were 58 aircraft based at this airport: 52 single-engine, 3 multi-engine, 1 jet, and 2 helicopters.

== See also ==
- List of airports in South Carolina
