= Newberry County Airport =

- IATA: none; ICAO: KEOE; FAA LID: EOE

Summary
- Airport type: Public
- Owner: Newberry County
- Serves: Newberry, South Carolina
- Elevation AMSL: 570 ft / 174 m
- Coordinates: 34°18′34″N 081°38′26″W
- Website: NewberryCounty.net/...
- Interactive map of Newberry County Airport

Runways
Direction	Length		Surface
Direction	ft	m	Surface
4/22	4,001	1,220	Asphalt

Statistics (2023)
- Aircraft operations: 4,100
- Based aircraft: 17
- Source: Federal Aviation Administration

Newberry County Airport (ICAO: KEOE, FAA LID: EOE, formerly 27J) is a county-owned public-use airport in Newberry County, South Carolina, United States. It is located three nautical miles (6 km) north of the central business district of Newberry, South Carolina.

Although many U.S. airports use the same three-letter location identifier for the FAA and IATA, this facility is assigned EOE by the FAA but has no designation from the IATA. The airport was built in 1946 with two grass runways. The current asphalt runway was constructed in October 2008.

== Facilities and aircraft ==
Newberry County Airport covers an area of 196 acres (79 ha) at an elevation of 570 feet (174 m) above mean sea level. It has one runway designated 4/22 with an asphalt surface measuring 4,001 by 75 feet (1,220 x 23 m).

For the 12-month period ending June 13, 2023, the airport had 4,100 aircraft operations, an average of 79 per week: 94% general aviation, 3% air taxi, and 2% military. At that time there were 17 aircraft based at this airport: 15 single-engine, and 2 multi-engine.

== See also ==
- List of airports in South Carolina
