= Laurens County Airport =

- IATA: none; ICAO: KLUX; FAA LID: LUX

Summary
- Airport type: Public
- Owner: Laurens County
- Serves: Laurens, South Carolina
- Elevation AMSL: 697 ft / 212 m
- Coordinates: 34°30′25″N 081°56′50″W
- Interactive map of Laurens County Airport

Runways
Direction	Length		Surface
Direction	ft	m	Surface
8/26	3,898	1,188	Asphalt

Statistics (2009)
- Aircraft operations: 5,500
- Based aircraft: 13
- Source: Federal Aviation Administration

Laurens County Airport (ICAO: KLUX, FAA LID: LUX, formerly 34A) is a county-owned public-use airport in Laurens County, South Carolina, United States. It is located three nautical miles (6 km) east of the central business district of Laurens, South Carolina.

Although many U.S. airports use the same three-letter location identifier for the FAA and IATA, this facility is assigned LUX by the FAA but has no designation from the IATA (which assigned LUX to Findel Airport in Luxembourg).

== Facilities and aircraft ==
Laurens County Airport covers an area of 78 acres (32 ha) at an elevation of 697 feet (212 m) above mean sea level. It has one runway designated 8/26 with an asphalt surface measuring 3,898 by 75 feet (1,188 x 23 m).

For the 12-month period ending May 22, 2009, the airport had 5,500 aircraft operations, an average of 15 per day: 94% general aviation, 3% air taxi, and 3% military. At that time there were 13 aircraft based at this airport, all single-engine.

== See also ==
- List of airports in South Carolina
