= Twin Lakes Airport (South Carolina) =

- IATA: none; ICAO: none; FAA LID: S17

Summary
- Airport type: Public
- Owner: John Johnson
- Serves: Graniteville, South Carolina
- Elevation AMSL: 540 ft (160 m)
- Coordinates: 33°38′44″N 081°52′01″W
- Interactive map of Twin Lakes Airport

Runways
Direction	Length		Surface
Direction	ft	m	Surface
6/24	4,000	1,219	Asphalt

Statistics (2023)
- Aircraft operations: 1,500
- Based aircraft: 55
- Source: Federal Aviation Administration

Twin Lakes Airport (FAA LID: S17) is a privately owned, public-use airport located four miles (6 km) northwest of the central business district of Graniteville, in Aiken County, South Carolina, United States. A portion of the airport is also located in Edgefield County.

== Facilities and aircraft ==
Twin Lakes Airport covers an area of 35 acres (14 ha) and has one runway designated 6/24 with a 4,000 x 60 ft (1,219 x 18 m) asphalt surface.

For the 12-month period ending April 12, 2023, the airport had 1,500 general aviation aircraft operations, an average of 29 per week. At that time there were 52 single-engine aircraft and 3 ultra-light aircraft based at this airport.

== See also ==
- List of airports in South Carolina
