= Bamberg County Airport =

- IATA: none; ICAO: none; FAA LID: 99N

Summary
- Airport type: Public
- Owner: Bamberg County
- Serves: Bamberg, South Carolina
- Location: Bamberg County, near Bamberg, South Carolina
- Elevation AMSL: 231 ft (70 m)
- Coordinates: 33°18′16″N 081°6′30″W
- Website: https://bambergair.com/

Map
- Location within South Carolina

Runways
Direction	Length		Surface
Direction	ft	m	Surface
5/23	3,603	1,098	Asphalt

Statistics (2020)
- Aircraft operations: 700
- Based aircraft: 3
- Source: Federal Aviation Administration

Bamberg County Airport (FAA LID: 99N) also known as Tobul Field, is a county-owned public-use airport located 5 nautical miles (9.3 kilometres) west of the central business district of Bamberg, a city in Bamberg County, South Carolina, United States. The airport serves the general aviation community, with no scheduled commercial airline service. It was officially activated in October 1982.

== Facilities and aircraft ==
Bamberg County Airport covers an area of 94 acres (38 ha) at an elevation of 231 feet (70 m) above mean sea level. It has one asphalt paved runway: 5/23 is 3,603 feet (1,098 m) by 60 feet (18 m).

For the 12-month period ending 29 July 2020, the airport had 700 aircraft operations, an average of 2 per day: 100% general aviation, 0% air taxi and 0% military. At that time there were 3 aircraft based at this airport, all single-engine.

== Dedication ==
On 22 March 2022, Bamberg County Airport hosted a dedication ceremony to name the airport's airfield (including the runway and maintenance area) Tobul Field after Bamberg County businessman Joseph Tobul. Tobul had selected the city of Bamberg as the location of a plant for Tobul Accumulators, of which he was the CEO.

He would also later construct a hangar at the airport, and contribute to maintaining the facilities there. Additionally, he gained recognition for restoring several World War II aircraft, namely an F4U Corsair named Korean War Hero. He died when flying the Corsair at an airshow on 10 November, 2002.

== See also ==
- List of airports in South Carolina
