= Allendale County Airport =

- IATA: none; ICAO: KAQX; FAA LID: AQX

Summary
- Airport type: Public
- Owner: Allendale County
- Serves: Allendale, South Carolina
- Location: Allendale County, near Allendale, South Carolina
- Elevation AMSL: 162 ft (49 m)
- Coordinates: 32°59′42″N 081°16′13″W

Map
- Location within South Carolina

Runways
Direction	Length		Surface
Direction	ft	m	Surface
17/35	4,990	1,521	Asphalt

Statistics (2018)
- Aircraft operations: 7,020
- Based aircraft: 10
- Source: Federal Aviation Administration

Allendale County Airport (ICAO: KAQX, FAA LID: AQX) is a county-owned public-use airport located 2 nautical miles (3.7 kilometres) southeast of the central business district of Allendale, a city in Allendale County, South Carolina, United States. The airport serves the general aviation community, with no scheduled commercial airline service.

== Facilities and aircraft ==
Allendale County Airport covers an area of 95 acres (38 ha) at an elevation of 162 feet (49 m) above mean sea level. It has one asphalt paved runway: 17/35 is 4,990 feet (1,520 m) by 75 feet (23 m).

For the 12-month period ending 24 October 2018, the airport had 7,020 aircraft operations, an average of 19 per day: 97.6% general aviation, 2.1% air taxi and 0.3% military. At that time there were 10 aircraft based at this airport, all single-engine.

== See also ==
- List of airports in South Carolina
