= Williamsburg Regional Airport =

- IATA: none; ICAO: KCKI; FAA LID: CKI

Summary
- Airport type: Public
- Owner: Williamsburg County
- Serves: Kingstree, South Carolina
- Elevation AMSL: 67 ft / 20 m
- Coordinates: 33°43′02″N 079°51′25″W
- Website: Official website

Map
- Location of airport in South Carolina CKI (the United States)

Runways
Direction	Length		Surface
Direction	ft	m	Surface
14/32	5,000	1,524	Asphalt

Statistics (2012)
- Aircraft operations: 6,440
- Based aircraft: 12
- Source: Federal Aviation Administration

Williamsburg Regional Airport (IATA: None, ICAO: KCKI, FAA LID: CKI) is a county-owned public-use airport located three nautical miles (3 mi, 5 km) west of the central business district of Kingstree, in Williamsburg County, South Carolina, United States.

The airport is included in the FAA's National Plan of Integrated Airport Systems for 2011–2015, which categorized it as a general aviation facility. It has no scheduled commercial service.

== Facilities and aircraft ==
Williamsburg Regional covers an area of 396 acres (160 ha) at an elevation of 67 feet (20 m) above mean sea level. It has one runway designated 14/32 with an asphalt surface measuring 5,000 x 75 feet (1,524 x 23 m). Runway 14 is equipped with a NDB approach. Runway 36 is equipped for RNAV approaches. The magnetic variation from 2015 is 6 degrees West.

For the 12-month period ending June 14, 2012, the airport had 6,440 aircraft operations, on average 115 per week: 99% general aviation and 1% military. At that time there were 12 aircraft based at this airport: 7 single-engine, 3 multi-engine, and 2 ultralight.

== See also ==
- List of airports in South Carolina
