= Santee Cooper Regional Airport =

Airport in South Carolina, United States

- IATA: none; ICAO: KMNI; FAA LID: MNI

Summary
- Airport type: Public
- Owner: Clarendon County
- Serves: Manning, South Carolina
- Elevation AMSL: 103 ft (31 m)
- Coordinates: 33°35′14″N 080°12′31″W
- Interactive map of Santee Cooper Regional Airport

Runways
Direction	Length		Surface
Direction	ft	m	Surface
2/20	3,602	1,098	Asphalt

Statistics (2009)
- Aircraft operations: 17,600
- Based aircraft: 22
- Source: Federal Aviation Administration

Santee Cooper Regional Airport (ICAO: KMNI, FAA LID: MNI) is a public use airport located seven nautical miles (13 km) south of the central business district of Manning, a city in Clarendon County, South Carolina, United States. It is owned by Clarendon County and began service in 1966. According to the FAA's National Plan of Integrated Airport Systems for 2009–2013, it is categorized as a general aviation facility.

Although many U.S. airports use the same three-letter location identifier for the FAA and IATA, this facility is assigned MNI by the FAA but has no designation from the IATA (which assigned MNI to John A. Osborne Airport in Montserrat).

== Facilities and aircraft ==
Santee Cooper Regional Airport covers an area of 67 acres (27 ha) at an elevation of 103 feet (31 m) above mean sea level. It has one runway designated 2/20 with an asphalt surface measuring 3,602 by 75 feet (1,098 x 23 m).

For the 12-month period ending August 20, 2009, the airport had 17,600 aircraft operations, an average of 48 per day: 99.7% general aviation and 0.3% military. At that time there were 22 aircraft based at this airport: 64% single-engine, 9% multi-engine and 27% glider.

== See also ==
- List of airports in South Carolina
