= Lancaster County Airport =

Lancaster County Airport McWhirter Field
- IATA: none; ICAO: KLKR; FAA LID: LKR

Summary
- Airport type: Public
- Owner: Lancaster County
- Serves: Lancaster, South Carolina
- Elevation AMSL: 486 ft / 148 m
- Coordinates: 34°43′22″N 080°51′17″W

Map
- Location of airport in South Carolina LKR (the United States)

Runways
Direction	Length		Surface
Direction	ft	m	Surface
6/24	6,004	1,830	Asphalt

Statistics (2009)
- Aircraft operations: 23,850
- Based aircraft: 49
- Source: Federal Aviation Administration

Lancaster County Airport (ICAO: KLKR, FAA LID: LKR), also known as McWhirter Field, is a county-owned, public-use airport located four nautical miles (7 km) west of the central business district of Lancaster, in Lancaster County, South Carolina, United States.

Although most U.S. airports use the same three-letter location identifier for the FAA and IATA, this airport is assigned LKR by the FAA but has no designation from the IATA (which assigned LKR to Las Khoreh in Somalia).

== Facilities and aircraft ==
Lancaster County Airport covers an area of 301 acres (122 ha) at an elevation of 486 feet (148 m) above mean sea level. It has one runway designated 6/24 with an asphalt surface measuring 6,004 by 100 feet (1,830 x 30 m).

For the 12-month period ending July 22, 2009, the airport had 23,850 aircraft operations, an average of 65 per day: 97% general aviation, 2% air taxi, and 1% military. At that time there were 49 single-engine aircraft based at this airport.

Lancaster County Airport is operated by Lancaster Aviation and provides fuel, maintenance and a terminal facility.

== See also ==
- List of airports in South Carolina
