= Lee County Airport (South Carolina) =

Lee County Airport Butters Field
- IATA: none; ICAO: none; FAA LID: 52J

Summary
- Airport type: Public
- Owner: Lee County
- Serves: Bishopville, South Carolina
- Location: Lee County, South Carolina
- Elevation AMSL: 211 ft / 64 m
- Coordinates: 34°14′40″N 080°14′10″W

Map
- Location of airport in South Carolina

Runways
Direction	Length		Surface
Direction	ft	m	Surface
6/24	3,200	975	Asphalt

Statistics (2020)
- Aircraft operations: 700
- Source: Federal Aviation Administration

Lee County Airport (FAA LID: 52J), also known as Butters Field, is a public use airport in Lee County, South Carolina, United States. It is owned by Lee County and located 2 nautical miles (3.7 kilometres) north of the central business district of Bishopville, South Carolina. This airport is included in the National Plan of Integrated Airport Systems for 2021–2025, which categorized it as a general aviation facility.

== Facilities and aircraft ==
Lee County-Butters Field covers an area of 63 acres (25 ha) at an elevation of 211 feet (64 m) above mean sea level. It has one runway designated 6/24 with an asphalt surface measuring 3,200 feet (980 m) by 60 feet (18 m).

For the 12-month period ending 19 September 2020, the airport had 700 general aviation aircraft operations, an average of 58 per month: 100% general aviation, 0% air taxi and 0% military. At that time there were 9 aircraft based at this airport, 8 single-engine and 1 multi-engine aircraft.

== See also ==
- List of airports in South Carolina
