= Orangeburg Municipal Airport =

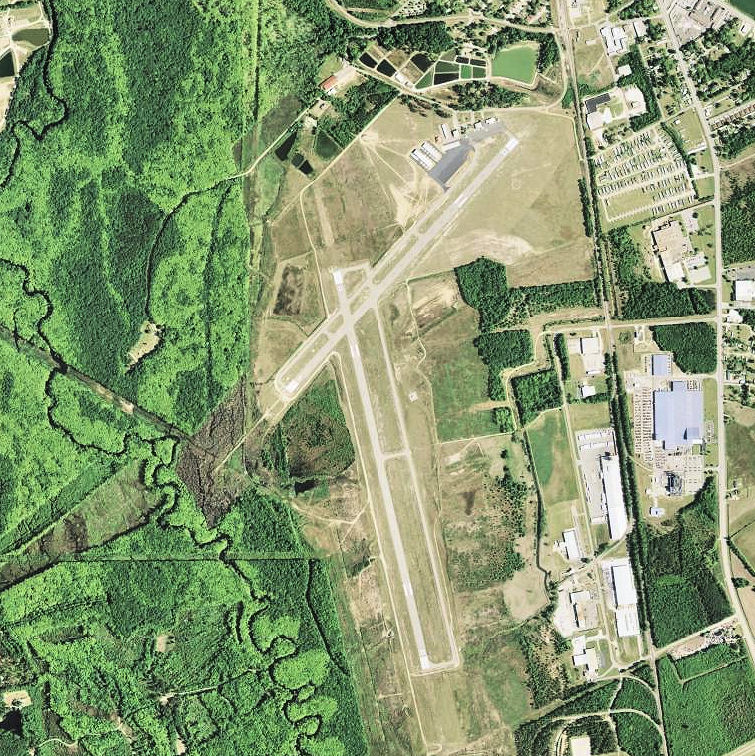
- Orthophoto from USGS
- IATA: OGB; ICAO: KOGB; FAA LID: OGB

Summary
- Airport type: Public
- Owner: City of Orangeburg
- Serves: Orangeburg, South Carolina
- Elevation AMSL: 195 ft / 59 m
- Coordinates: 33°27′25″N 080°51′34″W

Map
- Location of airport in South Carolina

Runways
Direction	Length		Surface
Direction	ft	m	Surface
17/35	5,399	1,646	Asphalt
5/23	4,508	1,374	Asphalt

Statistics (2011)
- Aircraft operations: 22,420
- Based aircraft: 22
- Source: Federal Aviation Administration

Orangeburg Municipal Airport (IATA: OGB, ICAO: KOGB, FAA LID: OGB) is a city-owned, public-use airport located two nautical miles (4 km) south of the central business district of Orangeburg, a city in Orangeburg County, South Carolina, United States. It is included in the National Plan of Integrated Airport Systems for 2011–2015, which categorized it as a general aviation facility. The airport does not have scheduled commercial airline service.

During World War II, the 58th Flying Training Detachment, operated by the Hawthorne School of Aeronautics, trained both U.S. and French airmen at what was Hawthorne Field. The detachment was supervised by the 29th Flying Training Wing.

== Facilities and aircraft ==
Orangeburg Municipal Airport covers an area of 300 acres (121 ha) at an elevation of 195 feet (59 m) above mean sea level. It has two asphalt paved runways: 17/35 is 5,399 by 100 feet (1,646 x 30 m) and 5/23 is 4,508 by 100 feet (1,374 x 30 m).

For the 12-month period ending August 12, 2011, the airport had 22,420 aircraft operations, an average of 61 per day: 99% general aviation, 1% air taxi, and <1% military. At that time there were 22 aircraft based at this airport: 73% single-engine and 27% multi-engine.

== See also ==
- List of airports in South Carolina
- South Carolina World War II Army Airfields
