= St. George Airport (South Carolina) =

- IATA: none; ICAO: none; FAA LID: 6J2

Summary
- Airport type: Public
- Owner: Dorchester County
- Serves: St. George, South Carolina
- Elevation AMSL: 85 ft / 26 m
- Coordinates: 33°11′44″N 080°30′30″W

Map
- Location of airport in South Carolina

Runways
Direction	Length		Surface
Direction	ft	m	Surface
5/23	3,201	976	Asphalt

Statistics (2011)
- Aircraft operations: 5,200
- Based aircraft: 12
- Source: Federal Aviation Administration

St. George Airport (FAA LID: 6J2) is a county-owned, public-use airport located three nautical miles (6 km) east of the central business district of St. George, a city in Dorchester County, South Carolina, United States. It is included in the National Plan of Integrated Airport Systems for 2011–2015, which categorized it as a general aviation facility.

== Facilities and aircraft ==
St. George Airport covers an area of 103 acres (42 ha) at an elevation of 85 feet (26 m) above mean sea level. It has one runway designated 5/23 with an asphalt surface measuring 3,201 by 60 feet (976 x 18 m).

For the 12-month period ending April 20, 2011, the airport had 5,200 general aviation aircraft operations, an average of 14 per day. At that time there were 12 aircraft based at this airport: 58% single-engine and 42% ultralight.

More recently: St. George Airport reported 3 single-engine aircraft and 1 ultralight aircraft based at the airport in 2021. AirNav reports ~83 flights/month (<3 per day) for the 12-month period ending 23 May 2024.

== See also ==
- Summerville Airport (FAA: DYB) located at 33°03′48″N 080°16′46″W in Summerville, Dorchester County, South Carolina.
- List of airports in South Carolina
