= Lake City Municipal Airport (South Carolina) =

Lake City Municipal Airport CJ Evans Field
- IATA: none; ICAO: none; FAA LID: 51J

Summary
- Airport type: Public
- Owner: Town of Lake City
- Serves: Lake City, South Carolina
- Elevation AMSL: 80 ft / 24 m
- Coordinates: 33°51′13″N 079°46′05″W
- Interactive map of Lake City Municipal Airport

Runways
Direction	Length		Surface
Direction	ft	m	Surface
1/19	3,700	1,128	Asphalt

Statistics (2023)
- Aircraft operations (year ending 6/6/2023): 2,010
- Based aircraft: 10
- Source: Federal Aviation Administration

Lake City Municipal Airport (FAA LID: 51J), also known as CJ Evans Field, is a public use airport located two nautical miles (4 km) southwest of the central business district of Lake City, in Florence County, South Carolina, United States. It is owned by the Town of Lake City.

== Facilities and aircraft ==
Lake City Municipal Airport covers an area of 39 acres (16 ha) at an elevation of 80 feet (24 m) above mean sea level. It has one runway designated 1/19 with an asphalt surface measuring 3,700 by 75 feet (1,128 x 23 m).

For the 12-month period ending on June 6, 2023, the airport had 2,010 aircraft operations: 99% general aviation, <1% military, and 1% air taxi. At that time there were 10 aircraft based at this airport: 4 single-engine and 6 helicopter.

== See also ==
- List of airports in South Carolina
