= Berkeley County Airport =

Airport in South Carolina, United States

- IATA: none; ICAO: KMKS; FAA LID: MKS

Summary
- Airport type: Public
- Owner: County of Berkeley
- Operator: Berkeley County Government
- Serves: Moncks Corner, South Carolina
- Elevation AMSL: 73 ft (22 m)
- Coordinates: 33°11′08″N 080°02′10″W
- Website: berkeleycountysc.gov/...
- Interactive map of Berkeley County Airport

Runways
Direction	Length		Surface
Direction	ft	m	Surface
5/23	4,351	1,326	Asphalt

Statistics (2019)
- Aircraft operations: 8,100
- Based aircraft: 33
- Source: Federal Aviation Administration

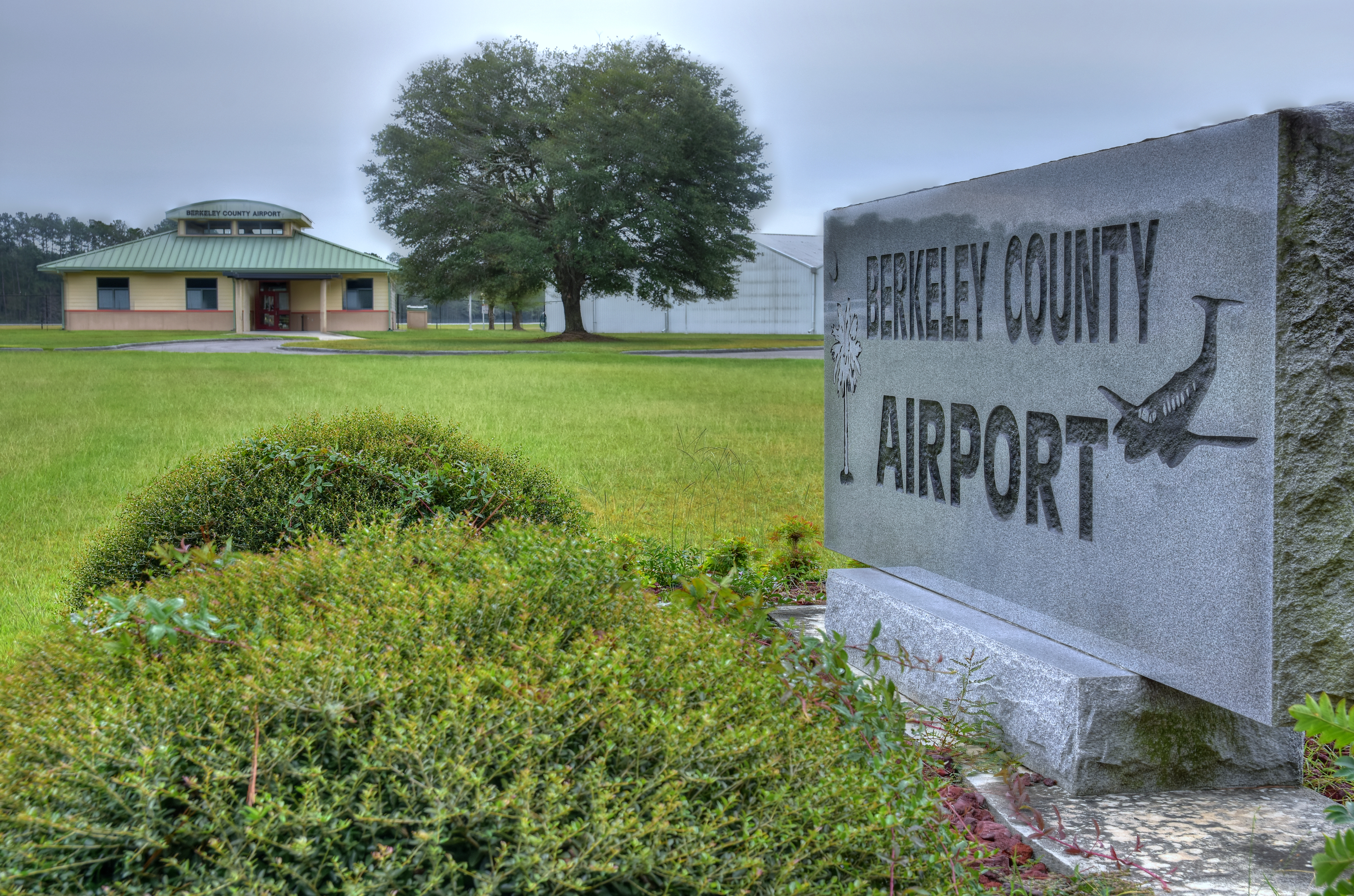
Berkeley County Airport

Berkeley County Airport (ICAO: KMKS, FAA LID: MKS, formerly 50J) is a county-owned public-use airport in Berkeley County, South Carolina, United States. It is located one nautical mile (1.85 km) southwest of the central business district of Moncks Corner, South Carolina.

Although many U.S. airports use the same three-letter location identifier for the FAA and IATA, Berkeley County Airport is assigned MKS by the FAA but has no designation from the IATA (which assigned MKS to Mekane Selam Airport in Ethiopia).

== Facilities and aircraft ==
The Berkeley County government took over the FBO at the airport on July 1, 1999.

The airport covers an area of 236 acres (96 ha) at an elevation of 73 feet (22 m) above mean sea level. It has one runway designated 5/23 with an asphalt surface measuring 5,001 by 75 feet (1,326 x 23 m).

For the 12-month period ending November 15, 2019, the airport had 8,100 aircraft operations, an average of 22 per day: 92% general aviation, 7% air taxi, and 1% military. At that time there were 33 aircraft based at this airport: 88% single-engine, 9% multi-engine, and 3% jet.

== See also ==
- List of airports in South Carolina
