= Green Sea Airport =

- IATA: none; ICAO: none; FAA LID: S79

Summary
- Airport type: Public
- Owner: Earl Shaw
- Location: Green Sea, South Carolina
- Elevation AMSL: 95 ft (29 m)
- Coordinates: 34°11′08″N 079°01′14″W
- Interactive map of Green Sea Airport

Runways
Direction	Length		Surface
Direction	ft	m	Surface
9/27	3,600	1,097	Turf

Statistics (2022)
- Aircraft operations (year ending 5/5/2022): 250
- Source: Federal Aviation Administration

Green Sea Airport (FAA LID: S79) is a privately owned, public-use airport in Horry County, South Carolina, United States. It is located four nautical miles (7 km) northwest of the central business district of Green Sea, South Carolina.

== Facilities and aircraft ==
Green Sea Airport covers an area of 30 acres (12 ha) at an elevation of 95 feet (29 m) above mean sea level. It has one runway designated 9/27 with a turf surface measuring 3,600 by 100 feet (1,097 x 30 m).

For the 12-month period ending May 5, 2022, the airport had 250 general aviation aircraft operations, an average of 21 per month.

== See also ==
- List of airports in South Carolina
