= Sumter Airport =

Airport in South Carolina, United States

- IATA: SUM; ICAO: KSMS; FAA LID: SMS

Summary
- Airport type: Public
- Owner: City & County of Sumter
- Serves: Sumter, South Carolina
- Elevation AMSL: 182 ft / 55 m
- Coordinates: 33°59′42″N 080°21′41″W
- Interactive map of Sumter Airport

Runways
Direction	Length		Surface
Direction	ft	m	Surface
5/23	5,501	1,677	Asphalt
14/32	3,081	939	Turf

Statistics (2021)
- Aircraft operations (year ending 6/17/2021): 12,100
- Based aircraft: 31
- Source: Federal Aviation Administration

Sumter Airport (IATA: SUM, ICAO: KSMS, FAA LID: SMS) is a public use airport located 4 nmi (7.4 km) north of the central business district of Sumter, a city in Sumter County, South Carolina, United States. The airport is owned and operated by the Sumter County under an Airport Commission structure and has a county appointed airport manager, Jeff Knauer.

Although most U.S. airports use the same three-letter location identifier for the FAA and IATA, Sumter Airport is assigned SMS by the FAA and SUM by the IATA (which assigned SMS to Sainte Marie Airport in Nosy Boraha, Madagascar).

== Facilities and aircraft ==
Sumter Airport covers an area of 429 acres (174 ha) at an elevation of 182 feet (55 m) above mean sea level. It has two runways: 5/23 is 5,501 by 100 feet (1,677 x 30 m) with an asphalt surface; 14/32 is 3,081 by 120 feet (939 x 37 m) with a turf surface.

For the 12-month period ending June 17, 2021, the airport had 12,100 aircraft operations, an average of 33 per day: 96% general aviation, 3% air taxi and <1% military. At that time there were 31 aircraft based at this airport: 21 single-engine, 5 multi-engine, 4 jet, and 1 helicopter.

== See also ==
- List of airports in South Carolina
