= St. George Regional Airport =

Airport in Utah, United States

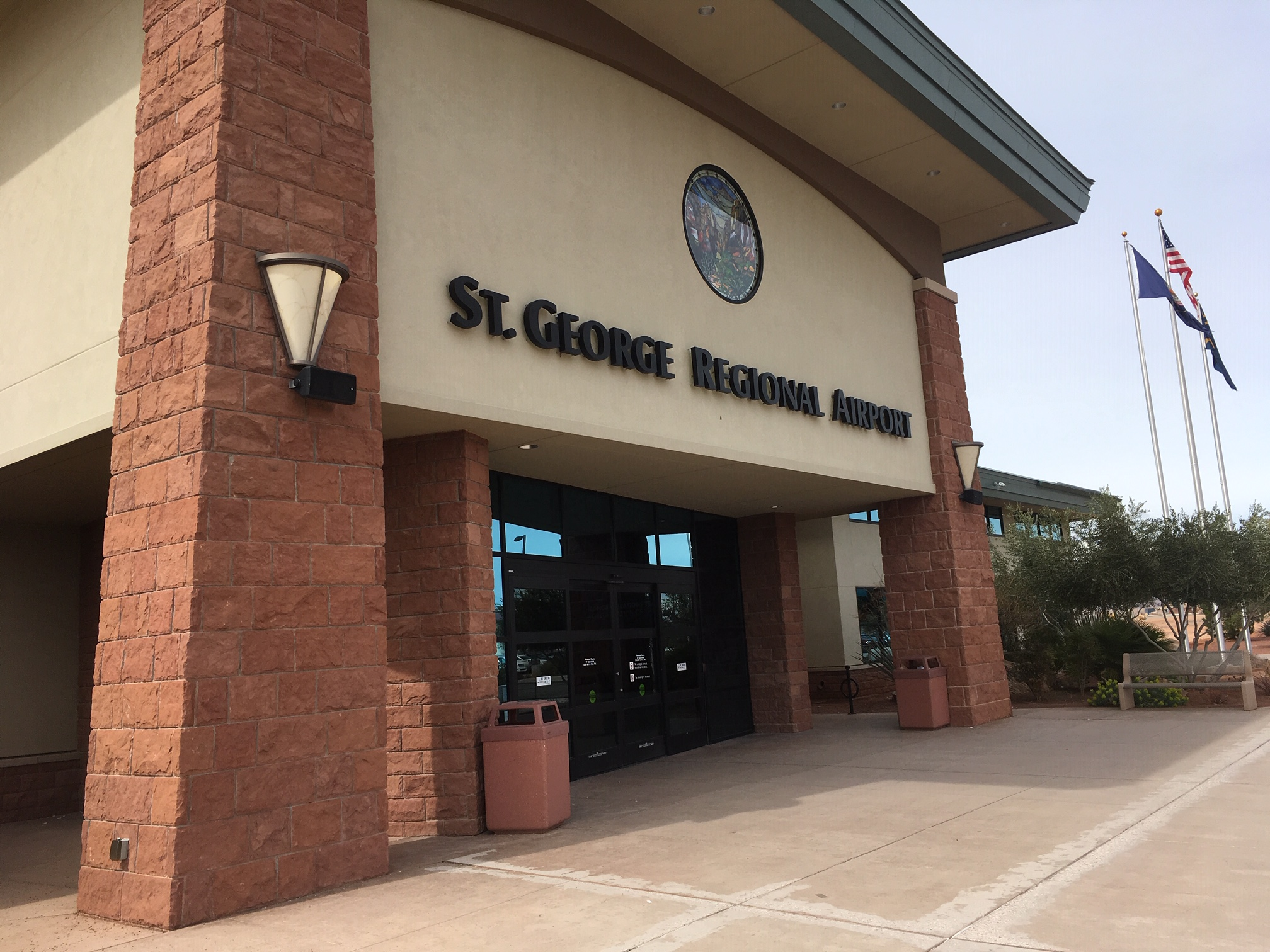
- IATA: SGU; ICAO: KSGU; FAA LID: SGU

Summary
- Airport type: Public
- Owner/Operator: City of St. George
- Serves: St. George, Utah
- Elevation AMSL: 2,884 ft / 879 m
- Coordinates: 37°02′11″N 113°30′37″W
- Website: www.flysgu.com

Map
- Interactive map of St. George Regional Airport

Runways
Direction	Length		Surface
Direction	ft	m	Surface
1/19	9,300	2,835	Asphalt

Statistics (2025)
- Total passengers: 431,607
- BASED aircraft: 195
- Source: Federal Aviation Administration

St. George Regional Airport (IATA: SGU, ICAO: KSGU, FAA LID: SGU) is a city-owned airport in St. George, Washington County, Utah.

The airport opened on January 13, 2011, a replacement for smaller land-locked St. George Municipal Airport, atop a mesa in the city, which was declared unsuitable for expansion. It is served by SkyWest Airlines with code sharing flights operated on behalf of American Airlines, Delta Air Lines and United Airlines. SkyWest, one of the largest regional airlines in the world, is based in St. George.

The former airport used SGU as the location identifier for the Federal Aviation Administration (FAA) and International Air Transport Association (IATA). The new airport was assigned a transitional identifier DXZ by the FAA during development, but retained the IATA designation SGU. Once the former airport was decommissioned, FAA transitioned the SGU designation to represent the new airport.

== History ==
The prospect of a new airport for the region had been considered for many years. The old airport had a small terminal with a single gate and a runway that was too small for larger aircraft. It had no good room for expansion, as it was situated atop a mesa. With the growth of the area and tourism rapidly increasing, the need for a new airport became more urgent. A site was chosen about 6 miles southeast of downtown at an abandoned airfield which had not seen air traffic since 1961 and most recently had been used for vehicle drag racing and radio controlled aircraft.

An environmental impact statement (EIS) for the present airport was completed in August 2006. The study concluded that the impact on the environment and noise pollution would be minimal. Plans for this new larger airport included a single 10,000 ft (3048m) runway suitable for regional jets and smaller mainline aircraft. The runway was initially planned to be oriented at about 010/190 degrees. It was also initially planned to be 9,300 by 150 feet (2,835 by 46 m) with subsequent plans for the runway to be extended to 11,500 by 150 feet (3,505 by 46 m). A 9,300 ft runway was eventually constructed.

The new St. George Airport was partially funded by grants from the FAA totaling around $123 million. The entire project was expected to cost about 159 million dollars. The city broke ground on the new site in October 2008 and the airport opened on January 13, 2011. SkyWest Airlines (operating as Delta Connection) announced that on January 13, 2011 the airline would begin nonstop daily services to Salt Lake City from the airport, using Canadair CRJ regional jets. SkyWest subsequently initiated nonstop Canadair CRJ regional jet services to Denver operating as United Express.

On July 13, 2015 the airport changed its name from St. George Municipal Airport to St. George Regional Airport in a bid to attract more airline services to the airport.

Late in 2018, Allegiant Air announced flights from St. George to Phoenix-Mesa Gateway Airport from November 9 of that year, which were the first mainline jets to serve St. George, as Allegiant operates Airbus A320 aircraft. However, Allegiant Air later suspended all flights to St. George Regional Airport.

Federal Aviation Administration records say the airport had 128,453 boardings (enplanements) in calendar year 2022, 153,00 in calendar year 2021, 80,562 in calendar year 2020 (during COVID-19 pandemic), 102,297 in calendar year 2019 (during which the airport was closed for part of the year), 123,060 in calendar year 2018, 103,569 in 2017, 103,569 in calendar year 2017, 78,680 in calendar year 2016, 69,680 in calendar year 2015, and 59,321 in calendar year 2014.

The St. George Regional Airport has been approved for the FAA Contract Tower Program in late 2022 or early 2023. If the city builds an air traffic control tower in the next 5 years, the FAA will staff it at no cost to the city or airport. The city requested $10 million from the Utah Legislature in 2023 to help with this and other airport projects. This is the first time in the airport's history where the city has requested funds from the state to help with an airport project.

=== 2019 closure ===
The airport was closed in May 2019 for reconstruction of its lone runway. Officials found soil issues from expansive clay at the airport only a few years after its opening, and sealed cracks quickly became ubiquitous on the runway and tarmac. The airport was closed through September 2019 as crews excavated as much as 17 feet of earth below the runway. The geotechnical considerations for the updated runway design are noteworthy and include a 5 ft thick compacted clay liner using conditioned clay from site, 12 feet of structural fill, and a bituminous geomembrane waterproofing layer. During the closure, the nearest commercial service airports would be Cedar City Regional Airport, 60 miles northeast, or Harry Reid International Airport near Las Vegas, 129 miles southwest.

== Facilities ==
St. George Regional Airport covers 1,204 acres (487 ha); its single runway, 1/19, is 9,300 by 150 feet (2,835 x 46 m). The airport has a 35,000-square-foot (3,300 m^{2}) terminal.

In the 12 months ending August 4, 2020 the airport had 80,105 aircraft operations, average 219 per day: 86% general aviation, 3% air taxi, 8% airline, and 2% military. 195 aircraft were then based at the airport: 150 single-engine, 20 multi-engine, 6 jet, 7 helicopter, 10 gliders and 2 ultralight.

The airport is serviced by two fixed-base operators: Million Air St. George and Sandstone Aviation.

== Airlines and destinations ==
The old St. George Municipal Airport was served by Bonanza Air Lines, which in the late 1950s, began flying Douglas DC-3s to Salt Lake City via Cedar City and Provo, and to Phoenix via Prescott. By 1962, Bonanza had replaced its DC-3s with larger Fairchild F-27 turboprops; however, this airline had ceased all service to St George, instead serving Cedar City, Utah, with the F-27, as this aircraft was deemed too large for the old airfield. SkyWest Airlines then started flying to Salt Lake City on June 19, 1972, via Cedar City. SkyWest later introduced Fairchild Swearingen Metroliner propjets followed by Embraer EMB-120 Brasilia propjets to the old airport before moving to the new airport.

In November 2016, American Eagle operated by SkyWest Airlines CRJ 200 regional jets began flying between St. George and Phoenix.

=== Passenger ===
Airlines	Destinations	Refs
American Eagle	Dallas/Fort Worth, Phoenix–Sky Harbor	
Delta Connection	Salt Lake City	
United Express	Denver, Los Angeles; Seasonal: Chicago–O'Hare	

== Statistics ==
=== Top destinations ===
Busiest domestic routes from SGU (February 2024 – January 2025)
Rank	Airport	Passengers	Carrier
1	Salt Lake City, Utah	77,290	Delta Connection
2	Phoenix–Sky Harbor, Arizona	33,200	American Eagle
3	Denver, Colorado	31,060	United Express
4	Dallas/Fort Worth, Texas	17,290	American Eagle
5	Los Angeles, California	4,920	United Express

=== Annual traffic ===
Annual passenger traffic at SGU
Year	Passengers	Year	Passengers	Year	Passengers
2016	157,000	2020	160,000	2024	346,349
2017	206,000	2021	302,000	2025	431,607
2018	245,000	2022	253,000	2026	
2019	203,000	2023	269,000	2027	

== Accidents and incidents ==
Between the St. George Municipal and Regional Airports there have been a total of 21 accidents or incidents in and around the airport since 1982 (less than one per year for 80K yearly operations).

- On May 26, 2012 around 1:30 a.m., four people were killed when a Cessna 172 crashed during takeoff. At the time, the airport was not staffed at night and used an automated system, so the wreckage was not found until more than 4 hours later. A security camera captured the plane taking off. It was later found that the pilot was intoxicated and the aircraft was 160 lb (73 kg) overweight.
- On July 17, 2012 around 1:00 a.m., Brian Hedglin, a suspended SkyWest Airlines pilot and fugitive murder suspect whose ex-girlfriend had recently been found stabbed to death at his Colorado Springs residence, apparently scaled the airport perimeter fence using a motorcycle for support. He boarded a parked SkyWest Canadair CRJ200ER regional jet, started the aircraft, and attempted to taxi from the gate, but clipped a jet bridge and the terminal building, damaging the left wing and causing a fuel leak. He then taxied the aircraft through a fence and into a parking lot, crashing into several parked cars, and shot himself dead in the aircraft aisle. The CRJ200ER, aircraft registration N865AS, was damaged beyond repair and written off; there was no one else aboard the aircraft and no reported injuries to anyone but Hedglin. Law enforcement was unable to determine Hedglin's motive for traveling to St. George to steal the aircraft. A security officer had found the motorcycle and was checking its registration inside the terminal when the crash occurred; officials said that a review of airport perimeter security would be conducted.

== See also ==
- List of airports in Utah
