= St. George Municipal Airport =

Former airport in Utah, United States

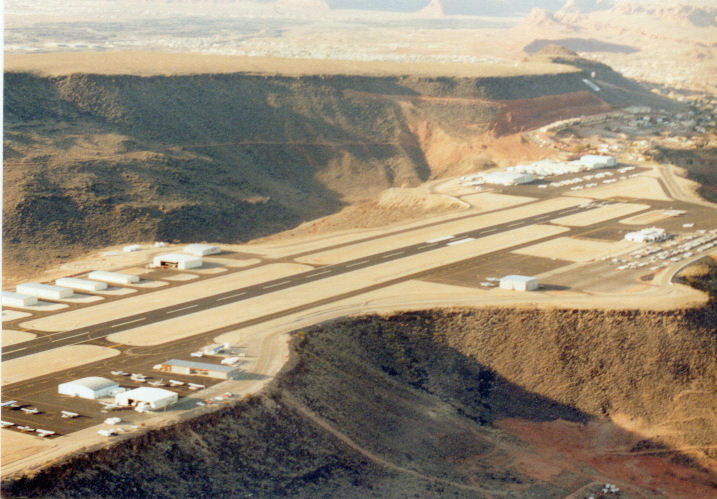
- Aerial photo, 2005
- IATA: ~~SGU~~; ICAO: ~~KSGU~~; FAA LID: ~~SGU~~

Summary
- Airport type: Public
- Operator: City of St. George
- Location: St. George, Utah
- Elevation AMSL: 2,941 ft / 896.4 m
- Coordinates: 37°05′26″N 113°35′35″W
- Website: www.FlySGU.com
- Interactive map of St. George Municipal Airport

Runways
Direction	Length		Surface
Direction	ft	m	Surface
16/34	6,606	2,014	Asphalt

Statistics (2008)
- Aircraft operations: 62,210
- Based aircraft: 177

St. George Municipal Airport (IATA: SGU, ICAO: KSGU, FAA LID: SGU) was a public airport in St. George, serving southern Utah, until 13 January 2011. It was used for general aviation and by St. George-based SkyWest Airlines on behalf of Delta Air Lines and United Airlines. SkyWest has served St. George since its founding in 1972. SkyWest, which is now one of the largest regional airlines in the world, continues to be based in St. George.

== Replacement airport ==
The prospect of a new airport for the region had been around for many years. The old St. George Municipal Airport, located on top of a mesa, was land-locked and had no room for expansion. The runway and terminal were too small for larger aircraft. With the rapid growth of the area and tourism increasing, a new airport became essential.

The new St. George Regional Airport (37°02′11″N 113°30′37″W) was built about 6 miles southeast of downtown at the site of an abandoned airfield, which had not seen air traffic since 1961 and most recently has been used for vehicle drag racing and radio controlled aircraft.

An Environmental Impact Statement (EIS) was completed in August 2006. The study concluded the impact on the environment and noise pollution would be minimal. Plans for the new airport include a single runway usable by regional jets and larger airliners. It is initially 9,300 by 150 feet, with plans for the runway to be extended to 11,500 ft. The new airport includes a precision instrument approach, which the old airport did not have.

The new airport has been partially funded by grants from the Federal Aviation Administration totaling US$24.2 million. The project was expected to cost between $170 million and $190 million. The city broke ground on the new site in October 2008, and the new airport opened on January 13, 2011.

== Facilities ==
The 274-acre (111 ha) facility included a 15,000-square-foot (1,400 m^{2}) terminal. It had one asphalt runway, 16/34, 6,606 feet (2,014 m) long.

In the year ending November 30, 2008 the airport had 62,210 aircraft operations, average 170 per day: 72% general aviation, 15% air taxi, 13 scheduled commercial, and <1% military. 177 aircraft were then based at this airport: 85% single-engine, 7% multi-engine, 2% jet, 4% helicopter, 1% glider and 1% ultralight.

== Airlines ==
On January 13, 2011, all airline flights moved to the new St. George Municipal Airport, which has since been renamed St. George Regional Airport.

The old airport was served by SkyWest Airlines operating as the Delta Connection with flights to Salt Lake City and also by United Express flights operated by SkyWest to Los Angeles with Fairchild Swearingen Metroliner and/or Embraer EMB-120 Brasilia turboprops being operated on both services. From 1958 to 1960 Bonanza Air Lines Douglas DC-3s flew to Salt Lake City via stops in Cedar City and Provo, and also to Phoenix, Arizona via Prescott. After 1960, Bonanza Fairchild F-27 turboprops only served the Cedar City Regional Airport as the St. George airfield was deemed too small for the F-27. On June 19, 1972 SkyWest began flying between St. George and Salt Lake City via a stop in Cedar City.
