= Cheraw Municipal Airport =

Cheraw Municipal Airport Lynch Bellinger Field
- IATA: HCW; ICAO: KCQW; FAA LID: CQW

Summary
- Airport type: Public
- Owner: Town of Cheraw
- Serves: Cheraw, South Carolina
- Elevation AMSL: 239 ft (73 m)
- Coordinates: 34°42′46″N 079°57′25″W

Map
- Location of airport in South Carolina

Runways
Direction	Length		Surface
Direction	ft	m	Surface
8/26	5,000	1,524	Asphalt

Statistics (2008)
- Aircraft operations: 17,900
- Based aircraft: 18
- Source: Federal Aviation Administration

Cheraw Municipal Airport (IATA: HCW, ICAO: KCQW, FAA LID: CQW), also known as Lynch Bellinger Field, is a public use airport in Chesterfield County, South Carolina, United States. It is owned by the Town of Cheraw and located three nautical miles (6 km) northwest of its central business district.

Although most U.S. airports use the same three-letter location identifier for the FAA and IATA, this airport is assigned CQW by the FAA and HCW by the IATA.

== Facilities and aircraft ==
The airport covers an area of 235 acres (95 ha) at an elevation of 239 feet (73 m) above mean sea level. It has one runway designated 8/26 with an asphalt surface measuring 5,000 by 75 feet (1,524 x 23 m).

For the 12-month period ending May 1, 2008, the airport had 17,900 aircraft operations, an average of 49 per day: 99% general aviation and 1% military. At that time there were 18 aircraft based at this airport: 16 single-engine, 1 jet and 1 helicopter.

== See also ==
- List of airports in South Carolina
