= Fulbright Act of 1946 =

- Long title: An Act to amend the Surplus Property Act of 1944 to designate the Department of State as the disposal agency for surplus property outside the continental United States, its Territories and possessions, and for other purposes.
- Nicknames: Surplus Property Act Amendment of 1946
- Enacted by: the 79th United States Congress
- Effective: August 1, 1946

Citations
- Public law: Pub. L. 79–584
- Statutes at Large: 60 Stat. 754, Chap. 723

Codification
- Acts amended: Surplus Property Act of 1944
- Titles amended: 50a U.S.C.: War and National Defense
- U.S.C. sections created: 50 Appendix U.S.C. § 1619

Legislative history
- Introduced in the Senate as S. 1636 by J. William Fulbright (D–AR) on November 30, 1945; Passed the Senate on April 12, 1946 (Passed); Passed the House on July 26, 1946 (Passed); Signed into law by President Harry S. Truman on August 1, 1946

Fulbright Act of 1946, 50a U.S.C. § 1619, is a United States statute commissioning the United States Department of State as a disposal agency for the disposal of materials on public lands and the reclamation of salvageable military surplus assets pending the aftermath of World War II. The Act of Congress was an amendment to the Surplus Property Act of 1944 implementing section 1619 entitled designation of disposal agencies.

The statute chronicled in volume sixty of the United States Statutes at Large authorizing the disposal of surplus property abroad coincided with an American initiative known as the Marshall Plan periodically referred to as the Foreign Assistance Act of 1948 and Economic Cooperation Act of 1948.

The Fulbright Act was enacted into law by the 33rd President of the United States Harry Truman during the mid-twentieth century. The foreign educational exchange initiative encompassed the framework of World War II and the origins of the Cold War.

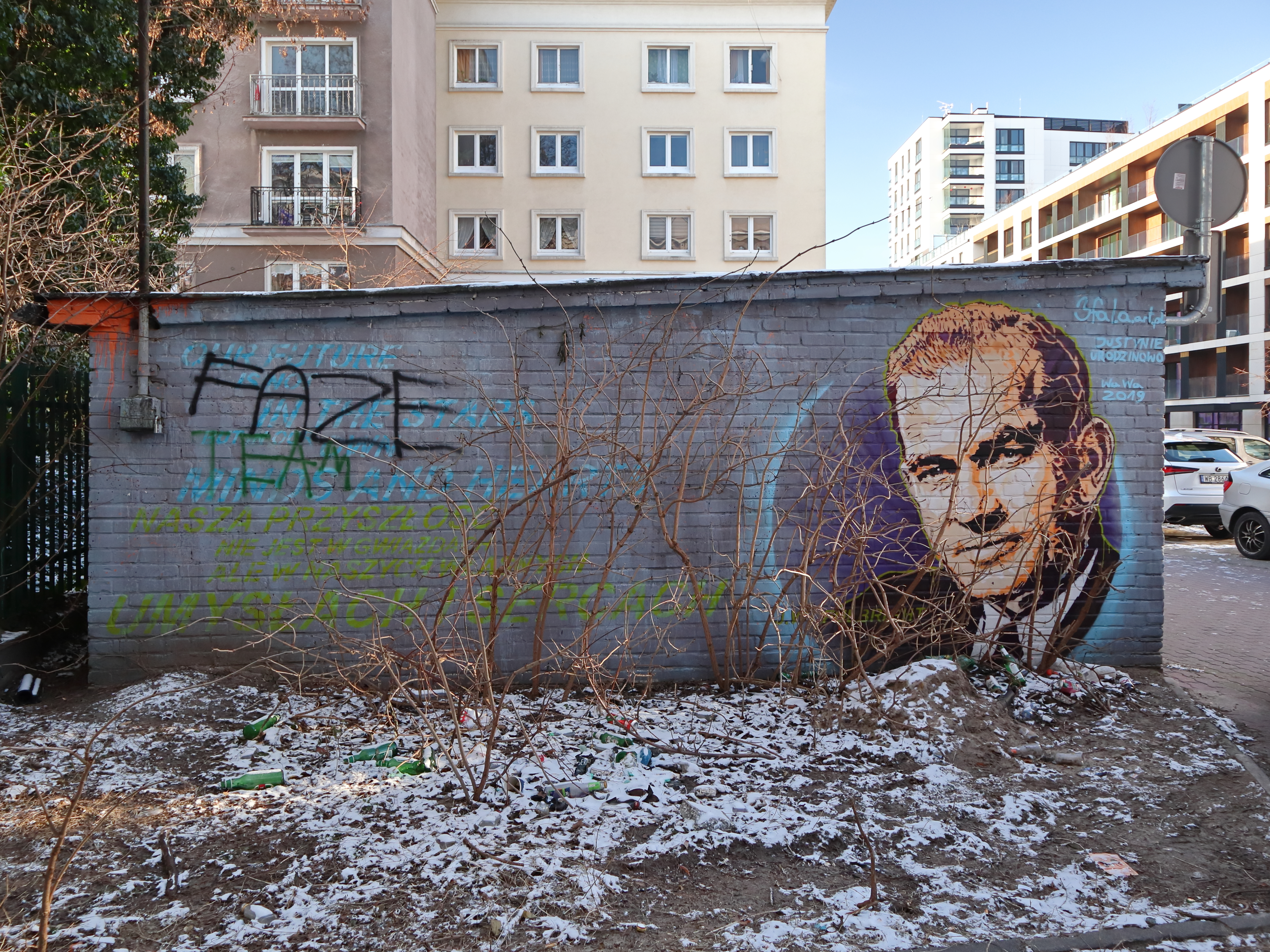
William Fulbright mural at Dzielna Street 15C in Warsaw, Poland

The academic cross-cultural exchange programs persevered the Cold War enduring five decades ―

Cold War (1948–1953)
Cold War (1953–1962)
Cold War (1962–1979)
Cold War (1979–1985)
Cold War (1985–1991)

The Autumn of Nations occurring in 1989 were political demonstrations exemplifying a solidarity movement of nation state while embracing the enlightenment of Glasnost. The civil resistance was revealing by the expiring summer of 1989 with the Pan-European Picnic, divulgement of the Iron Curtain, and the commencement of fall of the Berlin Wall on November 9, 1989.

== Legislative precursor of Surplus Property Act Amendment of 1946 ==
Arkansas Senator James Fulbright presented Senate legislation 1440 to the Committee on Military Affairs on September 27, 1945. The Senate bill S. 1440 was titled as an Act with a House floor narrative regarding credits and potential monetary funds from the transactions of World War II surplus materials. The post-war student exchange programs would secure a dividend or reward proceeds for the furtherance of foreign academic exchange candidates as outlined in the Fulbright narrative;

79th Congressional Session as Senate bill S. 1440

Introduced with the preliminary statute titled as;

An Act authorizing use of credits established through the sale of surplus properties abroad for the promotion of international good will through the exchange of students in the fields of education, culture, and science.

The enactment of this bill will assure that at least a part of the returns from the sale of our surplus materials to foreign countries will accrue to the interest of America. Most of the nations desiring to purchase our trucks, railroad equipment, and so forth, abroad, do not have American dollars, or even the goods, to pay and it will, therefore, be necessary for our Government to establish credits for this purpose. These debts may never be paid in full and might, like the war debts after World War I, become a source of irritation between nations and prevent the orderly reestablishment of trade and commerce and the strengthening of our political relations with other countries.

I do not mean that other countries have any plans to try to cheat our country. It is merely a recognition of the facts as they exist today with regard to the international exchange, and ability to make settlements as between nations. If this bill is approved, the funds will be utilized to exchange students, create a better understanding of our mutual problems, and promote friendly relations, while avoiding possible ill feelings between Nations resulting from inability to meet obligations set up in accordance with traditional methods.

The Surplus Property Administrator has recently indicated that the disposal of surplus property abroad would be placed under the jurisdiction of the Secretary of State, to assure conformity to American foreign policies. The disposition of such funds as may be allocated for this educational fund as proposed in this bill will be in accord with such regulations as may be prescribed by the Secretary of State.

This bill also provides that expenditures shall be made in accordance with the program to be initiated under the Social and Economic Council of the United Nations, under which the proposed educational and cultural organization of the United Nations will be established under the United Nations Charter, so as to coordinate all educational activities in the international field.

A precedent for this program may be found in our action with regard to the indemnity paid this country as a result of the Boxer Rebellion in China in July 1900. By the protocol of September 7, 1901, an indemnity of $333,000,000 was imposed upon China payable to those countries who were involved in the Boxer Rebellion in the preceding year. Of this amount the United States had claimed $25,000,000. This proved more than adequate to indemnify the claims of nationals of the United States and in 1908, approximately $10,000,000 was returned to the Chinese Government. The Chinese Government placed the money in a trust fund for the education of Chinese youth in China and in the United States. The balance of the amount due, slightly over $6,000,000, was remitted by the United States in 1924. These remunerations were made by Senate Joint Resolution 23, May 25, 1908, and House Joint Resolution 248, May 1, 1924.

This act of friendship has had a very great influence in the promotion of the good will and friendly relations that have prevailed between the people of America and the Chinese. I do not think that one can deny that the exchange of students has been one of the most successful of our international policies. The foresight of our Government, nearly 50 years ago, has paid great dividends in our relations with the people of Asia. The good will and understanding created by the exchange of students has been our greatest bulwark against unfriendly criticism of our policies in the Far East. Many students of the Chinese and other Asian peoples agree that our enlightened attitude toward China was our greatest defense to the propaganda of the Japanese in recent years and is to a great extent accountable for the loyalty of these people during the recent war. I think it is reasonable to assume that if a similar program can be intelligently administered among the several nations nese in recent years and is to a great contribution will have been made to the future peace of the world.

— James William Fulbright, United States Senator of Arkansas

79th United States Congress - 1st Session
September 27, 1945

== See also ==
- Agricultural Trade Development & Assistance Act of 1954
- Mutual Security Act
- Fulbright Program
- Office of Alien Property Custodian
- International education
- Roberts Commissions
- Lend-Lease Act of 1941
- Salvage for Victory
- Military Surplus Act of 1920
- Surplus Property Board
- Military Surplus Store
- War Assets Administration
- Monuments, Fine Arts, and Archives program
- World War II reparations
- U.S. statutes & educational exchange programs
  - U.S. Educational Exchange Act, 1948
  - Finnish Educational Exchange Act of 1949
  - China Educational Exchange of 1950
  - Iranian Fiduciary Trust Fund Act of 1950
  - Lacy-Zarubin Agreement of 1958
  - National Defense Education Act, 1958
  - Fulbright–Hays Act of 1961
  - FRIENDSHIP Act of 1993

== Bibliography ==
- Niefeld, S.J.; Mendelsohn, Harold (February 10, 1954). "How Effective Is Our Student-Exchange Program?". Educational Research Bulletin. 33 (2). Taylor & Francis, Ltd.: 29–37. JSTOR 1473612.
- Cook, Donald B.; Smith, J. Paul (1956). "The Philosophy of the Fulbright Programme". International Social Science Bulletin. VIII (4). United Nations Educational, Scientific and Cultural Organization: 615–627 – via UNESCO Digital Library.
- "East-West Exchanges ~ Establishment of a Program of Exchange of Information and Persons with the Soviet Bloc" [Foreign Relations of the United States, 1958–1960, Eastern Europe; Finland; Greece; Turkey, Volume X, Part 2]. Office of the Historian ~ Foreign Service Institute. United States Department of State. 1958.
- Dobney, Fredrick J. (May 1974). "The Evolution of a Reconversion Policy: World War II and Surplus War Property Disposal". The Historian. 36 (3). Taylor & Francis, Ltd.: 498–519. doi:10.1111/j.1540-6563.1974.tb01537.x. JSTOR 24443749.
- "Ten Exchange Students Due in Area". The Chronicles of Oklahoma. Vol. 77, no. 8. Lawton, Oklahoma: Oklahoma Historical Society. The Lawton Constitution. August 16, 1978. p. 3A.
- Tent, James F. (October 1982). "Mission on the Rhine: American Educational Policy in Postwar Germany, 1945-1949". History of Education Quarterly. 22 (3). Cambridge University Press: 255–276. doi:10.2307/367768. JSTOR 367768.
- Daniels, Lee A (June 15, 1988). "Vistas Widen for U.S.-Soviet Student Exchange". Newspaper. Midtown Manhattan, New York: The New York Times.
- Guroff, Gregory (1991). "US.-Soviet Exchange Initiative: Fact Sheet". Rivista di Studi Politici Internazionali. 58 (4 (Ottobre-Dicembre 1991)). Maria Grazia Melchionni: 535–542. JSTOR 42738821.
- Bu, Liping (December 1999). "Educational Exchange and Cultural Diplomacy in the Cold War". Journal of American Studies. 33 (3). Cambridge University Press: 393–415. doi:10.1017/S0021875899006167.
- Füssl, Karl-Heinz (2004). "Between Elitism and Educational Reform - German-American Exchange Programs, 1945-1970". The United States and Germany in the Era of the Cold War, 1945–1990. The United States and Germany in the Era of the Cold War, 1945–1990: A Handbook. Cambridge University Press. pp. 409–416. doi:10.1017/CBO9781139052436.048. ISBN 978-0-521-79112-0.
- Medovoi, Leerom (November 23, 2005). Rebels: Youth and the Cold War Origins of Identity. Durham, North Carolina: Duke University Press. doi:10.1525/phr.2007.76.2.329. ISBN 978-0822387299. OCLC 60349176.
- Osgood, Kenneth A. (February 23, 2006). "Chapter 7. Every Man an Ambassador: Cultural Propaganda and the People-To-People Campaign". Total Cold War: Eisenhower's Secret Propaganda Battle at Home and Abroad. Lawrence, Kansas: University Press of Kansas. pp. 214–252. doi:10.1525/phr.2007.76.2.330. ISBN 978-0700615902. OCLC 61859731 – via People to People International.
- Lebovic, Sam (April 2013). "From War Junk to Educational Exchange: The World War II Origins of the Fulbright Program and the Foundations of American Cultural Globalism, 1945-1950". Diplomatic History. 37 (2). Oxford University Press: 280–312. doi:10.1093/dh/dht002. JSTOR 44254519.
- Scribner, Campbell F. (November 2017). "American Teenagers, Educational Exchange, and Cold War Politics". History of Education Quarterly. 57 (4). History of Education Society: 542–569. doi:10.1017/heq.2017.31.
- Phillips, Timothy (March 7, 2023). Retracing the Iron Curtain [A 3,000-Mile Journey Through the End and Afterlife of the Cold War]. New York City, New York: The Experiment, LLC. ISBN 978-1615199655. OCLC 1356966668.
- Longo, Matthew (November 7, 2023). The Picnic [A Rush for Freedom and the Collapse of Communism]. New York City, New York: W. W. Norton & Company. ISBN 978-0393540789. OCLC 1473576798.

== The Campaign of Truth and Truman Administration International Information Policy ==
- "Address on Foreign Policy at a Luncheon of the American Society of Newspaper Editors" ["The Campaign of Truth" ~ Harry Truman International Information Policy of Post World War II]. Internet Archive. U.S. National Archives and Records Service. April 20, 1950. pp. 260–264.
- "Letter to Senator Flanders on the Appropriation for the Campaign of Truth". Internet Archive. U.S. National Archives and Records Service. August 30, 1950. pp. 602–603.
- "Letter to the Chairman, Board of Foreign Scholarships, on the Fulbright Program". Internet Archive. U.S. National Archives and Records Service. May 11, 1951. pp. 277–278.
- "Launching the Campaign of Truth; Second Phase" [Seventh Semiannual Report of the Secretary of State to Congress on the International Information and Educational Exchange Program, January 1 to June 30, 1951]. Department of State, Division of Publications ~ Office of Public Affairs. United States Department of State. January 1952. OCLC 35406678 – via Hathitrust Digital Library.
- Compton, Wilson Martindale (July 1952). "Waging the Campaign of Truth" [Reprinted from the Department of State Field Reporter of July-August 1952]. Hathitrust Digital Library. United States Department of State. OCLC 9140385.

== Resources of U.S. federal organizations ==
- U.S. Department of State (1966). "ERIC ED019026: International Educational Exchange ~ The Opening Decades 1946-1966" [A Report of the Board of Foreign Scholarships]. Internet Archive. U.S. Department of Health, Education, and Welfare – via Education Resources Information Center.
- U.S. Department of State (April 1966). "ERIC ED019027: Fact Sheet on the International Educational Exchange Program ~ 1946-1966". Internet Archive. U.S. Department of Health, Education, and Welfare – via Education Resources Information Center (ERIC) Archive.
- Byers, Philip P. (June 1972). "ERIC ED089592: The German-American Conference on Educational Exchange". Internet Archive. U.S. Department of Health, Education, and Welfare – via Education Resources Information Center.
