= China Educational Exchange of 1950 =

Cultural-exchange program with the U.S.

The China Educational Exchange of 1950 was a cross-cultural program authorized during the 81st United States Congress by unanimous consent of the United States House of Representatives in Bill 7797, the Foreign Economic Assistance Act of 1950. The bill was an amendment to the Foreign Assistance Act of 1948 and Economic Cooperation Act of 1948, often known as the Marshall Plan.

== Background ==
On June 24, 1949, United States President Harry Truman recommended to the 81st United States Congress a Point Four Program encompassing aid to developing countries (Second World and Third World nations) after World War II. On March 25 of the following year, Truman urged Congress for unanimous consent of the Foreign Assistance Act for underdeveloped countries confronting direct aggression, intimidation, and subversion while sustaining economic and political stability. The act, supporting five foreign-aid programs, was signed into law by the president on June 5, 1950.

== Context ==
The China Educational Exchange of 1950 originated in the China Aid Act of 1948 under Title IV of the Marshall Plan. The 1950 China educational exchange program was articulated by the China Area Aid Act of 1950, assimilated in Title II of the Foreign Economic Assistance Act of 1950:

Title II - Aid to China ~ 64 Stat. 202-203 § 202, Chapter 220

Allocations for Tuition, etc.

That not more than $6,000,000 of such funds (excluding the amounts mentioned in the foregoing provisos), shall be available for allocation to the Secretary of State, to remain available until expended, under such regulations as the Secretary of State may prescribe, using private agencies to the maximum extent practicable, for necessary expenses of tuition, subsistence, transportation, and emergency medical care for selected citizens of China for study or teaching in accredited colleges, universities, or other educational institutions in the United States approved by the Secretary of State for the purposes, or for research and related academic and technical activities in the United States, and the Attorney General is hereby authorized and directed to promulgate regulations providing that such selected citizens of China who have been admitted for the purpose of study in the United States, shall be granted permission to accept employment upon application filed with the Commissioner of Immigration and Naturalization.

— John Kee, U.S. Representative from West Virginia, 22 U.S.C. ch. 19, subch. III §§ 1541–1547, June 5, 1950

== 1979 and 1984 China cultural-exchange agreements ==
The United States endorsed agreements for cultural diplomacy with China during the Carter and Reagan administrations. U.S. president Jimmy Carter and Chinese paramount leader Deng Xiaoping met on January 31, 1979, in Washington, D.C. and signed a cultural agreement between their countries.

President Ronald Reagan made a state visit to China from April 26 to May 1, 1984. He and Premier Zhao Ziyang met in Beijing, signing the United States-China Accord for Cultural Exchange on April 30, 1984. The state reception was last held during the 1972 visit by Richard Nixon to China on February 21 to February 28 of that year. The academic student exchange program remained strong during the five decades of the Cold War.

== See also ==
- Chinese Civil War
- Chinese Communist Revolution
- Cold War in Asia
- Republic of China (1912–1949)
- Republic of Formosa
- Sino-Soviet relations
- Taiwan Strait
- US–China Education Trust
  - U.S. statutes and educational exchange programs:
    - Fulbright Act of 1946
    - U.S. Educational Exchange Act, 1948
    - Finnish Educational Exchange Act of 1949
    - Iranian Fiduciary Trust Fund Act of 1950
    - Fulbright–Hays Act of 1961
    - FRIENDSHIP Act of 1993

== Archival documents of U.S. Department of State ==
- "The Chinese Revolution of 1949" [Milestones in the History of U.S. Foreign Relations: 1945–1952]. Office of the Historian ~ Foreign Service Institute. United States Department of State.
- "United States Relations with China, with Special Reference to the Period 1944-1949" [Based on the files of the Department of State]. HathiTrust Digital Library. Its Publication3573Far Eastern series,30. Washington, D.C.: U.S. Government Printing Office. August 1949.
- "Point Four" [Cooperative Program for Aid in the Development of Economically Underdeveloped Areas]. HathiTrust Digital Library. Washington, D.C.: United States Department of State. November 1949.
- "Point Four" [Cooperative Program for Aid in the Development of Economically Underdeveloped Areas]. HathiTrust Digital Library. Washington, D.C.: U.S. Government Printing Office. January 1950.
- "Legislative Background of Point Four Program" [Memorandum Prepared in the Department of State]. Office of the Historian ~ Foreign Service Institute. Foreign Relations of the United States, 1950, National Security Affairs; Foreign Economic Policy, Volume I, Document 304. United States Department of State. June 20, 1950.
- "203. Joint Statement Following Discussions With Leaders of the People's Republic of China". Office of the Historian ~ Foreign Service Institute. Foreign Relations of the United States, 1969–1976, Volume XVII, China, 1969–1972. United States Department of State. February 27, 1972.
- "Rapprochement with China, 1972" [Milestones: 1969–1976]. Office of the Historian ~ Foreign Service Institute. United States Department of State. 1972.
- "International Educational & Cultural Exchange: A Human Contribution to the Structure of Peace". HathiTrust Digital Library. Washington, D.C.: U.S. Government Printing Office. Bureau of Educational and Cultural Affairs ~ U.S. Department of State. 1974. p. 7.
- Fairbank, Wilma (June 1976). "America's Cultural Experiment in China 1942-1949" [Cultural Relations Programs of the U.S. Department of State ~ Historical Studies: Number 1]. HathiTrust Digital Library. International information and cultural series; 108. Washington, D.C.: U.S. Government Printing Office.
- "Cultural Relations: Agreement Between the United States of America and the People's Republic of China, Signed at Washington January 31, 1979". HathiTrust Digital Library. Treaties and other international acts series; 9178. Washington, D.C.: U.S. Government Printing Office. United States Department of State. January 1979.

== Bibliography ==
- Feis, Herbert (1953). China Tangle: The American Effort in China from Pearl Harbor to the Marshall Mission. Vol. 1773. Princeton, New Jersey: Princeton University Press. ISBN 978-1400868278. JSTOR j.ctt13x0zrg. OCLC 905862914.
- Li, Hongshan (2008). U.S. - China Educational Exchange: State, Society, and Intercultural Relations, 1905-1950. New Brunswick, New Jersey: Rutgers University Press. ISBN 978-0813543925. JSTOR j.ctt5hj1g5. OCLC 85783332.
