= Finnish Educational Exchange Act of 1949 =

U.S. statute supporting war reparations for Finland

- Long title: An Act to provide that any future payments by the Republic of Finland on the principal or interest of its debt of the First World War to the United States shall be used to provide educational and technical instruction and training in the United States for citizens of Finland and American books and technical equipment for institutions of higher education in Finland, and to provide opportunities for American citizens to carry out academic and scientific enterprises in Finland.
- Acronyms (colloquial): FEEA
- Enacted by: the 81st United States Congress
- Effective: August 24, 1949

Citations
- Public law: Pub. L. 81–265
- Statutes at Large: 63 Stat. 630, Chap. 505

Legislative history
- Introduced in the Senate as S.J.Res. 3 by J. William Fulbright (D–AR) on July 21, 1949; Signed into law by President Harry S. Truman on August 24, 1949

Finnish Educational Exchange Act of 1949 is a United States statute supporting an accord for war reparations acquired by the Republic of Finland during the Finnish Civil War and World War I. The Act of Congress authorized the collection of future reparation payments by Finland to be reserved in a depository institution or special deposit account administered by the United States Department of the Treasury. The financial endowment was to be available and governed by the United States Department of State. The Finland academic exchange endowment procured financing for the furtherance of academic instruction and studies, educational activities, and technical training as a collaborative pursuit by Republic of Finland and the United States.

Arkansas Senator James Fulbright endorsed the senatorial conditions for the Fulbright Act of 1946 during September 1945, establishing the preliminary progressive elements for foreign academic exchange programs. The eighty-first Senate joint resolution was sponsored by Senator Fulbright serving as a benefactor for student exchange programs at the crest of the post-war interval in light of the aftermath of World War II and Finland in World War II.

The implementation of the Fulbright Program in Finland has since been looked upon as an example of successful cultural diplomacy, leading to the exchange of Finnish-American globalization following the end of the Cold War.

== Origin of Finnish Educational Exchange Act ==
In 1922, United States government established a World War Foreign Debts Commission by the 67th United States Congress passage of the World War Foreign Debts Commission Act. The Commission was authorized to mediate agreements and terms of World War I government debt sustained by foreign governments obligated to the United States of America.

In 1924, the 68th United States Congress passed House bill 5557 entitled the Finland Settlement of World War I Indebtedness. The Act of Congress encompassed the defining of terms regarding the funding, payment installments, and rates of interest for World War I reparations as commitments accrued by the Republic of Finland.

== Declarations of the Act ==
The Finnish Educational Exchange Act was penned as three sections supporting the auspices for financial funding while incorporating applicable provisions of the United States Educational Exchange Act of 1948.

| 63 STAT 630 § 1 | Finland use of future war debt payments for foreign academic exchange programs |
| 63 STAT 630 § 1 | Availability and provision of financial funds for Finnish educational exchange program |
| 63 STAT 630 § 2 | U.S. Department of State authorized in accordance with applicable provisions of the United States Educational Exchange Act of 1948 |
| 63 STAT 630 § 3 | Special deposit account disbursements made by the Division of Disbursement of the Treasury Department as vouchers certified by U.S. Department of State |

== See also ==
- Council on International Educational Exchange
- Student and Exchange Visitor Program
- United States Cultural Exchange Programs
- United States Information Agency
- World Festival of Youth and Students
- Youth For Understanding

U.S. statutes & educational exchange programs

- Lacy-Zarubin Agreement of 1958
- National Defense Education Act, 1958
- Fulbright–Hays Act of 1961
- FRIENDSHIP Act of 1993

Early twentieth century & political state of Finland

- February Revolution of 1917
- October Revolution of 1917
- Finland Station
- Tampere conference of 1905
- Grand Duchy of Finland
- Tampere Lenin Museum

== Archival documents of U.S. Department of State ==
- "All Educational Exchange Activities from July 1 to December 31, 1948" [Dilemma Considerations with Educational Exchange in Eastern Europe]. 1949 First Report, U.S. Advisory Commission on Educational Exchange. U.S. Department of State ~ U.S. Advisory Commission on Public Diplomacy. United States Government Printing Office: 8, 12–15. February 7, 1949.
- "Department of State Policy Statement: Finland". Office of the Historian ~ Foreign Service Institute. Foreign Relations of the United States, 1949, Eastern Europe; The Soviet Union, Volume V, Document 269. United States Department of State. December 1, 1949.
- "Finnish War-Debt Program". 1950 Second Report, U.S. Advisory Commission on Educational Exchange. U.S. Department of State ~ U.S. Advisory Commission on Public Diplomacy. United States Government Printing Office: 2, 11. January 3, 1950.
- "The Department of State's Conduct of the Finnish Program". 1951 Fifth Report, U.S. Advisory Commission on Educational Exchange. U.S. Department of State ~ U.S. Advisory Commission on Public Diplomacy. United States Government Printing Office: 2, 6, 8–9. April 6, 1951.
- "Paper Prepared in the Department of State: Finland ~ Guidelines of U.S. Policy and Operations". Office of the Historian ~ Foreign Service Institute. Foreign Relations of the United States, 1961–1963, Volume XVI, Eastern Europe; Cyprus; Greece; Turkey, Document 240. United States Department of State. January 1963.

== Presidential statements of Harry Truman ==
- "Address on Foreign Policy at a Luncheon of the American Society of Newspaper Editors". Public Papers of the Presidents of the United States - Harry S. Truman. U.S. National Archives and Records Service. April 20, 1950. pp. 260–264.
- "Letter to Senator Flanders on the Appropriation for the Campaign of Truth". Internet Archive. U.S. National Archives and Records Service. August 30, 1950. pp. 602–603.
- "Letter to the Chairman, Board of Foreign Scholarships, on the Fulbright Program". Internet Archive. U.S. National Archives and Records Service. May 11, 1951. pp. 277–278.

== Informational resources ==
- UNESCO International Bureau of Education (1949). "Finland ~ Educational Developments in 1947-1948". International Yearbook of Education, 1948. 10. United Nations Educational, Scientific and Cultural Organization: 151–153.
- Niefeld, S.J.; Mendelsohn, Harold (February 10, 1954). "How Effective Is Our Student-Exchange Program?". Educational Research Bulletin. 33 (2). Taylor & Francis, Ltd.: 29–37. JSTOR 1473612.
- "East-West Exchanges ~ Establishment of a Program of Exchange of Information and Persons with the Soviet Bloc" [Foreign Relations of the United States, 1958–1960, Eastern Europe; Finland; Greece; Turkey, Volume X, Part 2]. Office of the Historian ~ Foreign Service Institute. United States Department of State. 1958.
- Pyykkŏnen, Maija-Liisa (March 1973). "ERIC ED088782: About the Finnish Educational System". U.S. Department of Health, Education, and Welfare – via Education Resources Information Center.
- "Ten Exchange Students Due in Area". The Chronicles of Oklahoma. Vol. 77, no. 8. Lawton, Oklahoma: Oklahoma Historical Society. The Lawton Constitution. August 16, 1978. p. 3A.
- Daniels, Lee A (June 15, 1988). "Vistas Widen for U.S.-Soviet Student Exchange". The New York Times. Midtown Manhattan, New York.
- Bu, Liping (December 1999). "Educational Exchange and Cultural Diplomacy in the Cold War". Journal of American Studies. 33 (3). Cambridge University Press: 393–415. doi:10.1017/S0021875899006167.
- Mäkinen, Ilkka (2001). "Finland Pays Its Debts and Gets Books in Return: ASLA Grants to the Finnish Academic Libraries, 1950-1967" [Books, Libraries, Reading, and Publishing in the Cold War, Winter 2001]. Libraries & Culture. 36 (1). University of Texas Press: 211–232. doi:10.1353/lac.2001.0013. JSTOR 25548904.
- Richmond, Yale (August 9, 2007). Cultural Exchange and the Cold War: Raising the Iron Curtain. University Park, Pennsylvania: Penn State Press. doi:10.1515/9780271031576. ISBN 978-0271046679. OCLC 64301099.
- Lebovic, Sam (April 2013). "From War Junk to Educational Exchange: The World War II Origins of the Fulbright Program and the Foundations of American Cultural Globalism, 1945-1950". Diplomatic History. 37 (2). Oxford University Press: 280–312. doi:10.1093/dh/dht002. JSTOR 44254519.
- Scribner, Campbell F. (November 2017). "American Teenagers, Educational Exchange, and Cold War Politics". History of Education Quarterly. 57 (4). History of Education Society: 542–569. doi:10.1017/heq.2017.31.
