= Surplus store =

Business that sells excess supply

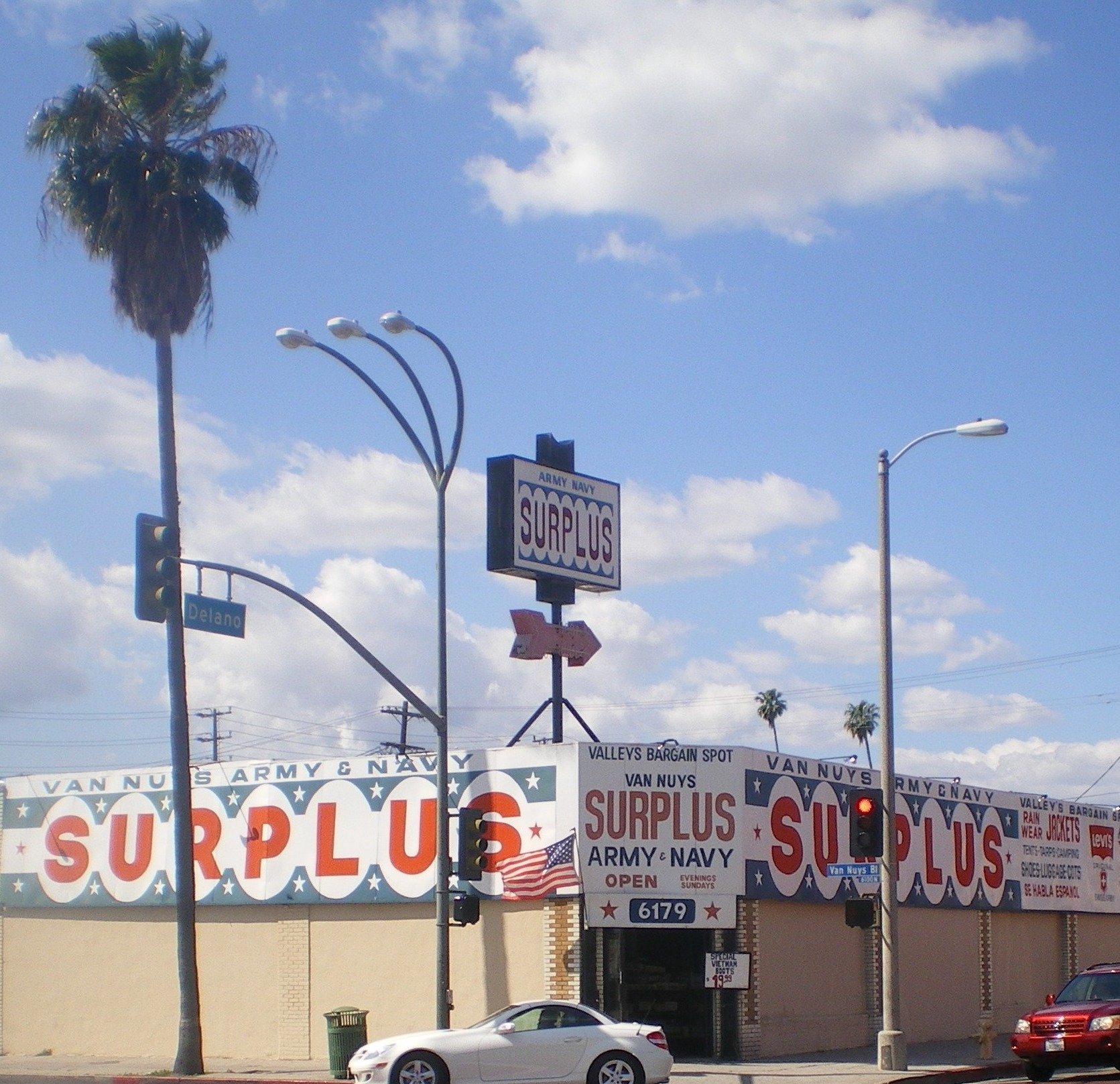
The Van Nuys Army & Navy Surplus Store, a former surplus store in Los Angeles, California, United States

A surplus store or disposals store is a business that sells items and goods that are used, purchased but unused, or past their use by date, and are no longer needed due to excess supply, decommissioning, or obsolescence. The surplus sold is often military, government, or industrial goods.

== Terminology ==
A store that sells military or government goods is usually called a military surplus store, government surplus store, war surplus store, or army-navy store.

== Military surplus ==
Military surplus stores sell equipment that was intended for the military but is unable to be used, no longer in service, or originally purchased in excess by the military. These stores often sell camping equipment or military clothing. Large amounts of former military clothing and equipment were sold in these stores after World War I and World War II.

=== By country ===
==== Canada ====
Known as army surplus stores, these typically also carry sporting goods related to hunting, fishing, and camping.

==== China ====
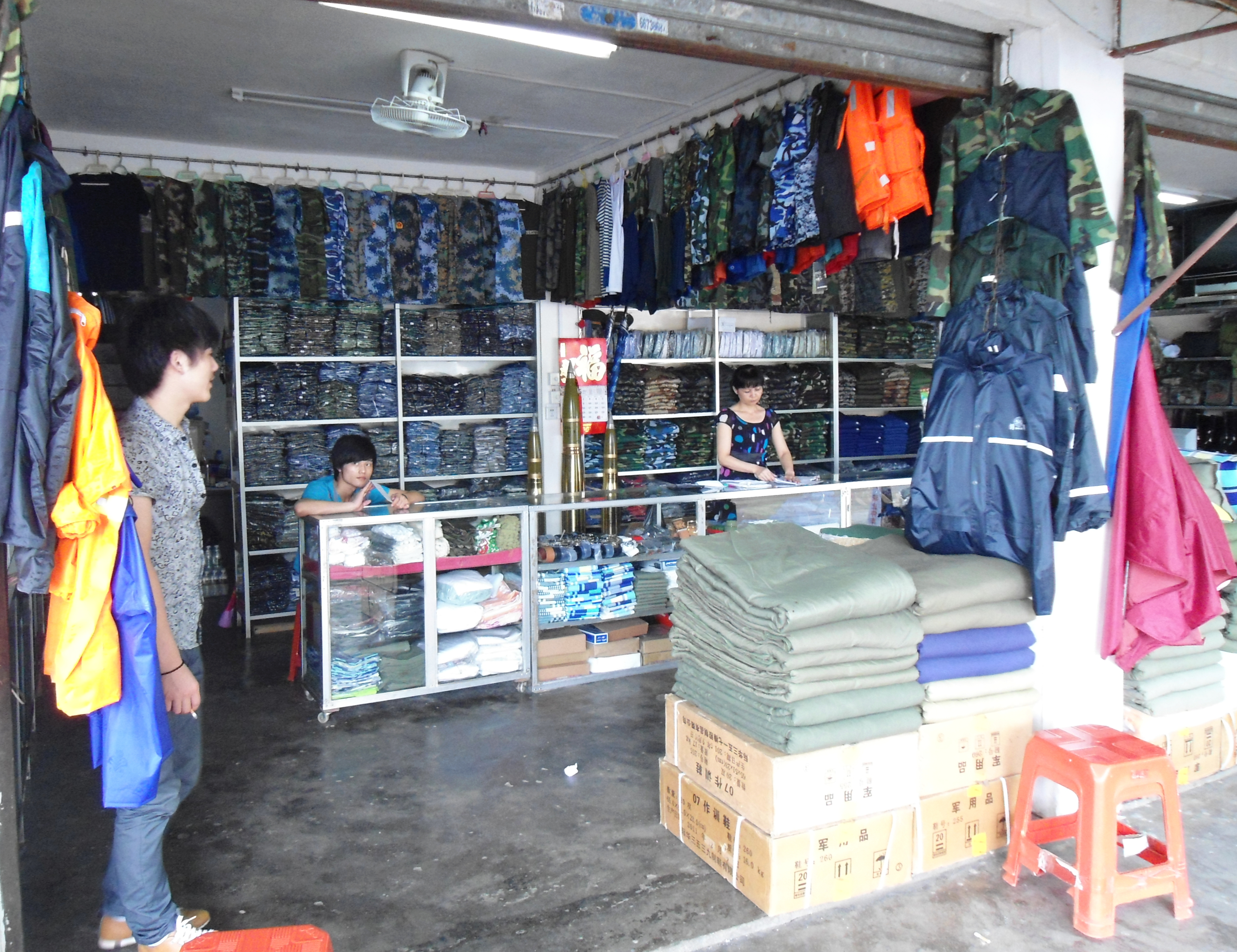
An army surplus store in Haikou, Hainan Province, China

Army surplus stores in China are common. They mostly specialize in clothing, footwear, tarpaulins, and blankets, but also often sell occupational safety equipment.

==== Germany ====
In Allied-occupied Germany, the Allies initially confiscated the stock and materials of the Wehrmacht, including 500,000 tonnes of stock and over 150,000 tonnes of scrap. In 1948 a government agency, the Staatliche Erfassungsgesellschaft für öffentliches Gut ("State Collecting Company for Public Good", StEG), was formed to manage the sale of these items. In reference to the name of this agency, the army surplus was called Stegware, and their stores were nicknamed "Steg shops". Goods sold by these stores included new and used clothing, camping equipment, and tools; early on, vehicles and heavier equipment were also sold. In the early 1950s the U.S. military began to add their own surplus from the war. The joint surplus was sold across Germany until the 1980s.

==== United States ====
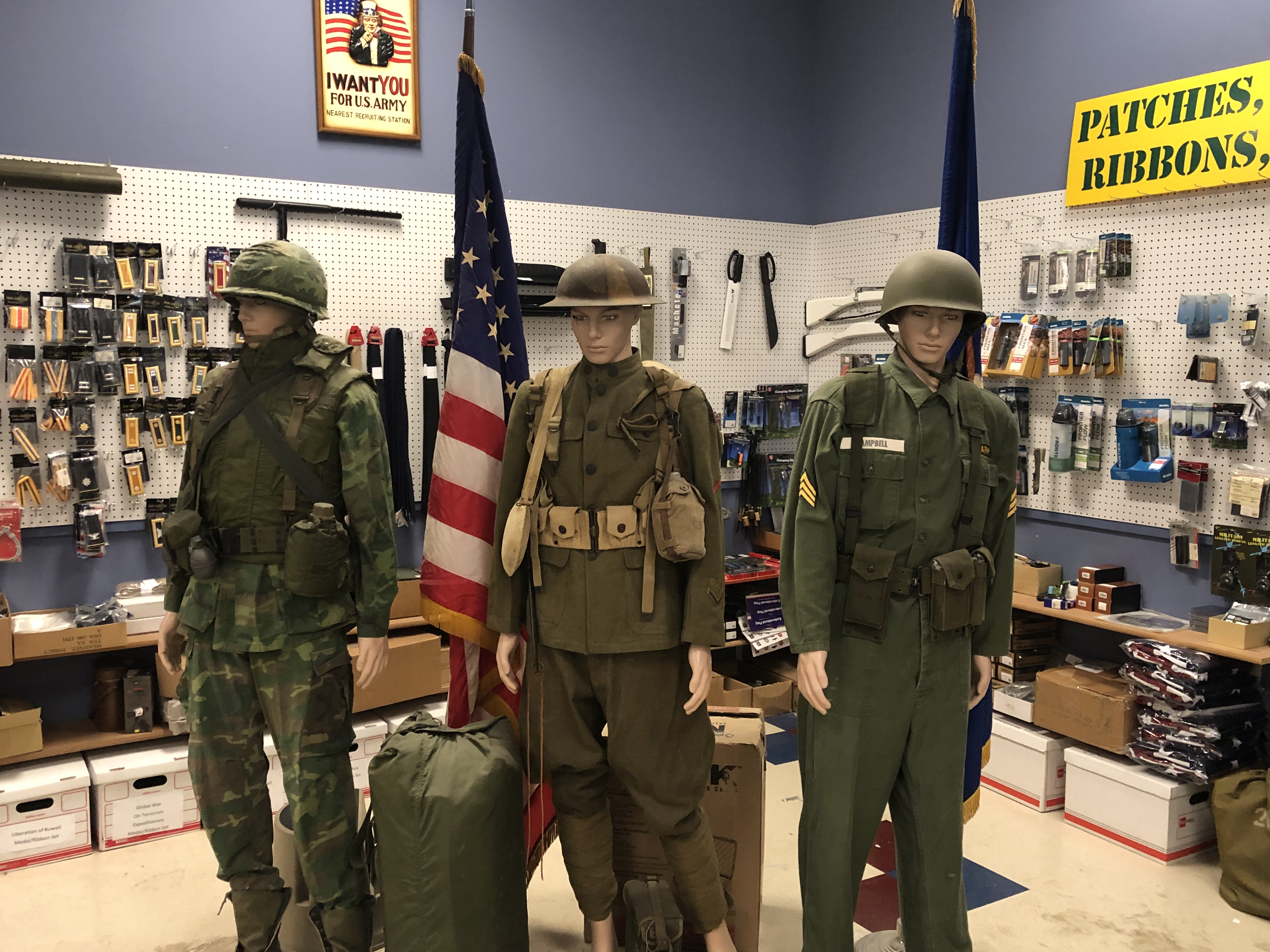
Military uniforms displayed at an Army Navy Warehouse surplus store in the United States

Known as military surplus stores or army navy stores, surplus stores in the U.S. typically carry military or military-spec equipment. After the World Wars and Vietnam War, large amounts of military surplus was left over from the large amounts of equipment made for drafted troops, making their stock and sale common. However, with the advent of the military being volunteer and the fighting force being smaller, most modern military stores have had to switch to selling "military-spec" items, which are civilian remakes of military items.

== See also ==
- Diminishing manufacturing sources and material shortages
- Military Surplus Act (Kahn–Wadsworth Act)
- Performance-based logistics
- Spare part
- Surplus Property Act
- Radio Row
- Business cluster
- Entrepreneurial ecosystem
