= Law Enforcement Support Office =

U.S. Department of Defense division and program transferring military equipment to police

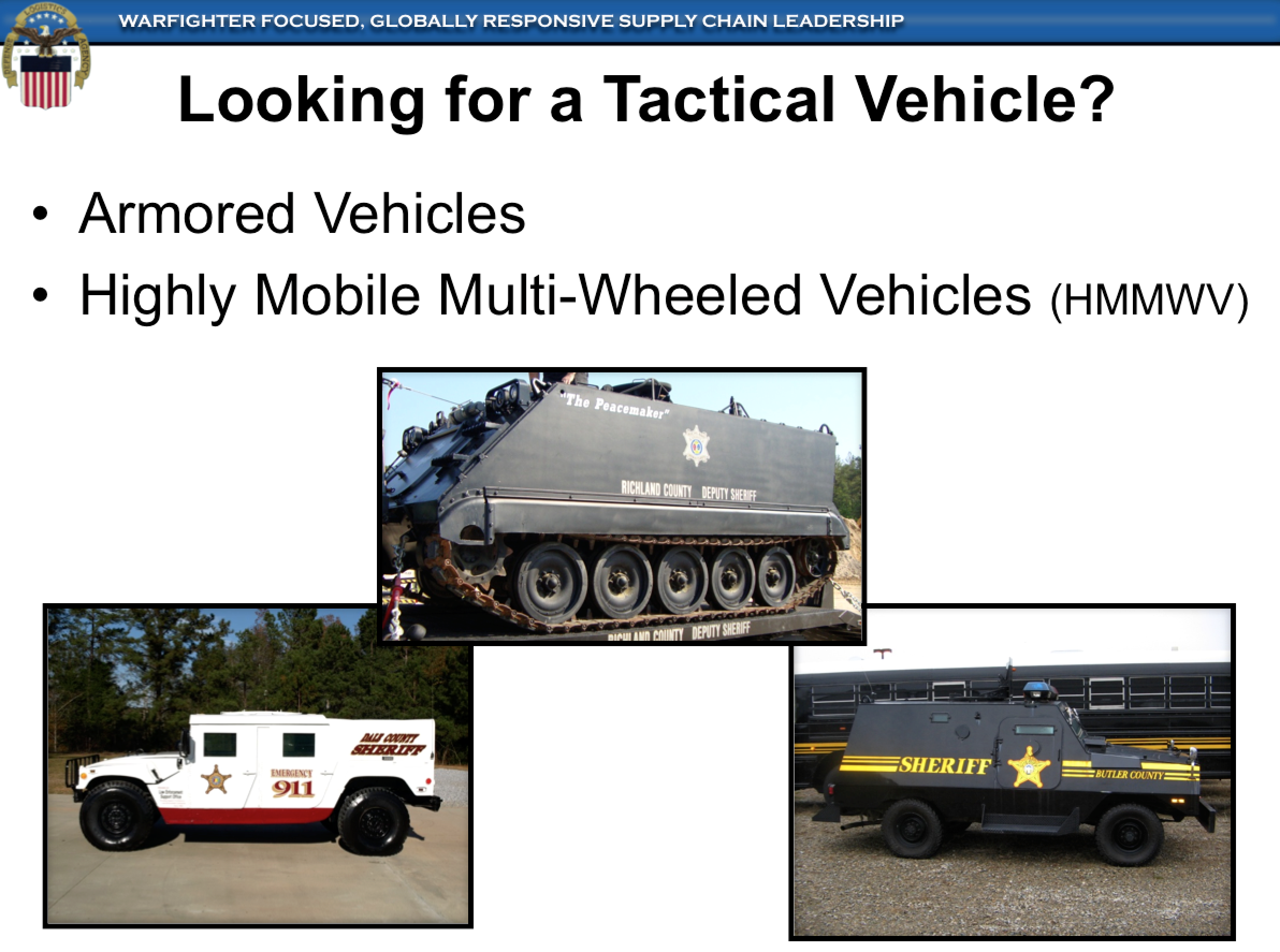
Slide from a Defense Logistics Agency brochure promoting the 1033 Program's military vehicle offerings. Pictured in the slide are a Humvee (Dale County Sheriff's Office), an M113 APC (Richland County Sheriff's Department), and a Cadillac Gage Ranger (Butler County Sheriff's Office).

The Law Enforcement Support Office (LESO) is a division under the United States Department of Defense (DoD) responsible for managing the "1033 Program", which transfers excess weapons, equipment, and vehicles from the United States Armed Forces to civilian law enforcement agencies. The program legally requires the DoD to make various items of equipment available to local law enforcement, ranging from supplies to materiel.

LESO is a division of DLA Disposition Services, which is a subordinate command of the Defense Logistics Agency (DLA), which is itself a division of the DoD.

Precedent legislation of the 1033 Program's concept has existed since the end of World War II. The modern program arose in 1990, when the U.S. federal government permitted the transfer of DoD resources to law enforcement for drug enforcement purposes. In 1997, usage was expanded into other areas, including counterterrorism.

As of 2020, 8,200 local law enforcement agencies have participated in the 1033 Program, which has transferred $5.1 billion in military material from the DoD to law enforcement agencies since 1997. According to the DLA, material worth $449 million was transferred in 2013 alone. Though most media attention is placed on the materiel acquired from the 1033 Program—such as service weapons, ammunition, body armor, and armored vehicles—the items most commonly requested by law enforcement through the program include clothing, flashlights, medical supplies, sandbags, sleeping bags, and electrical wiring.

LESO and the 1033 Program have been criticized by the media, the ACLU, and the NAACP out of police militarization concerns; by American citizens following the use of 1033 Program equipment during the Ferguson unrest; by the DoD Office of Inspector General in 2003; and by the U.S. Government Accountability Office, which uncovered mismanagement within LESO. Proponents of the program argue the equipment acquired from LESO protect police officers and civilians, may be necessary at any time in the event of a terrorist attack or mass shooting, and are not heavy military weaponry such as armed combat vehicles.

== History ==
=== Predecessor ===
The 1944 Surplus Property Act provided for the disposal of surplus government property. To deal with these disposals, numerous short-lived agencies were formed, such as the Surplus War Property Administration in the Office of War Mobilization (February – October 1944); the Surplus Property Board in the Office of War Mobilization and Reconversion (October 1944 – September 1945); and the Surplus Property Administration; as well as corporations like the Petroleum Reserves Corporation and the War Assets Corporation. The War Assets Administration was the latest to operate and was abolished in 1949, when the Surplus Property Act was repealed.

=== Establishment ===
The predecessor of the 1033 Program was created in 1990 under the administration of President George H. W. Bush. The program was named the "1208 Program", after section 1208 of the National Defense Authorization Act for Fiscal Years 1990 and 1991, (Note: Pub. L. 101–189, H.R. 2461, 103 Stat. 1352, enacted November 29, 1989.) which outlined the program's use and authorized the transfer of military hardware from the DoD broadly to "federal and state agencies", but specifically "for use in counter-drug activities", as the legislation was passed in the context of the war on drugs.

In 1995, the Law Enforcement Support Office was created within the DLA to work exclusively with law enforcement.

Under President Bill Clinton, with the passage of the National Defense Authorization Act for Fiscal Year 1997, (Note: Pub. L. 104–201 (text) (PDF), H.R. 3230, 110 Stat. 2639, enacted September 23, 1996.) the 1208 Program was expanded to the 1033 Program. Section 1033 of the act amended 10 U.S.C. § 2576(a) to allow the DoD to transfer "property... including small arms and ammunition... suitable for use by the agencies in law enforcement activities, including counter-drug and counter-terrorism activities", noting that "preference is given to counter-drug and counter-terrorism requests". It was signed into law by President Bill Clinton on 23 September 1996.

=== Limitations ===
In October 2014, the DLA Disposition Services first released information about the equipment distribution by county, in the wake of public scrutiny following reports that the Ferguson Police Department used materiel acquired from the 1033 Program during the Ferguson unrest. Federal records on the movement of military equipment to police were released to the public on 21 November 2014.

In May 2015, President Barack Obama signed Executive Order 13688, limiting and prohibiting the transfer of certain types of weapons and equipment to law enforcement agencies through the 1033 Program, including large-caliber weaponry, tracked armored vehicles, grenade launchers, and camouflage.

On 28 August 2017, President Donald Trump rolled back Executive Order 13688, effective immediately. Attorney General Jeff Sessions announced the move at the Fraternal Order of Police (FOP) convention in Nashville, Tennessee, and said the president would do so by executive order.

On 25 May 2022, President Joe Biden issued Executive Order 14074, addressing police reform. Section 12 prohibited or limited to specific uses the transfer of a number of military items, including firearms of .50 caliber or greater, silencers, bayonets, vehicles without a commercial application, explosives, weaponized drones, and long-range acoustic devices. The order also increased application and certification requirements for law enforcement agencies seeking materiel. Section 12 applied to the 1033 Program and other federal equipment transfer programs.

== Overview ==
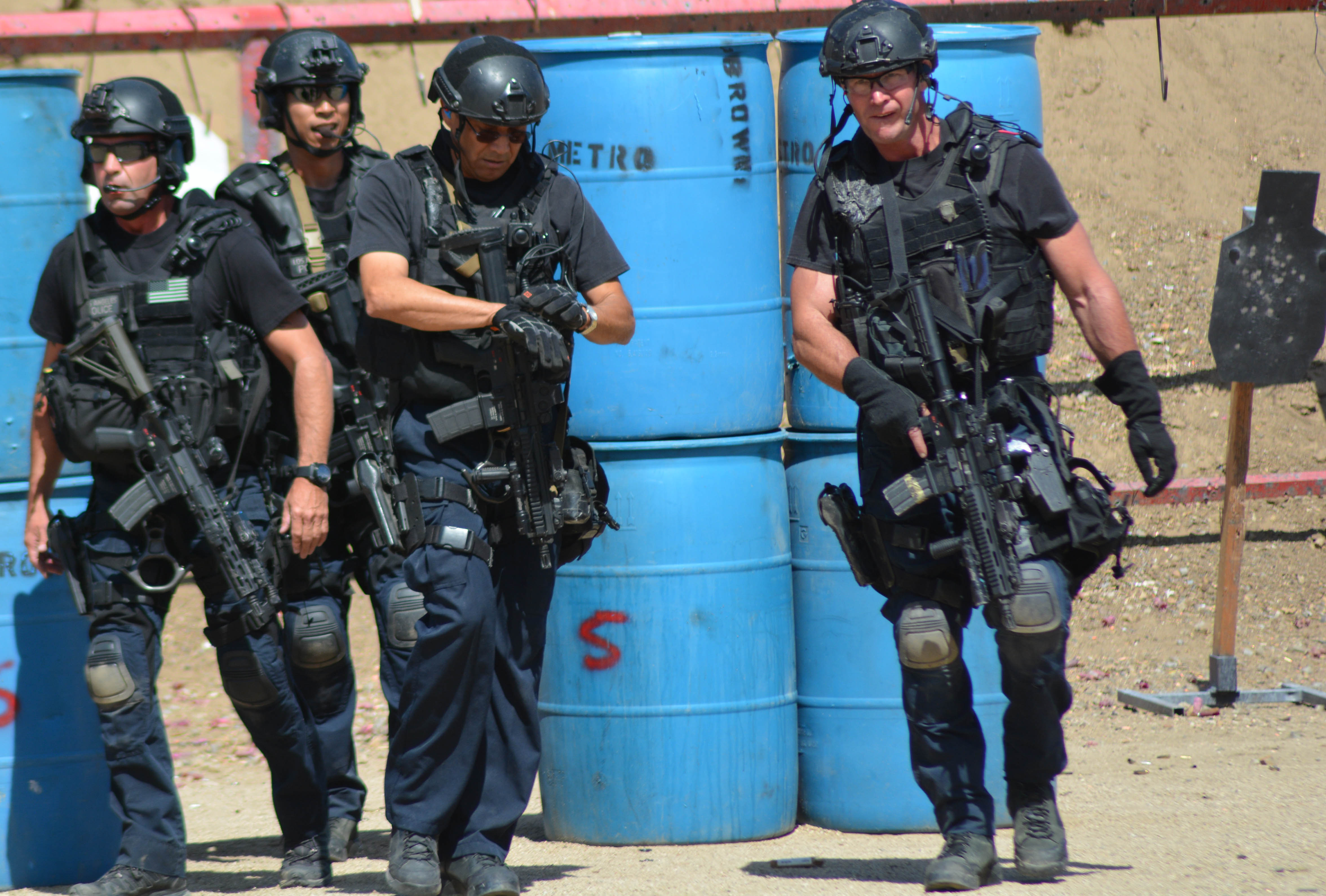
Los Angeles Police Department SWAT officers with military equipment during training

DLA Disposition Services helps the DoD dispose of its "excess property... from air conditioners to vehicles, clothing to computers" via "transfer to other federal agencies, or donation to state and local governments and other qualified organizations", as well as by "sale of surplus property". Availability of surplus equipment has been facilitated by the reduced American presence in Iraq and Afghanistan.

According to LESO, from 1997 until 2014, $5.1 billion in military hardware was transferred from the DoD to local American law enforcement agencies, with materiel worth $449 million transferred in 2013 alone. About a third of the offered equipment was new. As of 2022, the total value of transfers since 1990 was $7.1 billion, based on original acquisition value, not accounting for depreciation of used items.

The most commonly obtained item from the 1033 Program is ammunition. Also commonly requested are supplies and non-combat equipment, including clothing, sandbags, medical supplies, sleeping bags, flashlights, containers, generators, and electrical wiring. The program offers a variety of military weapons and equipment to police, ranging from handguns and bulletproof vests to assault rifles and high-caliber firearms. Among the military weapons (as highlighted by media) are bayonets and grenade launchers; however, according to the DoD, the bayonets are repurposed as utility knives, while the grenade launchers use tear gas and smoke grenades instead of explosive rounds, and were no longer made available as of 1999. Vehicle offerings include light utility vehicles, MRAPs, armored personnel carriers, trucks, and various types of aircraft and watercraft.

Under the program, equipment is designated as either controlled or non-controlled property. Controlled property comprises military items, including weapons, and is supplied on a conditional basis; ownership remains with the DoD, and property must be returned when no longer in use. Non-controlled property, also known as general property, includes items like office equipment, first aid kits, and sleeping bags, and becomes the public property of the receiving agency. In 2019, non-controlled property accounted for 92% of transfers.

=== Police departments ===
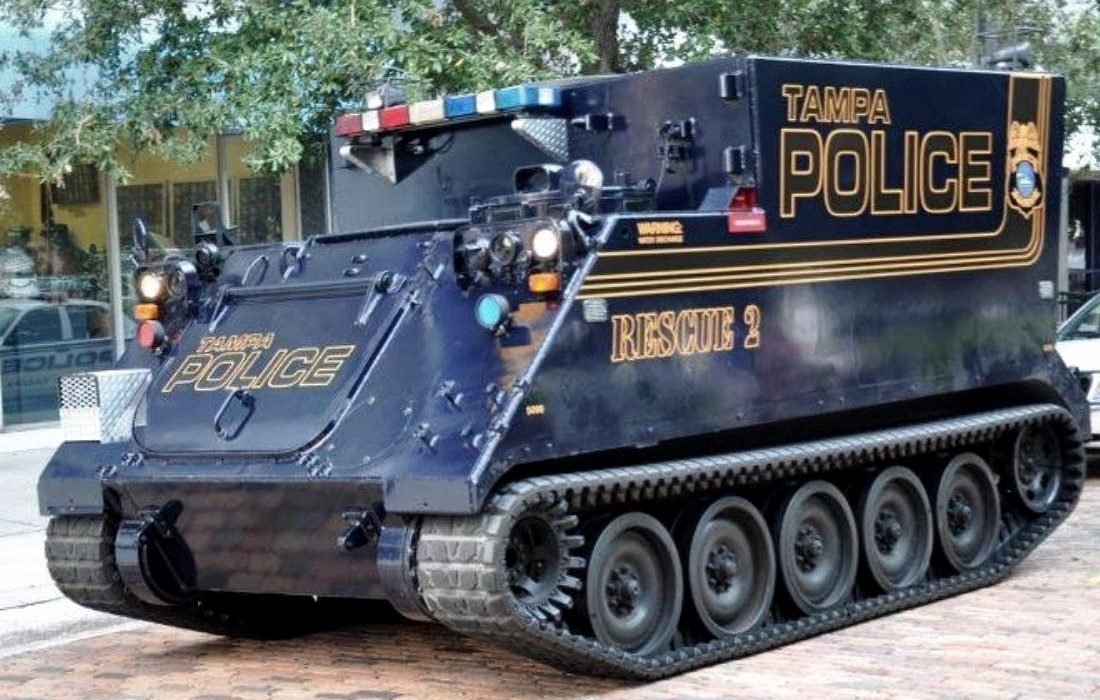
M577 command post carrier used by the Tampa Police Department in Florida

As of 2014, 8,000 law enforcement agencies participate in the 1033 Program. Police departments are responsible for paying for shipment and storage of material acquired, but do not pay for the donation. The largest number of requests come from small to mid-sized police departments who are unable to afford extra clothing, vehicles, and weapons. The program gives smaller police departments access to material that larger police departments are usually able to afford without federal assistance. A memorandum of agreement between the DLA and the states participating in the program requires that police either use their received equipment within one year or return it. The rules allow police to dispose of or sell some goods after at least one year of use.

==== School and campus police ====
As of 2014, more than 20 school police departments and 117 campus police departments have received equipment through the 1033 Program. The most oft-cited reasons for the acquisition of military equipment by school and campus police are school shooting responses and cost savings.

School police departments reported to have received weapons, equipment, and vehicles from the program (or returned them due to public backlash) include the San Diego Unified School District Police Department, the Los Angeles School Police Department, and at least ten school police departments in Texas, among others.

Colleges and universities whose campus police departments are reported to have received or returned equipment from the 1033 Program include Columbia University, Yale University, Hinds Community College, the University of Central Florida, the University of California, Florida State University, Florida International University, Arizona State University, the University of Maryland, Ohio State University, Central Washington University, the University of Texas System, and the University of Louisiana at Monroe.

In instances where school police departments fail to or do not directly attempt to acquire equipment from the 1033 Program, they often borrow such equipment from local and regional law enforcement through mutual aid, such as the shared use of an MRAP between the Davis, California police and the University of California, Davis Police Department.

=== Oversight ===
Law enforcement agencies receiving items from the 1033 Program must declare the intended use for each item received, maintain an audit trail for each item, and conduct inventory checks for the DLA. Firearms, certain vehicles and other equipment must be returned to the Defense Department after use. Per the DLA, "For security reasons [1033 Program record] information is not subject to public review".

A state coordinating agency in each U.S. state except Hawaii is supposed to function as oversight after dispersion of equipment, headed and overseen by a state coordinator that is appointed by the state governor who must approve applications. The state coordinating agency is housed within a state agency that varies from state to state, such as the Alaska Department of Public Safety or the California Governor's Office of Emergency Services.

In 2010, a police detective was appointed as Arizona's state coordinator; this reportedly allowed the Pinal County Sheriff's Office to amass over $7 million worth of military equipment between 2010 and 2012, which Sheriff Paul Babeu told county supervisors he would auction off to balance the PCSO's budget. The state coordinator had appointed an office grants administrator in the PCSO to help Babeu "oversee and authorize military-surplus requisitions"; however, this also allowed the PCSO to approve their own requests with little oversight. After The Arizona Republic newspaper reported the misconduct, the DLA "announced agency-wide reforms", Babeu was ordered to "retrieve vehicles and other equipment his office distributed to non-police organizations", and 1033 Program weapons requisitions were temporarily suspended and audited nationwide.

In 2003, a Department of Defense Office of Inspector General audit found incorrect or inadequate documentation in about three-quarters of the transactions analyzed, declaring LESO records unreliable. In 2005, the Government Accountability Office found that the DoD "does not have management controls in place" to avert waste, abuse, and fraud in the 1033 Program, and identified "hundreds of millions of dollars in reported lost, damaged, or stolen excess property ... which contributed to reutilization program waste and inefficiency."

==== Suspensions ====
The DLA can suspend law enforcement agencies from the 1033 Program for failing to meet the program's standards and guidelines, including misuse or misplacement of transferred equipment.

DLA public affairs chief Kenneth MacNevin stated in 2012 that "more than 30 Arizona police agencies have been suspended or terminated for failing to meet program standards and nine remain under suspension". One of them, the Maricopa County Sheriff's Office, was suspended after it failed to account for 20 of the 200 weapons it had received. The MCSO blamed the errors on outdated computers and tracking devices from when the weapons were transferred in the 1990s. According to Sheriff Joe Arpaio, the suspension did not affect the MCSO's acquisition of weaponry, as they could already afford them using anti-racketeering funding and confiscated narcotics proceeds.

Law enforcement agencies in North Carolina were suspended from the 1033 Program for failing to account for some equipment transferred to them from the program. North Carolina officials stated that 3,303 out of the 4,227 pieces of equipment obtained through the program are tactical items including automatic weapons and military vehicles, and that the remainder is not used in combat and includes sleeping bags, containers, and generators.

Fusion reported in August 2014 that a total of 184 state and local police departments had been suspended from the program for missing weapons and failure to comply with guidelines. Missing items included firearms and two Humvees.

Investigative journalist Susan Katz Keating reported in October 2017 that certain elements of the program were restored despite the compliance issues.

In 2017, the Government Accountability Office engaged in a sting purchase operation by creating a fake law enforcement agency website and using its name to obtain controlled military equipment from the 1033 program.

== Responses ==
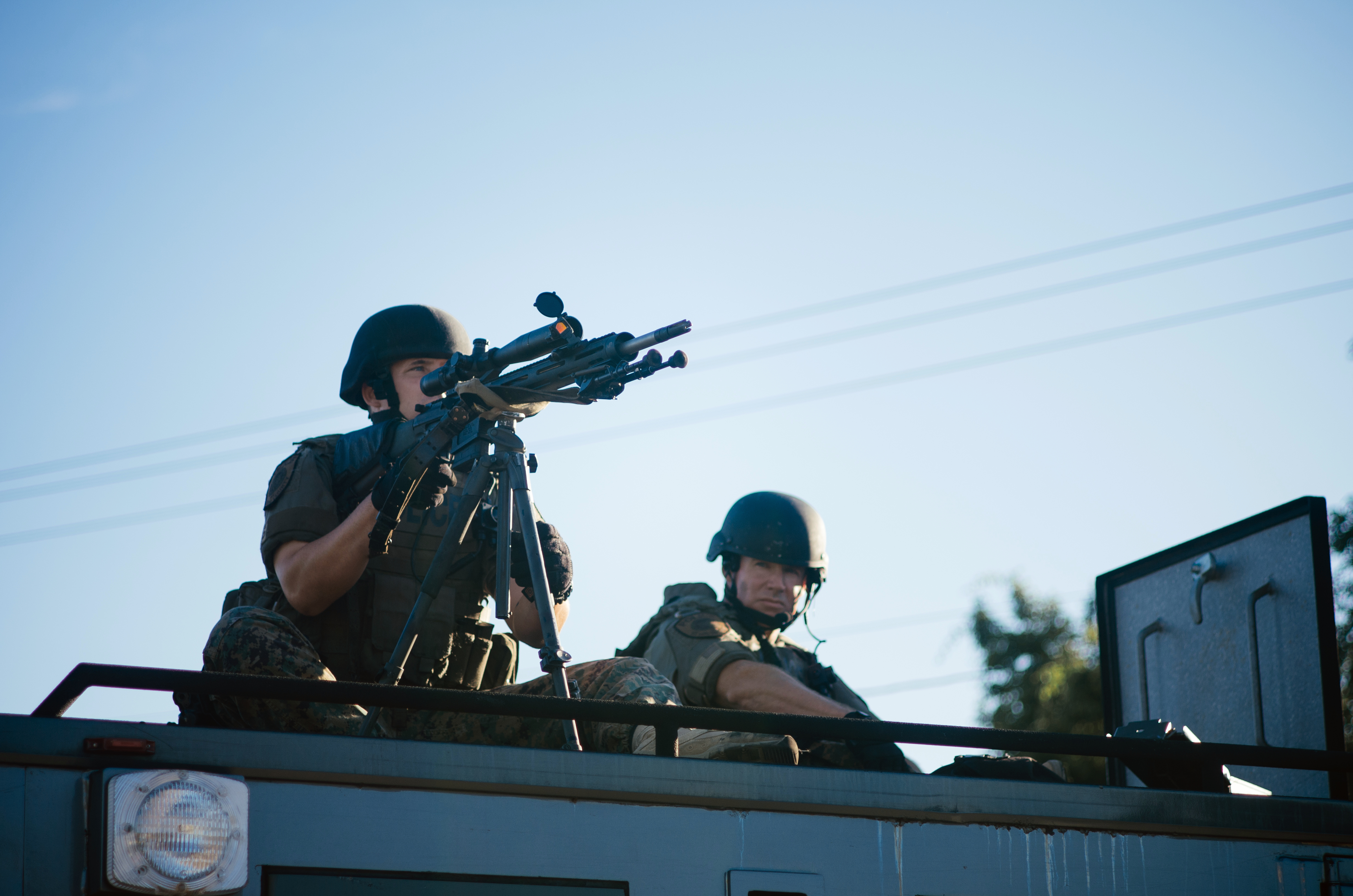
A police officer wearing body armor using a sniper rifle atop a SWAT vehicle to survey a crowd of protestors during the 2014 Ferguson unrest

=== Criticism ===
Public, scholarly, and political criticism of LESO and the 1033 Program increased following the Ferguson unrest in 2014, the Baltimore protests in 2015, and the George Floyd protests in 2020, when police used vehicles and equipment acquired from the program for riot control, which is prohibited, as opposed to their intended use in tactical operations, drug enforcement, and counterterrorism.

Kara Dansky, senior counsel for the ACLU, alleged that the federal government is deliberately militarizing police through the 1033 Program to use them against minority communities. Responding to reports of missing weapons, Alessandra Soler, executive director of the ACLU of Arizona, opined that it "wasn't surprising" due to the lack of oversight and public transparency in the 1033 Program.

Janai Nelson, associate director of the NAACP Legal Defense and Educational Fund, criticized the 1033 Program for militarizing police and negatively affecting Black communities, and condemned the 2017 lifting of restrictions on the program as "exceptionally dangerous and irresponsible".

According to a 2017 study by social scientist Casey Delehanty and colleagues, larger 1033 Program transfers are associated with increased killings by police.

==== Political criticism ====
Bipartisan criticisms of the 1033 Program were made by numerous American politicians over the course of 2014, during the Ferguson unrest.

- President Barack Obama ordered a review of the 1033 Program and police use of acquisitions from the program. Following the 2015 Baltimore protests, Obama announced reviews of the use of military equipment, stating military equipment in police use "gives people a feeling like they are an occupying force as opposed to a part of the community there to protect them," and stating that "some equipment made for the battlefield is not appropriate for local police departments."
- Senator Rand Paul, writing an op-ed in Time, stated that the American government "has incentivized the militarization of local police precincts and helped municipal governments build what are essentially small armies." Paul's second Ferguson op-ed in Time did not mention the demilitarization of the police.
- Senator Claire McCaskill suggested that "Congress would seek to better train police to use transferred equipment".
- Representative Buck McKeon scheduled a United States House Committee on Armed Services subcommittee "Oversight and Investigations" hearing to examine the program, which was postponed.
- Representative Hank Johnson urged the heads of the Armed Services Committees to adopt a moratorium on the transfer of certain items and to eliminate a section of the House version of the 2015 National Defense Authorization Act, passed earlier in 2014, that would expand equipment transfers to U.S. Customs and Border Protection, the largest law enforcement agency in the U.S..
- Representative Hank Johnson drafted legislation proposing to curb but not end the 1033 Program, and urged legislative armed services committee to suspend the transfer of some equipment.
- The House Committee on Armed Services reviewed the program and interviewed four witnesses: the president of the Police Foundation, the director of the National Tactical Officers Association, and two DoD employees. Their heads, Reps. Buck McKeon (R-Calif.) and Adam Smith (D-Wash.), worked on a compromise of the 2015 National Defense Authorization Act instead of a moratorium.
- Brian Kamoie, assistant administrator for grant programs at the Federal Emergency Management Agency, stated that officials were conducting a review to determine if police deployed in Ferguson improperly used equipment purchased with the grants for riot suppression, which is not allowed. It was inconclusive from questioning how many times equipment was purchased with funds used to combat terrorism.

In September 2014, Senator Claire McCaskill organized the Senate's first hearing on the program, and federal officials faced bipartisan criticism. However, the House Judiciary Committee declined to review the program, stating that any review would follow an investigation by the Obama administration, while police lobbying efforts and the 2014 United States elections rendered Congress lame duck, and support for changing or ending the 1033 Program dwindled.

=== Defense ===
Numerous defenses of LESO and the 1033 Program have been made, primarily by DoD officials, law enforcement officials, and supporters.

DoD press secretary Rear Admiral John Kirby stated that the 1033 Program ultimately protects civilians and aids law enforcement across the U.S. in counterterrorism and anti-narcotic operations. He added that the DoD was diligent in deciding what equipment was sent to specific police departments.

Chuck Canterbury, president of the Fraternal Order of Police (FOP), defended the 1033 Program, stating that incidents requiring the use of 1033 Program equipment could occur anywhere in the U.S. (specifically highlighting mass shootings in the small towns of Columbine, Colorado and Killeen, Texas) and that military equipment obtained from the program is used to protect civilians, not against them. Referring to the then-ongoing Ferguson unrest, Kirby suggested that police would be criticized regardless for not responding effectively if they did not have equipment from the 1033 Program, and claimed police were only using their equipment against "mass gang[s] of criminals", not peaceful protestors.

Police officer Steve Rabinovich, writing for PoliceOne, defended the 1033 Program as necessary for protecting police officers from violent or deadly assaults by individuals or anti-government groups viewing police as scapegoats. Rabinovich also stated that the transfer of retired MRAPs to police was a better use of the vehicles than selling them to foreign militaries or leaving them for scrap or disuse.

In 2017, while announcing Trump's roll-back of 1033 Program limitations to the FOP, Attorney General Jeff Sessions dismissed criticisms of the 1033 Program as "superficial concerns" and suggested that Obama's limitations were only a concession to protestors. Similarly, FOP president James Pasco defended the 1033 Program as necessary for smaller police departments and noted the vehicles offered by the program were not armed.

== See also ==
- Militarization of police
