= Military surplus =

Obsolete or obsolescent military goods usually offered for sale

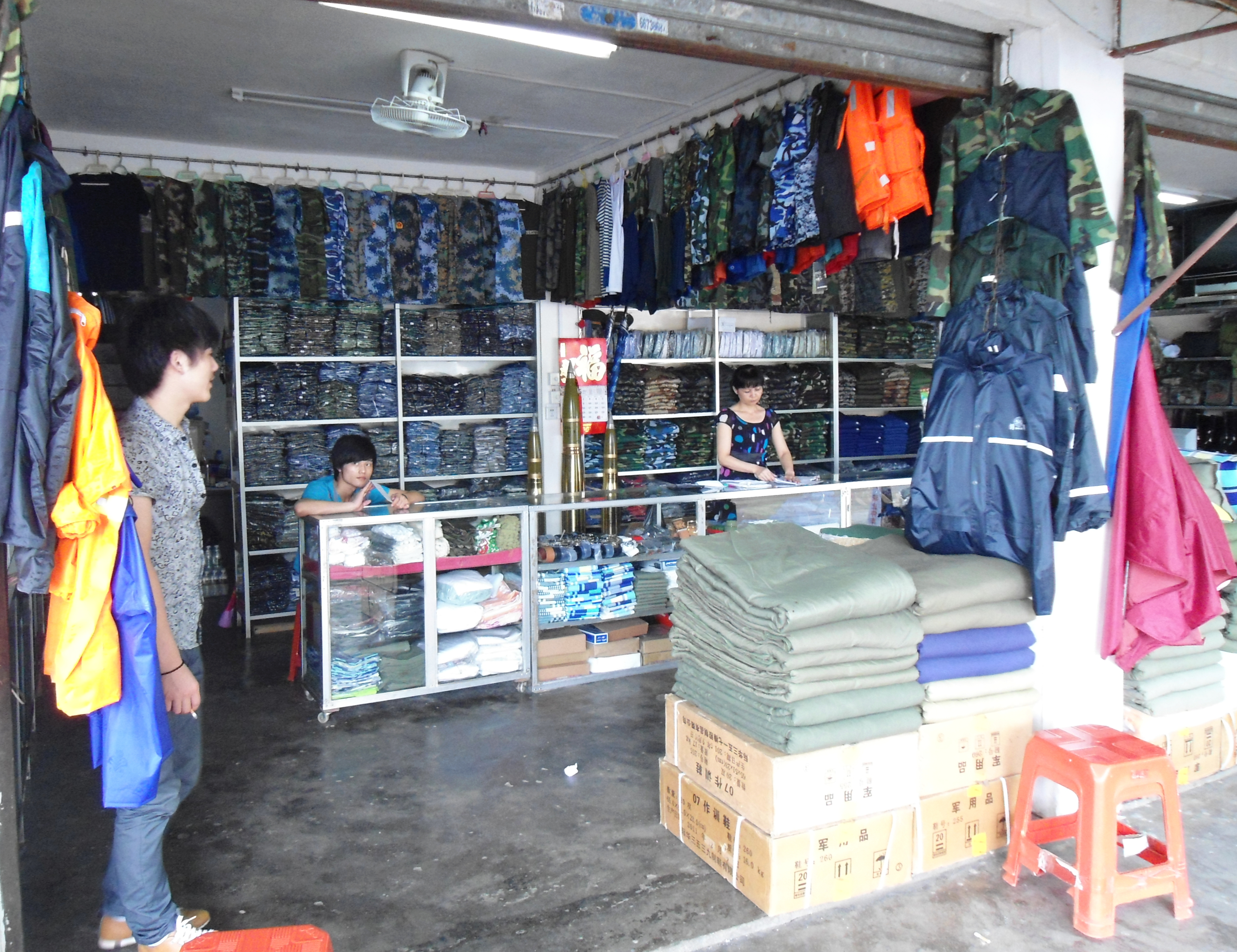
A military surplus shop in Haikou City, Hainan Province, China

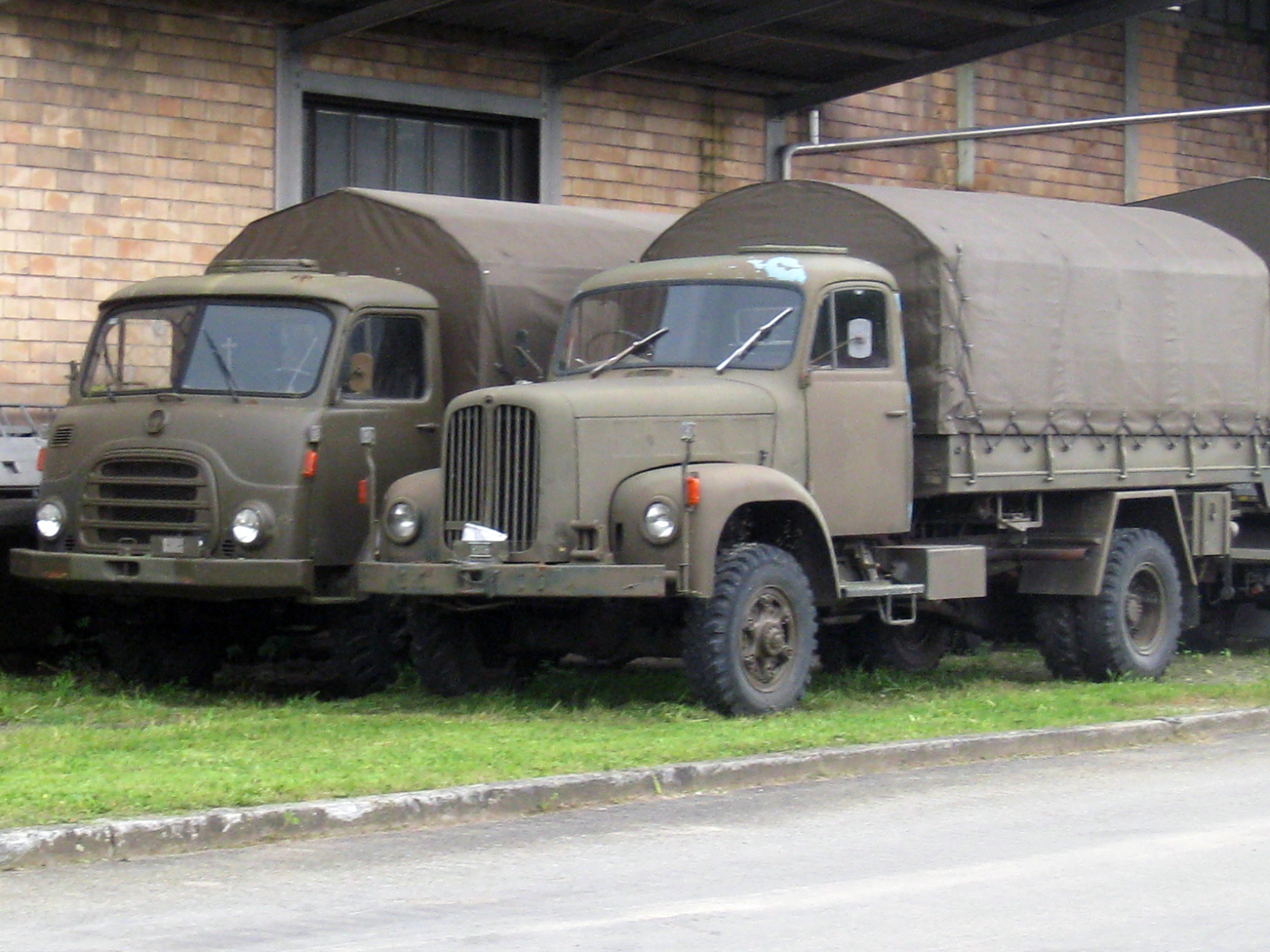
Military surplus trucks

Military surplus is goods, usually materiel, that are sold or otherwise disposed of when held in excess or are no longer needed by the military. Entrepreneurs often buy these goods and resell them at surplus stores. Usually the goods sold by the military are clothing, equipment, and tools of a nature that is generally useful to the civilian population, as well as embroidered patches, name tags, and other items that can be used for a faux military uniform. Occasionally, vehicles (jeeps, trucks, etc.) will be sold as well. Some military surplus dealers also sell military surplus firearms, spare parts, and ammunition alongside surplus uniforms and equipment.

Demand for such items comes from various collectors, outdoorsmen, adventurers, hunters, survivalists, and players of airsoft and paintball, as well as others seeking high quality, sturdy, military issue garb. Reenactment groups usually seek historically-accurate restrike uniforms and equipment for displays, filmwork etc.

The goods may be used, or not. Some merchants of surplus goods also sell goods that are privately manufactured in military standards. Most items that are sold in military surplus stores in the United States are deemed "military grade". This designation refers to meeting a relevant United States Military Standard. For example, uniforms meet Army Regulation 670-1.

== History ==
=== United States ===
The history of army surplus in the United States dates back to the aftermath of the American Civil War. The US government possessed huge quantities of surplus uniforms and equipment. The US Army sold large numbers of old-pattern uniforms to the point that Congress disallowed spending on new uniforms until the obsolete patterns were depleted.

In the 1870s, Francis Bannerman VI operated "Bannerman's surplus". His surplus company was one of the largest ever to operate. He built Bannerman's Castle, a massive storage facility on Pollepel Island in the Hudson River, to store his goods.

The Military Surplus Act (or Kahn-Wadsworth Act) was signed into US law by the 66th US Congress in 1920. Sponsored by Representative Julius Kahn (R) of California and Senator James Wolcott Wadsworth, Jr. (R) of New York, it distributed 25,000 surplus army trucks to state highway departments for road-building purposes.

The Surplus Property Act of 1944 (ch. 479, 58 Stat. 765, 50A U.S.C. § 1611 et seq., enacted October 3, 1944) is an act of the United States Congress that provided for the disposal of surplus government property to "a State, political subdivision of a State, or tax-supported organization". It authorized a three-member board, known as the Surplus Property Board, a structure that was replaced within a year by an agency run by a single administrator. Many of its provisions were repealed on July 1, 1949.

The Foreign Assistance Act of 1961 defines "Excess Defense Articles". The EDA Program is administered by the Defense Security Cooperation Agency (DSCA). Excess defense articles are US DoD and US Coast Guard-owned articles no longer needed and declared excess. This excess equipment may be offered at reduced or no cost to eligible foreign recipients on an “as is, where is” basis in support of national security and foreign policy objectives.

The Arms Export Control Act instituted the International Traffic in Arms Regulations (ITAR) in 1976 during the Cold War with the USSR and were intended to implement unilateral arms export controls that reflected those imposed on Eastern Bloc countries by the multilateral Coordinating Committee for Multilateral Export Controls. Though they be surplus, goods are still subject to ITAR regulations.

== See also ==
- Diminishing manufacturing sources and material shortages
- Performance-based logistics
- Rivethead
- Surplus store
- Spare part
- Uniform fetishism
