= Fulbright–Hays Act of 1961 =

US foreign policy law

- Long title: An Act to provide for the improvement and strengthening of the international relations of the United States by promoting better mutual understanding among the peoples of the world through educational and cultural exchanges.
- Acronyms (colloquial): MECEA
- Nicknames: Mutual Educational and Cultural Exchange Act of 1961
- Enacted by: the 87th United States Congress
- Effective: September 21, 1961

Citations
- Public law: 87–256
- Statutes at Large: 75 Stat. 527

Codification
- Titles amended: 22 U.S.C.: Foreign Relations and Intercourse
- U.S.C. sections amended: 22 U.S.C. ch. 33 § 2451 et seq.

Legislative history
- Introduced in the House as H.R. 8666 by Wayne Hays (D–OH) on August 31, 1961; Committee consideration by House Foreign Affairs, Senate Foreign Relations; Passed the Senate on July 14, 1961 (79-5, in lieu of S. 1154); Passed the House on September 6, 1961 (329-66); Reported by the joint conference committee on September 15, 1961; agreed to by the Senate on September 15, 1961 (Agreed) and by the House on September 16, 1961 (Agreed); Signed into law by President John F. Kennedy on September 21, 1961

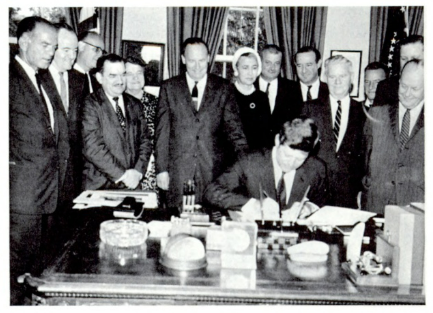
President John F. Kennedy signs the Fulbright-Hays Act on September 21, 1961

The Fulbright–Hays Act of 1961 is officially known as the Mutual Educational and Cultural Exchange Act of 1961 (Pub. L. 87–256, 75 Stat. 527). It was marshalled by United States Senator J. William Fulbright (D-AR) and passed by the 87th United States Congress on September 16, 1961, the same month the Foreign Assistance Act of 1961 and Peace Corps Act of 1961 were enacted.

The legislation was enacted into law by President John F. Kennedy on September 21, 1961.

== Purpose ==
As the preamble of the Fulbright–Hays Act of 1961 states:

The purpose of this chapter is to enable the Government of the United States to increase mutual understanding between the people of the United States and the people of other countries by means of educational and cultural exchange; to strengthen the ties which unite us with other nations by demonstrating the educational and cultural interests, developments, and achievements of the people of the United States and other nations, and the contributions being made toward a peaceful and more fruitful life for people throughout the world; to promote international cooperation for educational and cultural advancement; and thus to assist in the development of friendly, sympathetic, and peaceful relations between the United States and the other countries of the world.

== United States Congressional Authorizations and Declarations ==
U.S. Statutes regarding the Educational and Cultural Exchange Act, 1961
Date of Enactment	Public Law No.	U.S. Statute	U.S. Bill No.	U.S. Presidential Administration
October 29, 1966	P.L. 89-698	80 Stat. 1066	H.R. 14643	Lyndon B. Johnson
November 5, 1966	P.L. 89-766	80 Stat. 1314	S. 1760	Lyndon B. Johnson
July 13, 1972	P.L. 92-352	86 Stat. 489	H.R. 14734	Richard Nixon
October 26, 1974	P.L. 93-475	88 Stat. 1439	S. 3473	Gerald Ford
July 12, 1976	P.L. 94-350	90 Stat. 823	S. 3168	Gerald Ford
August 17, 1977	P.L. 95-105	91 Stat. 844	H.R. 6689	Jimmy Carter
August 15, 1979	P.L. 96-60	93 Stat. 395	H.R. 3363	Jimmy Carter
August 16, 1985	P.L. 99-93	99 Stat. 405	H.R. 2068	Ronald Reagan
December 22, 1987	P.L. 100-204	101 Stat. 1331	H.R. 1777	Ronald Reagan
February 16, 1990	P.L. 101-246	104 Stat. 15	H.R. 3792	George H. W. Bush
October 28, 1991	P.L. 102-138	105 Stat. 647	H.R. 1415	George H. W. Bush
April 30, 1994	P.L. 103-236	108 Stat. 382	H.R. 2333	William J. Clinton
October 21, 1998	P.L. 105-277	112 Stat. 2681	H.R. 4328	William J. Clinton
November 28, 2001	P.L. 107-77	115 Stat. 748	H.R. 2500	George W. Bush
September 30, 2002	P.L. 107-228	116 Stat. 1350	H.R. 1646	George W. Bush

== See also ==
- Bureau of Educational and Cultural Affairs
- U.S. Cultural Exchange Programs
- Fulbright Program
- United States Information Agency
- Student & Exchange Visitor Program
- World Festival of Youth and Students
- Fulbright Act of 1946
- U.S. Educational Exchange Act, 1948
- Lacy-Zarubin Agreement of 1958
- National Defense Education Act, 1958
- FRIENDSHIP Act of 1993
