= Surplus Property Board =

The Surplus Property Board (SPB) was briefly responsible for disposing of $90 billion of surplus war property held by the United States government in the final year of World War II. Created by the Surplus Property Act of 1944, the Board functioned for less than nine months, before being replaced by a more streamlined agency.

== Authorization ==
The aims of the Surplus Property Act were not limited to distributing surplus property; they also included re-establishing free independent enterprise, strengthening the competitive position of new and small businesspersons and family farmers, and putting government property to widespread, nonmonopolistic use.

President Franklin D. Roosevelt's economic advisor, Bernard Baruch, originally recommended that the U.S. dispose of surplus war goods through an agency run by a single administrator (and assisted by a policy board), and with general statutory authority. Through an Executive Order, Roosevelt established the Surplus War Property Administration and named public servant and former Texas cotton broker William L. Clayton to administer it. In the Act, however, Congress rejected that approach, providing instead for a three-member board with significantly constrained authority. President Roosevelt signed the Act "with considerable reluctance," because of the danger that "the confused methods of disposition and the elaborate restrictions: imposed by the Act "would clearly delay rather than expedite reconversion and re-employment." The Board was also placed under the Office of War Mobilization and Reconversion.

== Appointment and implementation ==
Though the Act was signed on October 3, 1944, the Board was not organized until January 1945. President Roosevelt found it difficult to find persons willing to serve on the Board. Clayton had made it clear that, if the Act were adopted, he would not become a board member. Roosevelt's initial preference as chair, former South Carolina banker and Defense Plant Corp. President Sam H. Husbands, was never nominated because of anticipated resistance in the lame-duck 1944 Senate. Roosevelt instead nominated a member of that body, recently defeated Iowa U.S. Senator Guy Gillette, on November 21, 1944. However, the choice of a Senator who had voted on the Act created a temporary constitutional bar to his appointment, delaying the effectiveness of his appointment until on January 4, 1945, one day after the end of his Senate term. The two other members of the Board were former Connecticut Governor Robert A. Hurley and Lieut. Colonel Edward Hellman Heller, a wealthy member of one of San Francisco's first families, who had resigned seven directorships to join the U.S. Army.

By April 1945, newspapers reported that Gillette already disliked the job, and had complained that he was often out-voted by the two other members. In May 1945 Gillette resigned effective July 15, 1945, and President Harry S. Truman appointed St. Louis manufacturing executive W. Stuart Symington to succeed him as chair.

Nevertheless, in a July 17, 1945, message to Congress, President Truman acknowledged the Board's "substantial achievements:"

It has set in motion the disposal machinery which Congress authorized and it has begun to implement the standards which Congress laid down for the disposal of surplus property. Regulations already promulgated or in the process of adoption cover the most important types of property-consumer goods, plant equipment, industrial plants and farm lands.

Years of wartime rationing had created a pent-up demand for many kinds of goods that the government had accumulated. That demand was exacerbated by the return of millions of veterans to civilian life. But the Board’s policymaking responsibilities were complicated by the potential implications of selling too much surplus property at once, at discounted prices. The amount of surplus property was so vast that private manufacturers feared that, once offered for sale, it would harm domestic markets for privately produced goods and exacerbate a postwar recession. The Board responded by pledging not to sell more than the market could absorb, and to rely upon sales to new foreign buyers in order to introduce new markets to American goods.

== Replacement ==
Gillette, Symington, President Truman, and the more liberal 1945 U.S. Congress concurred that the Act’s three-member Board was inferior to the single-administrator-plan originally proposed. President Truman proposed in July 1945 to reorganize the Board into an agency with a single head, and Congress soon agreed. The Board was superseded by the Surplus Property Administration (SPA), pursuant to an act of September 18, 1945.

Board chairman Symington was the SPA’s first administrator. Then, in 1946, domestic functions of the SPA were assigned to War Assets Administration. Truman named Symington as Assistant Secretary of War for Air, and then as the first Secretary of the Air Force.

== See also ==
- Reconstruction Finance Corporation
- List of recessions in the United States
