= Iranian Fiduciary Trust Fund Act of 1950 =

- Long title: An Act to discharge a fiduciary obligation to Iran.
- Nicknames: Iranian Foreign Educational Act of 1950
- Enacted by: the 81st United States Congress
- Effective: September 29, 1950

Citations
- Public law: Pub. L. 81–861
- Statutes at Large: 64 Stat. 1081

Codification
- Titles amended: 20 U.S.C.: Education
- U.S.C. sections created: 20 U.S.C. ch. 12 § 225

Legislative history
- Introduced in the House as H.R. 5731 by A. S. J. Carnahan (D–MO) on August 1, 1949; Signed into law by President Harry S. Truman on September 29, 1950

Iranian Fiduciary Trust Fund Act of 1950 was authorized by the 81st United States Congress which established a trust fund for the education of Iranian naturalized persons in the United States. The Iranian academic student exchange program affiliated the United States Cultural Exchange Programs within the cross-cultural auspices and sponsorship of the Fulbright Act of 1946.

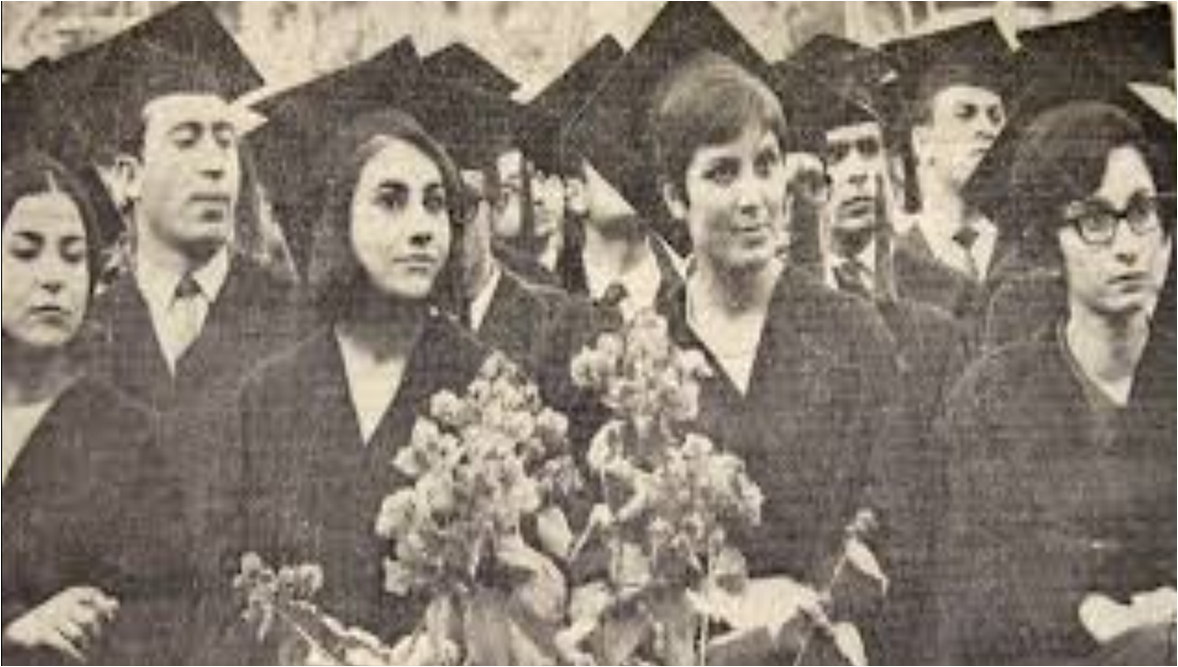
Commencement of Iranian students

The Act of Congress confirmed the Iranian trust fund was to be governed by the United States and the Iranian government occurring in four transaction installments as an accrued amount of one hundred and ten thousand dollars between December 24, 1924, and March 29, 1925. The trust fund was conditionally in accordance with the Diplomatic and Consular Service Appropriations Act of 1896 as codified by 29 Stat. 32 entitled Trust Funds. The United States federal statute amended the Permanent Appropriations Repeal Act of 1934 providing an addendum to section twenty entitled Certain Funds Established as Trust Fund Accounts.

== Origins of Iranian Educational Exchange Act ==
Tehran, capital of Persia (Iran), attested to periodic societal rivalries with the Baháʼí Faith during the 1920s of the Qajar dynasty and succession of the Pahlavi dynasty.

A United States Foreign Service officer by the name of Robert Whitney Imbrie was serving in Iran on a temporary assignment as a consul representing the foreign relations of the United States. Robert Imbrie and Melvin Seymour toured the Grand Bazaar, Tehran seeking the sacred waters ― Miracles at Saqqa-khaneh ― of Persian gardens on July 18, 1924. The foreign envoys were accosted by contradictory skeptics prone to religious violence to the Baháʼí orthodoxy sustaining a declaration of faith integral to the Religion in Iran. The accentuating social exchange with the Persians ― Islam in Iran ― proved to be a fateful engagement for the United States foreign service officer in July 1924.

Katherine Imbrie, wife of Robert Whitney Imbrie, judiciously appealed to the 69th United States Congress in 1926. The public plea was an expediency for expenditure of funds advancing the education of Persian students in the United States.

== See also ==
- Allen Dulles
- Anglo-Iranian Oil Co. case
- Anglo-Persian Agreement
- Anglo-Persian Oil Company
- Charles Evans Hughes
- Esmond Ovey
- Islamic extremism
- Joseph Saul Kornfeld
- Nationalization of the Iranian oil industry
- Wallace S. Murray

== Archival documents of U.S. Department of State ==
- "The Secretary of State to the Minister in Persia (Kornfeld)". Office of the Historian ~ Foreign Service Institute. Papers Relating to the Foreign Relations of the United States, 1924, Volume II, Document 508. United States Department of State. August 22, 1924.
- "The Secretary of State to the Chargé in Persia (Murray)". Office of the Historian ~ Foreign Service Institute. Papers Relating to the Foreign Relations of the United States, 1924, Volume II, Document 509. United States Department of State. September 15, 1924.
- "The Chargé in Persia (Murray) to the Secretary of State". Office of the Historian ~ Foreign Service Institute. Papers Relating to the Foreign Relations of the United States, 1924, Volume II, Document 479. United States Department of State. September 19, 1924.
- "The Chargé in Persia (Murray) to the Secretary of State". Office of the Historian ~ Foreign Service Institute. Papers Relating to the Foreign Relations of the United States, 1924, Volume II, Document 510. United States Department of State. September 23, 1924.
- "The Chargé in Persia (Murray) to the Secretary of State". Office of the Historian ~ Foreign Service Institute. Papers Relating to the Foreign Relations of the United States, 1924, Volume II, Document 511. United States Department of State. October 5, 1924.
- "Review and Redirection of Specific Program Activities". 1951 Fifth Report, U.S. Advisory Commission on Educational Exchange. U.S. Department of State ~ U.S. Advisory Commission on Public Diplomacy. United States Government Printing Office: 3–4. April 6, 1951.

== Bibliography ==
- Imbrie, Robert Whitney (1918). "Behind the Wheel of a War Ambulance". Internet Archive. R.M. McBride & Co. OCLC 1041071694.
- Zirinsky, Michael P. (August 1986). "Blood, Power, and Hypocrisy: The Murder of Robert Imbrie and American Relations with Pehlavi Iran, 1924". International Journal of Middle East Studies. 18 (3). Cambridge University Press: 275–292. doi:10.1017/S0020743800030488. JSTOR 163379.
- Mohammad Gholi Majd (November 2006). Oil and the Killing of the American Consul in Tehran. University Press of America. pp. 239–350. doi:10.1017/S0020743808081774. ISBN 978-0761835042. OCLC 70243907.
- Stein, Susan M. (July 1, 2020). On Distant Service: The Life of the First U.S. Foreign Service Officer to Be Assassinated. Lincoln, Nebraska: University of Nebraska Press. doi:10.2307/j.ctv10sm8rd. ISBN 978-1640121942. JSTOR j.ctv10sm8rd. OCLC 1120149518.
- Zirinsky, Michael P. (May 2022). "Lethal Encounter in Tehran: The Attack on U.S. Vice Consul Robert W. Imbrie and Its Aftermath". Foreign Service Journal. American Foreign Service Association.
