= Military Surplus Act (Kahn–Wadsworth Act) =

Kahn–Wadsworth Act
- Long title: An Act to authorize the Secretary of War to transfer certain surplus motor-propelled vehicles and motor equipment and road-making material to various services and departments of the Government, and for the use of the States.
- Nicknames: Military Surplus Act of 1920
- Enacted by: the 66th United States Congress
- Effective: March 15, 1920

Citations
- Public law: Pub. L. 66–159
- Statutes at Large: 41 Stat. 530, Chap. 100

Legislative history
- Introduced in the Senate as S. 3037; Signed into law by President Woodrow Wilson on March 15, 1920

The Military Surplus Act (or Kahn-Wadsworth Act) was signed into US law by the 66th US Congress in 1920. Sponsored by Representative Julius Kahn (R) of California and Senator James Wolcott Wadsworth, Jr. (R) of New York, it distributed 25,000 surplus army trucks to state highway departments for road-building purposes.

== See also ==
- National Defense Act of 1920
