= Smith–Mundt Act =

Law regulating State Department broadcasting

- Long title: An Act to promote the better understanding of the United States among the peoples of the world and to strengthen cooperative international relations.
- Acronyms (colloquial): IEEA
- Nicknames: United States Information and Educational Exchange Act of 1948
- Enacted by: the 80th United States Congress
- Effective: January 27, 1948

Citations
- Public law: Pub. L. 80–402
- Statutes at Large: 62 Stat. 6

Codification
- Titles amended: 22 U.S.C.: Foreign Relations and Intercourse
- U.S.C. sections created: 22 U.S.C. ch. 18 § 1431 et seq.

Legislative history
- Introduced in the House as H.R. 3342 by Karl E. Mundt (R–SD) on May 21, 1947; Committee consideration by House Foreign Affairs, Senate Foreign Relations; Passed the House on June 24, 1947 (273-97); Passed the Senate on January 16, 1948 (Passed) with amendment; House agreed to Senate amendment on January 19, 1948 (Passed); Signed into law by President Harry S. Truman on January 27, 1948

The U.S. Information and Educational Exchange Act of 1948 (Public Law 80-402), popularly called the Smith–Mundt Act, was first introduced by Congressman Karl E. Mundt (R-SD) in January 1945 in the 79th Congress. It was subsequently passed by the 80th Congress and signed into law by President Harry S. Truman on January 27, 1948.

The Act was developed to regulate broadcasting of programs for foreign audiences produced under the guidance of the State Department, and it prohibited domestic dissemination of materials produced by such programs as one of its provisions. The original version of the Act was amended by the Smith–Mundt Modernization Act of 2012 which allowed for materials produced by the State Department and the Broadcasting Board of Governors (BBG) to be made available within the United States.

== History ==
=== Origins of the bill ===
The original legislation authorizes the U.S. State Department to communicate to audiences outside of the borders of the United States through broadcasting, face-to-face contacts, exchanges (including educational, cultural, and technical), the publishing of books, magazines, and other media of communication and engagement. Funding for these activities comes from other legislation passed by the U.S. Congress called appropriations.

The legislation was introduced in the House Committee on Foreign Affairs in January 1945 by Rep. Mundt, a member of the committee. It was modified a few months later at the request of the State Department. At this time, it did not include broadcasting. The bill was reintroduced with the State Department's requests and renamed the Bloom Bill, after the committee's chairman, Rep. Sol Bloom (D-NY). The purpose was to make permanent various exchange activities, and some information programs such as books and other printed material. President Truman's dissolution of the Office of War Information (OWI) included moving substantial OWI programs over to the State Department, including a radio broadcast operation not-yet-commonly known as the Voice of America. The Bloom Bill was altered and reintroduced in October 1945 to include the substantial information programs from OWI, notably the libraries, book publishing, movies and film strip production, and speakers tours. In December 1945, it was reintroduced again as H.R. 4982, but whereas the previous iterations amended pre-war legislation from 1939 authorizing exchanges in the American Republics, plus the Philippines, this time was a stand-alone and it also included the radio operation. The language "shall disseminate" abroad found in the early versions was a specific authority requested by the State Department to permit it to operate globally. Under previous authorities, the department was restricted to operating these programs within North, Central, and South America. It would provide legislative approval for a new peacetime instrument of foreign policy.

=== Congressional concerns ===
Congress harbored significant reservations about empowering the State Department to propagate informational and ideological materials to the American public. A key issue was oversight over State Department programs, including exchanges, which books were distributed abroad, art that was distributed as representing the United States, and the radio programming. When the Bloom Bill (H.R. 4982) went to the House Rules Committee in February 1946, committee Chairman Eugene Cox (D-GA) informed Assistant Secretary of State for Public Affairs William B. Benton that ten of the twelve committee members were against anything the State Department favored because of its "Communist infiltration and pro-Russian policy". That the House Foreign Affairs Committee unanimously reported the bill out was meaningless. Cox told Benton that the Foreign Affairs Committee was "a worthless committee consisting of worthless impotent Congressmen; it was a kind of ghetto of the House of Representatives".

Cox publicly characterized the State Department as "chock full of Reds" and "the lousiest outfit in town". The information component of the Bloom Bill was seen as a revitalization of the Office of War Information, for which many in Congress held contempt as a New Deal "transgression". The cultural component was held in greater disdain, which caused Benton to change the name of his office from the Office of Cultural and Public Affairs a year after it was created to the Office of Public Affairs.

Other comments were similarly tough. The ranking minority member of the House of Representatives Appropriations Committee, Rep. John Taber (R-NY), called for a "house-cleaning" of "some folks" in the State Department to "keep only those people whose first loyalty is to the United States". The Federal Bureau of Investigation was also concerned over the ability of State to monitor and control participants in the exchange programs.

=== Debate and passage ===
In July 1946, the Bloom Bill passed the House, but due to a failure to steward the bill in the Senate, it was blocked from moving in the United States Senate by Senator Robert A. Taft. Taft's reasoning, which he gave in a speech later, was concern about a growing government bureaucracy. After the department, when Congress reconvened, Taft supported the legislation.

On March 21, 1947, pre–Pearl Harbor isolationist and former teacher Representative Karl E. Mundt (R-SD) introduced H.R. 3342, which was an evolution from the bill he had originally introduced in January 1945, which itself was a version of a bill he introduced in March 1943, at the request of the State Department. The State Department's information and exchange activities were still ongoing, although without authorization from the Congress. The authority was derived from Congressional appropriations legislation. In other words, the activities continued because they received money from Congress, which carried implicit authority but actual authority was still lacking.

Co-sponsoring the Mundt bill in the Senate was Senator H. Alexander Smith (R-NJ). The stated purpose of the reintroduced legislation was not to curtail the overall information activities of the United States, but to raise the quality and volume of the government's information programs. As the State Department admitted to lax oversight due to personnel and budget constraints, Congress voiced its frustration and slashed State's information budget. This time, Taber said if the "drones, the loafers, and the incompetents" were weeded out, he would allow a few million dollars for international broadcasting.

Several significant leaders went to the House to testify in support of the bill, including Secretary of State George C. Marshall, Chief of Staff General Dwight D. Eisenhower, Under Secretary of State Dean Acheson, Secretary of Commerce W. Averell Harriman (formerly the Ambassador to the Soviet Union), and Ambassador to the Soviet Union Walter Bedell Smith. They agreed that it was "folly" to spend millions for foreign aid and relief without explaining America's aims.

Congress, in recommending passage of the bill, declared that "truth can be a powerful weapon". Congress further declared six principles were required for the legislation to be successful in action: tell the truth; explain the motives of the United States; bolster morale and extend hope; give a true and convincing picture of American life, methods, and ideals; combat misrepresentation and distortion; and aggressively interpret and support American foreign policy. As a Cold War measure, it was intended to compete with propaganda from the Soviet Union and Communist organizations primarily in Europe. The principal purpose of the legislation was to engage in a global struggle for minds and wills, a phrase used by Presidents Harry S. Truman and Dwight D. Eisenhower.

It established the programming mandate that still serves as the foundation for U.S. overseas information and cultural programs at the Department of State.

=== Cold War era ===
Since 1972, the act prohibits domestic access to information intended for foreign audiences. Prior to this, the United States Department of State and then the United States Information Agency (USIA) beginning in 1952, were prohibited from disseminating information intended for foreign audiences, with the express intent that Congress, the American media, or academia would be the distributors of such information.

The exchanges in the act, known as the Mundt Exchanges through about the early 1960s, went beyond those of the complementary Fulbright Program to include any country and any skill. Whereas the Fulbright Act, the name Benton gave the original 1946 amendment to the Surplus Property Act of 1944, required a bilateral agreement signed by the Secretary of State following certification of the availability of local funds by the U.S. Treasury, after the sale of U.S. surplus war equipment in the nation, and supported only the exchange of students and teachers, the Mundt Act used monies appropriated by the Congress for the program and did not require a signed bilateral agreement or other certification. Further, the Mundt exchanges supported educators and students, technicians (from industry experts to sewage treatment engineers), entertainers, and even bureaucrats to help nations develop local capacity and stability.

Amendments to the Act in 1972 and 1985 reflected the Cold War's departure from the "struggle for minds and wills" (a phrase used by both President Truman and President Eisenhower) to a balance of power based on "traditional diplomacy" and counting missiles, bombers, and tanks. As a result, Senator J. William Fulbright argued America's international broadcasting should take its "rightful place in the graveyard of Cold War relics". A decade later, Senator Edward Zorinsky (D-NE) successfully blocked taxpayer access to USIA materials, even through Freedom of Information Act requests, as he compared the USIA to an organ of Soviet propaganda.

== Provisions ==
=== Domestic dissemination ===
There are three key restrictions on the U.S. State Department in the Smith–Mundt Act.

The first and most well-known restriction was originally a prohibition on domestic dissemination of materials intended for foreign audiences by the State Department. The original intent was the Congress, the media and academia would be the filter to bring inside what the State Department said overseas. In 1967, the Advisory Commission on Information (later renamed the Advisory Commission on Public Diplomacy) recommended the de facto prohibition on domestic distribution be removed noting that there is "nothing in the statutes specifically forbidding making USIA materials available to American audiences. Rather, what began as caution has hardened into policy."

This changed in 1972 when Senator J. William Fulbright (D-AR) argued that America's international broadcasting should take its "rightful place in the graveyard of Cold War relics" as he successfully amended the Act to read that any program material "shall not be disseminated" within the U.S. and that material shall be available "for examination only" to the media, academia, and Congress. In 1985, Senator Edward Zorinsky (D-NE) declared USIA would be no different than an organ of Soviet propaganda if its products were to be available domestically. The Act was amended to read: "no program material prepared by the United States Information Agency shall be distributed within the United States". At least one court interpreted this language to mean USIA products were to be exempt from Freedom of Information Act requests. In response, the Act was amended again in 1990 to permit domestic distribution of program material "12 years after the initial dissemination" abroad.

The second and third provisions were of greater interest to the Congress as they answered critical concerns about government engaging domestic audiences. Added to the Bloom Bill, the predecessor to the Smith–Mundt Act in June 1946 by Representative John M. Vorys (R-OH) "to remove the stigma of propaganda" and address the principal objections to the information activities the Congress intended to authorize. These provisions remain unamended and were the real prophylactic to address concerns the U.S. government would create Nazi-style propaganda or resurrect President Woodrow Wilson's CPI-style activities. The amendment said the information activities should only be conducted if needed to supplement international information dissemination of private agencies; that the State Department was not to acquire a monopoly of broadcasting or any other information medium; and that private sector leaders should be invited to review and advise the State Department in this work.

=== Private agencies ===
Section 1437 of the Act requires the State Department to maximize its use of "private agencies". Section 1462 requires "reducing Government information activities whenever corresponding private information dissemination is found to be adequate" and prohibits the State Department from having monopoly in any "medium of information" (a prescient phrase). Combined, these provide not only protection against government's domination of domestic discourse, but a "sunset clause" for governmental activities that Rep. Karl Mundt (R-SD) and Assistant Secretary of State for Public Affairs William Benton stated clearly: as private media stood up, government media would stand down.

=== Excerpt ===
Section 501(a) of the Act (care of the Voice of America website) provides that

information produced by VOA for audiences outside the United States shall not be disseminated within the United States … but, on request, shall be available in the English language at VOA, at all reasonable times following its release as information abroad, for examination only by representatives of United States press associations, newspapers, magazines, radio systems, and stations, and by research students and scholars, and, on request, shall be made available for examination only to Members of Congress.

== Entities covered by the act ==
The following are administered by the Broadcasting Board of Governors, an agency of the United States government.

- Voice of America, a radio, television and Internet network broadcasting worldwide, intended for reception outside of the United States
- Alhurra, satellite television broadcasting to the Middle East
- Radio Farda, a radio station targeted at Iran
- Radio Free Asia, a radio network broadcasting in Asia
- Radio Free Europe/Radio Liberty, a radio network based in Europe and the Middle East
- Radio and Television Martí, a radio and television network broadcasting in Cuba
- Radio Sawa, a radio station broadcasting in the Middle East

The Department of State is also covered by the Smith–Mundt Act. No other department or agency of the United States government is covered by the Smith–Mundt Act. The United States Agency for International Development and Millennium Challenge Corporation have said they are not sure whether they are covered.

== Recent interpretations ==
A 1998 U.S. Court of Appeals ruling indicated that this act exempts Voice of America from releasing transcripts in response to a Freedom of Information Act request.

The act does not prohibit the entirety of the Executive Branch from distributing information at home, just the State Department and Broadcasting Board of Governors. The result of the amendments to the Act means that most United States taxpayers do not know how the VOA (and its successor agencies) operate or what their programming content was, as was noted in 1967 by the Stanton Commission report noted above. The act insulates the American public from being targeted by the government-sponsored information and broadcasting which is directed at audiences beyond America's borders. Some experts claim that the United States is the only industrialized democracy to do this, and creates mistrust of the same activities in these audiences who increasingly question why Americans cannot read or hear the same material. However, anyone with an Internet connection can access VOA programs and articles for the Web, radio and television (VOA increasingly emphasizes television programming now) in English and other languages.

== U.S. Congressional amendments to the act ==
Chronological legislation relative to U.S. Congressional revisions as pertaining to the United States Information and Educational Exchange Act.

Date of enactment	Public law number	U.S. Statute citation	U.S. legislative bill	U.S. presidential administration
June 4, 1956	P.L. 84-555	70 Stat. 241	S. 2562	Dwight D. Eisenhower
August 20, 1972	P.L. 92-394	86 Stat. 577	S. 3645	Richard Nixon
July 6, 1973	P.L. 93-59	87 Stat. 142	S. 1972	Richard Nixon
August 15, 1979	P.L. 96-60	93 Stat. 395	H.R. 3363	Jimmy Carter
August 16, 1985	P.L. 99-93	99 Stat. 405	H.R. 2068	Ronald Reagan
October 28, 1991	P.L. 102-138	105 Stat. 647	H.R. 1415	George H. W. Bush
October 24, 1992	P.L. 102-499	106 Stat. 3264	H.R. 6047	George H. W. Bush
October 25, 1994	P.L. 103-415	108 Stat. 4299	H.R. 5034	Bill Clinton

== See also ==
- Smith–Mundt Modernization Act of 2012
- Fulbright–Hays Act of 1961
