= Surplus Property Act =

- Long title: An Act to aid the reconversion from a war to a peace economy through the distribution of Government surplus property and to establish a Surplus Property Board to effectuate the same, and for other purposes.
- Nicknames: Surplus Property Act of 1944
- Enacted by: the 78th United States Congress

Citations
- Public law: Pub. L. 78–457
- Statutes at Large: 58 Stat. 765, Chap. 479

Codification
- Titles amended: 50a U.S.C.: War and National Defense
- U.S.C. sections created: 50 Appendix U.S.C. §§ 1611-1646

Legislative history
- Introduced in the House as H.R. 5125 by William M. Colmer (D–MS) on June 23, 1944; Signed into law by President Franklin D. Roosevelt on October 3, 1944

Major amendments
- Fulbright Act of 1946

Surplus Property Act of 1944 (ch. 479, 58 Stat. 765, 50A U.S.C. § 1611 et seq., enacted October 3, 1944) is an act of the United States Congress that was enacted to provide for the disposal of surplus government property to "a State, political subdivision of a State, or tax-supported organization". It authorized a three-member board, known as the Surplus Property Board, a structure that was replaced within a year by an agency run by a single administrator. Many of its provisions were repealed on July 1, 1949.

== See also ==
- War Assets Administration
- Law Enforcement Support Office
