= FRIENDSHIP Act of 1993 =

- Long title: An Act for reform in emerging new democracies and support and help for improved partnership with Russia, Ukraine, and other new independent states of the former Soviet Union.
- Nicknames: FRIENDSHIP Act
- Enacted by: the 103rd United States Congress
- Effective: December 17, 1993

Citations
- Public law: 103-199
- Statutes at Large: 107 Stat. 2317

Codification
- Titles amended: 22 U.S.C.: Foreign Relations and Intercourse; 50 U.S.C.: War and National Defense
- U.S.C. sections amended: 22 U.S.C. ch. 33 §§ 2458, 2460, 2461; 22 U.S.C. ch. 55 § 4501 et seq.; 22 U.S.C. ch. 67 § 5801 et seq.; 50 U.S.C. ch. 23 § 781 et seq.; 50a U.S.C. § 2401; 50a U.S.C. § 2402; 50a U.S.C. § 2403-1

Legislative history
- Introduced in the House as H.R. 3000 by Dick Gephardt (D-MO) on August 6, 1993; Committee consideration by House Armed Services, House Banking, Finance, and Urban Affairs, House Foreign Affairs, House Intelligence (Permanent), House Judiciary, House Post Office and Civil Service, House Ways and Means; Passed the House on November 15, 1993 (Passed voice vote); Passed the Senate on November 22, 1993 (Passed voice vote, in lieu of S. 1672) with amendment; House agreed to Senate amendment on November 23, 1993 (Agreed without objection); Signed into law by President Bill Clinton on December 17, 1993

The FRIENDSHIP Act of 1993 was enacted as a law of the United States enhancing prior statutory provisions which govern international relations between the former Republics of the Soviet Union and United States during the Cold War. The Act of Congress reformed United States statutes related to:

- Armament export controls as related to military technology transfer limitations
- Continental cultural and educational exchange
- Cooperative foreign trade relations
- Diplomatic relations with foreign allies
- Global environmental shifts
- Immigration and nationality requirements
- International products exports
- Societal propagandization as related to multicultural social ideology

H.R. 3000 was passed by the 103rd United States Congressional session and enacted into law by the 42nd President of the United States Bill Clinton on December 17, 1993.

== Titles of the Act ==
The 1993 Act was penned as nine titles establishing purposeful foreign relations as related to the development of emerging democracies and improved multinational partnerships.

=== Title I: Policy of Friendship and Cooperation ===
Statement of purpose
Findings
Statutory provisions that have been applicable to the Soviet Union.

=== Title II: Trade and Business Relations ===
Policy under Export Administration Act
Representation of countries of Eastern Europe and the Independent States of the former Soviet Union in legal commercial transactions
Procedures regarding transfers of certain Department of Defense-funded items
Soviet slave labor

=== Title III: Cultural, Educational, and Other Exchange Programs ===
Mutual Educational and Cultural Exchange Act of 1961
Soviet-Eastern European research and training
Fascell Fellowship Act
Board for International Broadcasting Act
Scholarship programs for developing countries
Report on Soviet participants in certain exchange programs

=== Title IV: Arms Control ===
Arms Control and Disarmament Act
Arms Export Control Act
Annual reports on arms control matters
United States/Soviet direct communication link

=== Title V: Diplomatic Relations ===
Personnel levels and limitations
Other provisions related to operation of consulates and embassies
Foreign Service Buildings Act

=== Title VI: Oceans and the Environment ===
Arctic Research and Policy Act
Fur seal management
Global climate protection

=== Title VII: Regional and General Diplomatic Issues ===
United Nations assessments
Soviet occupation of Afghanistan
Angola
Self determination of the people from the Baltic States
Obsolete references in Foreign Assistance Act
Review of United States policy toward the Soviet Union

=== Title VIII: Internal Security; Worldwide Communist Conspiracy ===
Civil defense
Report on Soviet press manipulation in the United States
Subversive Activities Control Act
Report on Soviet and international communist behavior

=== Title IX: Miscellaneous ===
Ballistic missile tests near Hawaii
Nondelivery of international mail
State-sponsored harassment of religious groups
Murder of Major Arthur D. Nicholson
Monument to honor victims of communism

== See also ==
Arctic policy of the United States
Communist Control Act of 1954
Containment
Former Soviet Union Demilitarization Act of 1992
Freedom Support Act
Helsinki Accords
Korean Air Lines Flight 007
Mount Alto Embassy Site
National Captive Nations Committee
National Museum of American Diplomacy
Omnibus Foreign Trade and Competitiveness Act
Partnership for Peace
Samantha Smith
Soviet anti-religious legislation
Soviet Nuclear Threat Reduction Act of 1991
Victims of Communism Memorial Foundation
World Trade Organization
