= War Assets Administration =

Former United States government agency

The War Assets Administration (WAA) was created to dispose of United States government-owned surplus material and property from World War II. The WAA was established in the Office for Emergency Management, effective March 25, 1946, by Executive Order 9689, January 31, 1946. It was headed by Robert McGowan Littlejohn.

The WAA was abolished by the Federal Property and Administrative Services Act (63 Stat. 738), June 30, 1949. It was succeeded by the General Services Administration, as liquidator.

== Predecessor agencies ==
- Petroleum Reserves Corporation (PRC), Reconstruction Finance Corporation (RFC, June–July 1943)
- PRC, Office of Economic Warfare (OEW, July–September 1943)
- PRC, Foreign Economic Administration (FEA, September 1943-September 1945)
- PRC, RFC (September–November 1945)
- War Assets Corporation (WAC), RFC (November 1945-March 1946)
- Surplus War Property Administration (SWPA), Office of War Mobilization (OWM, February–October 1944)
- Surplus Property Board (SPB), Office of War Mobilization and Reconversion (OWMR, October 1944-September 1945)
- Surplus Property Administration (SPA), OWMR (September 1945-March 1946)

== Functions ==
The WAA disposed of surplus consumer, capital, and producer goods; industrial and maritime real property; and airports and aircraft located in the United States and its territories. American factories had produced massive amounts of weaponry during World War II. Hundreds of thousands of tons of surplus military equipment, from mess kits to tanks, airplanes, machine guns, artillery, and even warships, were offered for sale as scrap by the WAA. Other items were sold for immediate use by consumers in their homes, vehicles, and businesses. In addition, government-owned industrial plants, airfields, and other real property was sold or turned over. Even patents, industrial processes, manufacturing techniques, and inventions were declared surplus and put up for sale.

Below are a few examples of surplus assets distributed by the WAA:

- Agricultural machinery
- Aircraft, built for military transport, purchased by airline carriers for commercial use
- Artillery factory, then converted by the new owners to produce electrical cords
- Books
- Coal
- Fabric
- Factories built for war-time production, purchased by their lessees to continue production for civilian trade
- Gliders
- Gulfport Army Airfield was converted to commercial use, and is now the Gulfport–Biloxi International Airport
- Hospital on a closed Army base became Alaska's first dedicated tuberculosis sanitorium
- Mules and horses
- Power station, to be operated as a public utility
- Snow chains for trucks and passenger cars
- Trucks
- Waste containers
