= Lacy-Zarubin Agreement =

Academic and cultural exchange treaty between the United States and the Soviet Union

The Agreement Between the United States of America and the Union of Soviet Socialist Republics on Exchanges in Cultural, Technical, and Educational Fields
- Type: Cultural agreement
- Signed: January 27, 1958
- Location: Washington D.C.
- Effective: 10 January 1920
- Expiration: December 25, 1991
- Signatories: William S.B. Lacy; Georgy Z. Zarubin
- Parties: United States; Soviet Union
- Languages: English and Russian

The Lacy-Zarubin Agreement, also known as the Agreement Between the United States of America and the Union of Soviet Socialist Republics on Exchanges in Cultural, Technical, and Educational Fields, was a bilateral agreement between the United States and the Soviet Union on various fields including film, dance, music, tourism, technology, science, medicine, and scholarly research exchange. The agreement was signed on 27 January 1958 in Washington, D.C., negotiated between William S.B. Lacy, the U.S. President's Special Assistant on East-West exchanges and Georgy Zarubin, Soviet ambassador to the United States.

The Lacy-Zarubin Agreement was renegotiated every two years, and during the detente, the duration was extended to three years. The final agreement was signed by Ronald Reagan and Mikhail Gorbachev, at the 1985 Geneva Summit, and the agreement was in effect until the Soviet collapse.

== Historical context ==
Before the Lacy-Zarubin agreement was established, at the Foreign Minister's Conference in Geneva in October 1955, the United States, Britain, and France proposed to remove the barriers to “information media, culture, education, books, and publications, science, sports, and tourism” exchange.

The United States proposed an exchange program to the Soviet Union once during World War II and after the War in October 1945. However, it was rejected by the Soviet Union on both accounts. However, Soviet Foreign Minister Vyacheslav Molotov was interested in some notions of the exchanges resulting in the Soviets suggesting a bi or multilateral agreement that involved some of the proposed programs. Upon Stalin's death in 1953, the Soviet Union began to actively welcome Western artists into the country. Notably, Soviet cities Moscow and Leningrad invited the American musical Porgy and Bess during their 1955 tour in Europe.

The agreement was established during the ‘Thaw’ of the Cold War, an era of peaceful co-existence or temporary relaxation in political tension between the US and Soviet Union. Nikita Khrushchev was a notable figure in the Soviet government who actively worked to reform the repressive policies of the Stalin regime. In February 1956, at the Twentieth Congress of the Communist Party of Soviet Union, Khrushchev's speech criticized Stalin's foreign policy and showed indications of changing attitude towards the West and indicating peaceful co-existence. Since then, the Soviets started to sign cultural agreements with the West, including with Norway, Belgium, France, and the United Kingdom and followed by the United States.

While American citizens actively shunned peacetime propaganda during and after the world wars, tensions between the Soviet Union resulted in gradual support of exporting American culture, technology and way of life. With the start of the 1950s, President Dwight D. Eisenhower continued efforts from Truman to engage the on-site exchange of professionals. In August 1954, Eisenhower created state-sponsored tours of American artists to Soviet regions with the purpose of “maxim[izing] psychological impact.” This was funded by the President's Emergency Fund for the Arts.

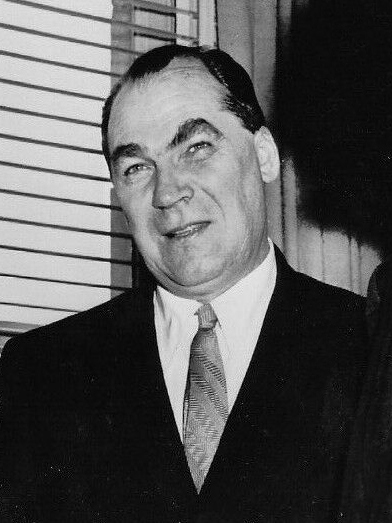
Georgy Zarubin in 1956

== Negotiations ==
While attempts for exchanges between the United States and the Soviet Union began as early as 1945 by President Truman, negotiations to solidify an actual agreement did not start until the summer of 1957. Nikita Khrushchev began advocating for an exchange agreement with the United States early in the summer. He believed this would help reaffirm his nation's status as a global superpower comparable to the United States. In October 1957, formal negotiations with William S. B. Lacy, president's special assistant on East-West exchanges, and Georgy Zarubin, the Soviet ambassador to the United States, began in Washington for exchange agreements. On January 27, 1958, the final agreement was signed.

=== United States objectives ===
The United States was fuelled by a motivation to expand its administrative relationship with Soviet institutions in an attempt to improve its understanding of the isolated country and promote detente through cooperation and interdependence. This was paired with the potential for technological, scientific, cultural and educational advancements from long-term cooperation. American acceptance of the agreement “signified a policy shift away from an aggressive strategy of the liberation of the Soviet bloc to a gradualist approach.”

While there existed an East-West Contacts Staff in the United States State Department at the time, the United States was required to sign an official agreement amidst increasing reciprocal interaction with the Soviet Union. It was an executive agreement, and unlike a treaty, it did not require U.S. Senate's ratification.

=== Soviet Union objectives ===
Due to its centralized government, the Soviets required an official agreement to plan and assign the budget for the exchange activities. The agreement also provided the protection and justification for the responsible Soviet agencies.

The Soviet Union was motivated by acquiring American knowledge and skill, fast-tracking its technological and scientific advancements in the field. It also sought to improve the Western world's view of the relatively isolated Soviet Union as a country open to cooperation and peace equal to that of the United States. At the time, domestic artists, scholars, scientists had called for more interactions with foreign contact. Thus, the Soviet government utilized the agreement to give in to their demands while demonstrating Soviet achievements to the outside world to be recognized as equally prestigious to the U.S. Soviet approach to the agreement signified an acceptance of expanding the cultural relations openness to foreign influence.

== Implementations ==
For the agencies of the exchange, there was a partnership between the U.S. government and the private sector, while all the Soviet agencies were governmental. Many of the U.S. exchanges, including “science and technology, radio and television, motion pictures, publishing, youth, education, performing arts, athletics, and tourism” were conducted by the private sector. The partnership reduced the costs for the exchange for the U.S. government, and the private sector had the approval to exchange with the most developed in the communist world. For the Soviets, all these exchange agencies were governmental. Soviet's international exchanges were not managed by private sectors and needed to be supervised by the state's political authority.

Both the U.S. and the Soviet public supported the cultural exchange under the broad framework of the agreement. There was minimal opposition from the Congress, and the exchange was welcomed by the civil society, including academia, the media, science community, churches, sports organizations and associations, the industries, and the general public support. The U.S. had a “lukewarm reception,” most evident in conservative media outlets. The agreement was also widely covered in the Soviet press and enjoyed public support.

== Cultural exchange ==
Cultural exchanges proved to be one of the many efficient ways of engaging in cultural and propaganda warfare for both the United States and the Soviet Union. This practice stemmed from well before the Cold War, during the Second World War. The Lacy-Zarubin Agreement aided in furthering cultural ties between two countries while pushing forth their agendas of spreading communism or democracy to emerging new countries by providing opportunities for cultural expansion. On top of musical and theatrical exchanges, both countries sent dancers, hosted sports competitions featuring their respective athletes, and allowed for the engagement of film and production companies.

=== Film ===
The Lacy-Zarubin agreement set up film trades, exchanges, and co-productions between the American and Soviet film industries, marking growth in film diplomacy between the two states. It allowed Sovexportfilm, the Soviet Union's most prominent film export/import organization, to engage with and learn from American production companies in Hollywood.

Representatives from both parties had to engage in several rounds of negotiations to finalize specific details of the agreement pertaining to film, as the first section on film trade included vague diction such as "equality" and "mutually acceptable financial terms". To determine how these principles were to be implemented, a permanent committee of 2 representatives from each party was established. They met four times during their mandated year, twice in Moscow and twice in Washington.

The initial negotiations began on March 25, 1958, at the Motion Pictures American Association (MPAA) headquarters in Washington D.C. Eric Johnston, president of MPAA, led the U.S. delegation, along with MPAA vice-president Kenneth Clark and head of the USIA film department Turner Shelton. Four people made up the Soviet delegation: deputy head of the Ministry of Culture Vladimir Surin, the vice-chief of the Ministry of Culture's foreign relations department Aleksandr Slavnov, director of Sovexportfilm Aleksandr Davydov and his aide Yevgenii Kachugin. The first round of negotiations resulted in little success for either party. When discussing the number of films that each country sold to the other, the Soviet delegation insisted on equality. At the same time, the U.S. side argued that this was not feasible as the American film industry produced 400 features each year while the Soviets produced at less than a quarter of that rate. Furthermore, the Soviets would not agree to return a share of sales to American studios, which led the U.S. delegation to raise their prices ($250,000 to $1 million) while offering no more than $20,000 for most Soviet films. The negotiations ended when Johnston proposed an 8:5 U.S. to Soviet film ratio on the final day, which the Soviet delegation firmly rejected.

The second round of negotiations started about six months later, on September 16, 1958, when the delegation met in Moscow. For the Soviets, choosing American films was time-consuming as they had to be largely apolitical or compatible with the government's ideology while appealing to audiences. Almost two weeks on, the Soviet delegation had not yet selected the American films they wanted to purchase. Johnston feared that the negotiations would end without a deal again. To try to avoid leaving empty-handed, he requested a meeting with Khruschev, which took place on October 6. Three days later, a deal was finally agreed upon. The Soviets proposed the U.S. to Soviet film ratio of 10:7, and both parties were to pay approximately $60,000 for the other's feature films. For the U.S., significant investment was needed to promote Soviet films, but for the Soviets, American films cost little to advertise as their popularity in the box office was assured. In the United States, The 1960-61 version of the Lacy-Zarubin agreement left the studios to directly engage in most of the negotiations rather than through the State Department.

=== Dance ===
The performing arts exchange was conducted through the American commercial impresarios, such as the Legendary Sol Hurok and Columbia Artists Management.

==== The Moiseyev Dance Company ====
The Moiseyev Dance Company, formally known as the State Academic Ensemble of Folk Dances of the Peoples of the USSR, first visited the United States in April 1958. Performing in large cities such as New York, Chicago, Los Angeles, Washington, Boston and Philadelphia, the dancers represented the Soviet Union to Americans who had never been exposed to Soviet culture, evoking both positive and negative responses from over forty million people in North America. Despite the ongoing efforts of Senator Joseph McCarthy in what is known as McCarthyism and the House Un-American Activities Committee to strictly distinguish American values from Communist identity, the Dance Company became a nationwide sensation, resulting in mail orders of over $180,000 before the box office opened a few weeks before the first show. The Soviet government meticulously chose the Moiseyev Dance Company to represent the face of the regime through the Lacy-Zarubin Agreement. It aimed to paint a positive image of the Soviet Union as a uniform yet multicultural state. It thus was captured in the Dance Company's incorporation of dances from Ukraine, Azerbaijan, Kazakhstan, Mongolia, Poland, Hungary and others.

=== Music ===
Both the United States and the Soviet Union sent several musicians to either country to spread the cultural significance of each respective country. The United States’ Philadelphia Symphony Orchestra made its way to the Soviet Union in May 1959, while individual Soviet artists Gilels, Kogan, Petrov, Lisitsian, Dolukhanova, Bezrodni and Ashkenazi visited the United States the same year.

=== Jazz ===
In particular, the United States consciously sent many jazz musicians on tours throughout the Soviet Union after the Agreement came into place. The State Department sold tickets to overseas performances, provided material recordings for radio stations to broadcast, and spread information about jazz stories to newspapers worldwide. As was the case with the Moiseyev Dance Company, this was done carefully calculated by the United States government in its efforts to push forward the trope of the country as multicultural, friendly and anti-racist.

=== Exhibitions ===
The fourth and final form of cultural exchange between the Soviet Union and America was holding exhibitions. This was known as a "reverse tourism" form that brought foreign experiences, images, and products to the population.

One of the most famous exhibitions was in New York and Moscow in 1959. The Americans set up a six-week exhibition about consumer goods in Sokolniki Park. This stimulated admiration and curiosity amongst the public and sparked the well-known "Kitchen Debate" between Khrushchev and Nixon. The Central Committee of the Communist Party of the Soviet Union (CPSU) charged Zhukov's GKKS with preventing the exhibition's use by the United States "for anti-Soviet propaganda.”

== Technical exchange ==
=== Science and technology ===
Science and Technology exchange was the most controversial topic of the US-USSR exchange. The Lacy-Zarubin Agreement prioritized cooperation through “coordinated scientific research programs and other activities in health fields of mutual interest; exchanges of specialists and delegations; organization of colloquia, scientific conferences, and lectures; exchange of information; and familiarization with technical aids and equipment.” There were five components of the exchange of science and technology:

1. The exchange program for graduate students through the Inter-University Committee and the Inter-University Committee on Travel Grants (IUCTG), International Research and Exchanges Board (IREX), and the Soviet Ministry of Higher Education.
2. The exchange program for senior scholars in humanities and social science between ACLS and Soviet Academy.
3. Industry, agriculture, and medicine exchange lasted for two weeks.
4. The agreement between the U.S. National Academy of Science and the Soviet Academy of Science in 1959. This agreement provided an exchange of scientists. The scientists lectured, conducted seminars and advanced studies, and researched. This agreement was annexed to the cultural agreement.
5. Memorandum of Cooperation between the U.S. Atomic Energy Commission and the USSR State Committee on the Peaceful Uses of Atomic Energy was also signed in 1959 and annexed to the cultural agreement.

=== Health and Medical Cooperation ===
In January 1956, the Poliomyelitis epidemic occurred in the Soviet Union, leading to the Soviet's recognition of Western science and its accomplishments. The United States Public Health Service made visits to help make the vaccine, and 12 million children received the vaccine between 1957-1960. From there on, “[m]utual polio exchanges between the US and USSR have continued, and the disease has nearly been eradicated in the Soviet Union.” After the Lacy-Zarubin Agreement was signed in January 1958, it provided exchanges of delegations of health specialists, individual lecturers, medical journals, and medical films.” They first worked on eradicating Malaria in cooperation with the World Health Organization.

== Educational exchange ==
=== Context: US-USSR scholarly negotiations ===
Eisenhower primarily wanted to invite ten thousand Soviet scholars to the U.S., but his advisors, such as FBI Director J.Edgar Hoover, raised concerns about their domestic impact.

The initial US-USSR scholarly exchange was limited to twenty graduate students per year. An increase from twenty exchange students to thirty occurred the following year. After the first two years, the quota rose to 50 students. For scholarly exchange, many of them were graduate students, young faculty members, and senior scholars.

=== Funding ===
The Soviet Academy of Sciences and Ministry of Higher Education picked and funded Soviet participants to head to the U.S.

IUCTG picked and funded the American participants that headed to the Soviet Union.

For the U.S., educational exchanges were funded by the State Department's Bureau of Educational and Cultural Affairs and participating universities. They were administered by the IUCTG based at Indiana University until the IREX took over in 1968.

The participating American universities also funded the exchange program by waiving the tuition, housing, and other school fees for the incoming Soviet students. The Ford Foundation supports the funding of the early years' scholarly exchanges. On the Soviet side, all the funding was done through governmental organs.

=== Programs under the agreement ===
The main program was the exchange of Graduate students and Young Faculty. Educational exchanges began with twenty students from each country during the 1958-1959 academic year, and most of these participants were graduate students. After two years, the number of exchange students rose to 50 students.

The graduates spent one or two semesters researching as exchange scholars. There were postdoctoral exchange programs as well. The program exchanges ten or more senior research scholars for two to five months. There were language exchanges as well. Summer Language Teacher Program exchanged 30 to 35 language teachers of the U.S. and the Soviet for nine weeks during summer.

In addition, there was an immense competitive travel grant for American graduate students pursuing research careers in Music, Musicology, and Ethnomusicology to study in Moscow. Only about one-third of the roughly 60 applicants were accepted for this program throughout the 1960s and 1970s. The State Department rigorously screened all applicants to ensure "steeped in the American tradition" and possessed "political maturity and emotional stability." The successful candidates include Theodore Levin, Richard Taruskin, and several other future-influential scholars in Soviet and Russian music studies.

=== More exchange programs: IREX and Fulbright ===
IREX also conducted the exchange between the U.S. ACLS, Social Science Research Council and the Soviet Academy of Science. The exchange program administered up to sixty postdoctoral scholars for several months per year.

From 1975, IREX conducted "collaborative research, conferences, and workshops between ACLS and the Soviet Academy under their bilateral Commission on the Humanities and Social Science." This agreement allowed University lecturers to be exchanged under the Fulbright Program in 1974.

=== Differences between U.S. and USSR educational exchange ===
Most American scholars were in their mid-twenties and researched humanities and social science, especially Russian history, language, and literature, for their doctorate. American exchange candidates went through an open competition to be selected by IUCTG and IREX.

The agreement was strongly supported by Slavic studies programs at universities. Thus, more humanities students went on exchange from the U.S. to the Soviet Union.

Most Soviet scholars were in their thirties, and more science and technology scholars went from the Soviet Union to the U.S. Soviet candidates were not selected by open competition but by an interagency governmental committee's evaluation based on the Soviet economy's needs.

There were rejections of the nominees in most years. The U.S. turned down Soviet's high technology scholars whose field is closely related to defence technology. The Soviets turned down the U.S. scholars whose field was sensitive to contemporary Soviet topics. In later years of IREX, the Soviets eventually allowed the U.S. scholars in social science.

=== List of Soviet Scholars ===
- Alexander N. Yakovlev
- Oleg Kalugin
- Boris Yuzhin
- Yuri Afanasyev
- Rem Khokhlov
- Nikolai Sivachev
- Boris Runov

=== Lists of United States scholars ===
- Bernard Gwertzman
- Alexander Dallin
- Alfred Rieber
- Terence Emmons
- Michael Cole
- Herbert Ellison
- George Demko
- Peter B. Maggs
- Robert Sharlet
- Irwin Weil
- James Muller

== Renewal and duration ==
The agreement was renegotiated every two years. During detente, the duration of the agreement was extended to three years.

The title of the agreement was modified a few times at renewal. When the second agreement was signed in 1959, science and technology were moved before culture, and the word "cooperation" was added. The renewed title read: "Agreement between ... for Cooperation in Exchanges in the Scientific, Technical, Educational and Cultural Fields in 1960-61". The third agreement was signed in 1962, which included the addition of "...and Other Fields" at the end of the title. The final amendment to the title was made in 1973, when it was changed to "General Agreement between ... on Contacts, Exchanges and Cooperation in Scientific, Technical, Educational, Cultural and Other Fields."

The Soviets and the US periodically renegotiated the agreement and its programs, which required long effort. For example, negotiations for the third agreement in the series lasted three months until the two countries reached a consensus on provisions.

Furthermore, despite the escalation of economic and military competition between the parties throughout the Cold War, the programs were never suspended.

Ronald Reagan and Mikhail Gorbachev signed the final agreement at the Geneva Summit, and the agreement was in effect until the Soviet collapse.

== Impact ==
American acceptance of the agreement “signified a policy shift away from an aggressive strategy of the liberation of the Soviet bloc to a gradualist approach.” Soviet acceptance of the agreement signified an acceptance of expanding cultural relations and an openness to foreign influence. Positive research and academic results benefited the public, business, and government circles.

While the Science and Technology exchange did not happen on a large scale under the Agreement, they contributed to establishing the US-USSR scientists’ linkage that prepared for expanded Science and Technology exchanges during detente.

The agreement also marked the beginning of more open and frequent travel, as it allowed for direct flights between the US and the Soviet Union. This was a desirable benefit for the Soviet Union, as there was pent-up demand for travel since they had been relatively isolated from the rest of the world until the late 1930s. Government officials were among the many people who wanted to travel to the West, including Khruschev, who went on a widely-publicized visit to the US in 1959.

== Legacy ==
The Lacy-Zarubin Agreement had lasting influences on how the United States and the Soviet Union perceived one another's culture, identity and overall representation. In particular, the Moiseyev Dance Company, which became the first official group to participate in the cultural exchange from the Soviet Union to the United States, helped depict a somewhat positive perception of the Soviet Union in American citizens. On the other hand, the United States utilized jazz to set a multicultural image of the country, contrary to the racism and internal turmoil still felt domestically.

The Agreement also helped to further clarify the driving motivations behind the two countries' leaders. First Secretary of the Communist Party Nikita Khrushchev was known to be less repressive than Stalin and thus was open to the idea of Western culture to coexist with the United States peacefully. The United States was focused on propagating its image as the world leader, translating into the eventual creation of the United States Information Agency in 1953.

== See also ==
- CIA and the Cultural Cold War – Propaganda campaigns waged by both the United States and the Soviet Union
