= Patriot Express =

Airline of the United States

The Patriot Express (PE), formerly known as a CAT B flight, is a United States government contract flight which provides support to United States Armed Forces members and their families. Flights are operated by various commercial airlines and provide service worldwide, mainly across the Pacific and Europe.

== About ==
Air Mobility Command, the air component of United States Transportation Command (USTRANSCOM), manages the PE program on behalf of the United States Department of Defense. The PE program was advertised as being more economical for the United States government while freeing United States Air Force planes for primary military missions. In addition, using chartered commercial aircraft eliminates potential hardships that could arise if a higher priority mission was to divert a military aircraft. Military personnel and their families can also take advantage of the program for Space-A travel.

== Pacific routes ==
Across the Pacific, the PE program uses Boeing 767 commercial aircraft. These flights arrive and depart from the Seattle-Tacoma International Airport in the United States. They serve Yokota Air Base, Misawa Air Base, Marine Corps Air Station Iwakuni, and Kadena Air Base in Japan as well as Osan Air Base in Korea. A PE to Andersen Air Force Base in Guam was added in March 2020. The Guam mission is a 6-month "proof of principle."

== European routes ==
European routes originate at the Baltimore/Washington International Airport in the United States, stop in Europe, then continue on to Southwest Asia before returning. Space-A travel is not allowed on routes to and from combat zones.

== Inflight service ==
Inflight service on board PE flights is similar to that on normal commercial aircraft, providing such amenities as business class meals, inflight movies, snacks, and reserved seating. Several of the changes were made in 2003 in an effort to attract more passengers to the program.

== Drawdown ==
At one point the PE system handled over 340,000 passengers a year, with more than two-thirds of the seats on the contracted aircraft filled by passengers on Permanent Change of Station orders. In 2005, citing cost, flexibility and empty seats, the Department of Defense began to scale down PE service over a period of several years. Flights to South Korea and Okinawa were eliminated and other routes reduced. This required servicemembers and their families to take commercial flights to and from the affected locations.

In February 2010, USTRANSCOM announced that it would resume services to South Korea in April and add flights to Japan.
