= 303rd Intelligence Squadron =

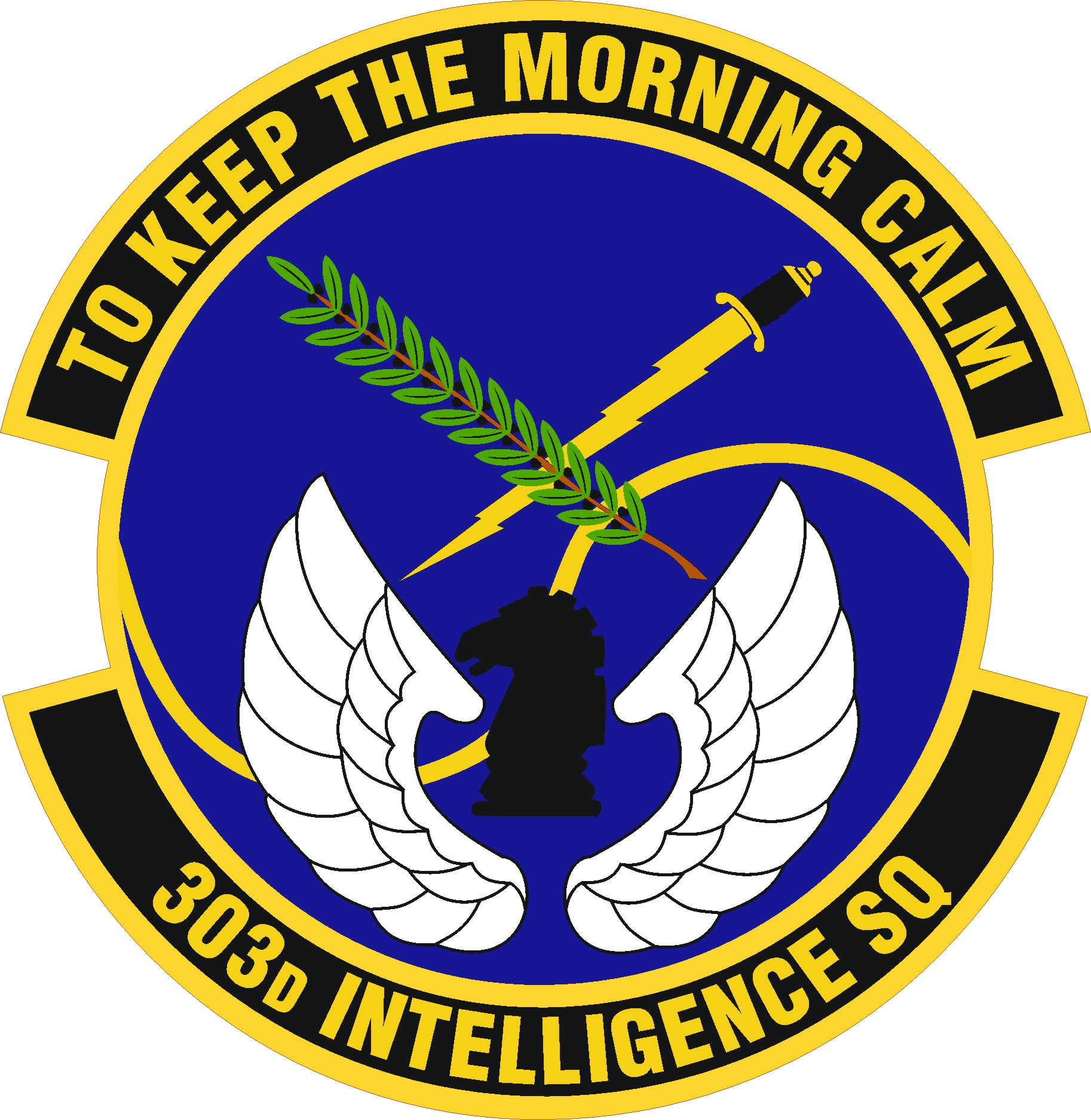
- 303rd Intelligence Squadron emblem (approved 18 May 2012)
- Active: 1970–present
- Country: United States
- Branch: United States Air Force
- Type: Intelligence Squadron
- Role: Military Intelligence
- Garrison/HQ: Osan Air Base, Korea
- Nickname: "Skivvy Nine"
- Motto: To Keep the Morning Calm
- Decorations: Air Force Outstanding Unit Award with Combat "V" Device; Air Force Outstanding Unit Award; Republic of Korea Presidential Unit Citation

Insignia
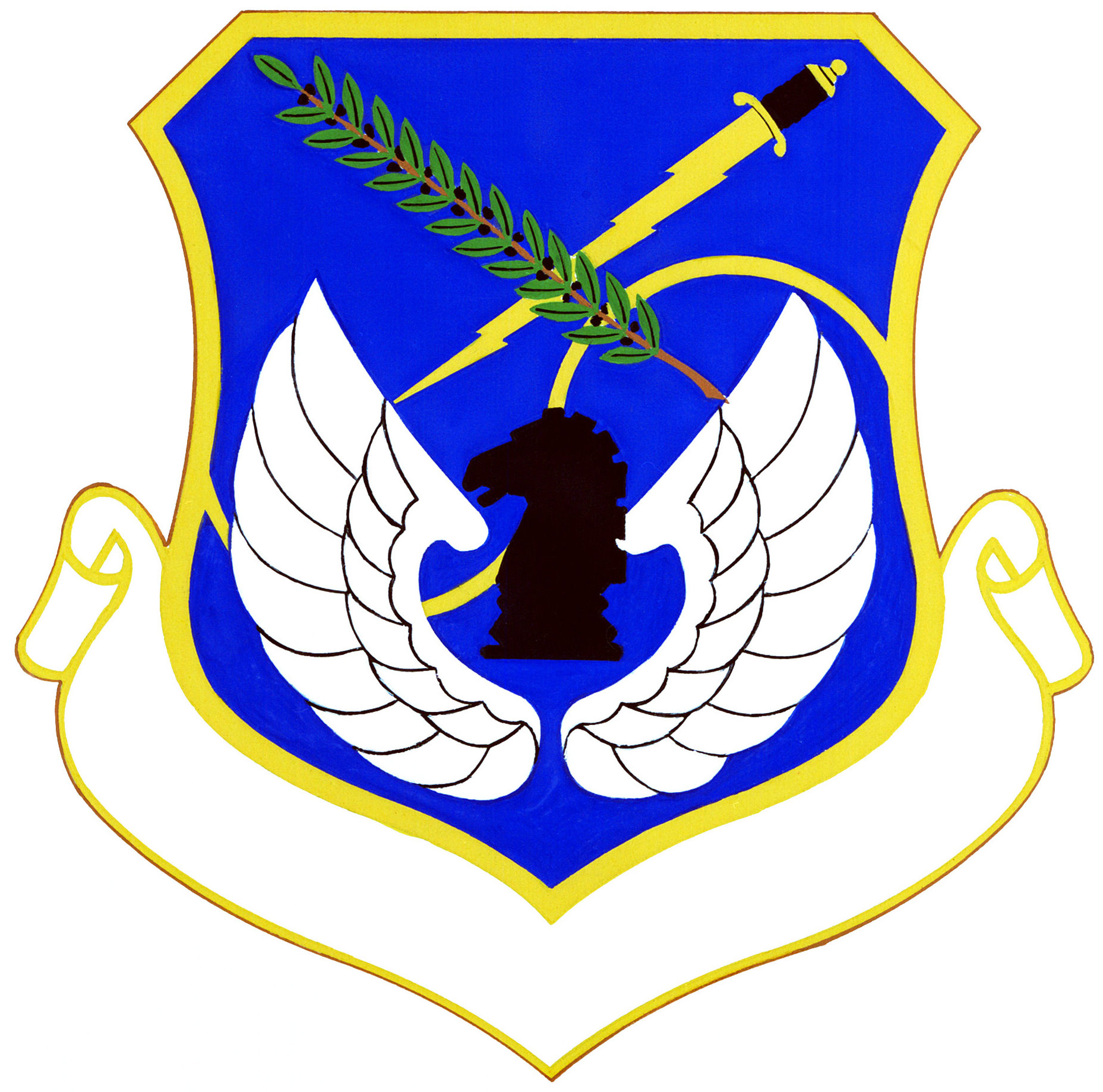
- 6903rd Electronic Security Group emblem (approved 21 June 1982)

303rd Intelligence Squadron (303 IS) is an intelligence unit of the United States Air Force located at Osan AB, South Korea. Also known as "Skivvy Nine," the squadron is a tenant unit of the 51st Fighter Wing, although it is operationally a component of the 480th Intelligence Wing. Most Skivvy Nine operations occur in the Korean Combined Operations and Intelligence Center (KCOIC). Together with the 6th Intelligence Squadron, the 303rd Intelligence Squadron comprises Distributed Ground Station 3 (DGS-3), a component of the Air Force Distributed Common Ground System. Founded 22 November 1950, the 303rd Intelligence Squadron is one of the most historic units in the U.S. Air Force, providing timely cryptologic support since the Korean War.

== Lineage ==
- Designated as the 6903rd Security Squadron and activated on 1 May 1970
- Redesignated 6903rd Electronic Security Squadron on 1 August 1979
- Redesignated 6903rd Electronic Security Group on 1 October 1981
- Redesignated 303rd Intelligence Squadron on 1 October 1993

=== Assignments ===
- Pacific Security Region, 1 May 1970
- Pacific Security Region (1 May 1970 – 30 September 1980)
- USAF Security Service (later Electronic Security Command), 31 Dec 1972
- Electronic Security, Pacific (later Pacific Electronic Security Division, 692nd Intelligence Wing, 692nd Intelligence Group, 692nd Information Operations Group, 692nd Intelligence Group), 30 September 1980
- 694th Intelligence, Surveillance and Reconnaissance Group (30 September 1980 – Present)
- 694th Intelligence Group (later 694th Intelligence, Surveillance, and Reconnaissance Group), 1 April 2008 – present

=== Stations ===
- Osan Air Base, Republic of Korea, 1 May 1970 – present

=== Awards ===
- Air Force Outstanding Unit Award with Combat "V" Device

1 June 2002 – 31 May 2003

- Air Force Outstanding Unit Award

1 May 1970 – 1 April 1971
2 April 1971 – 1 April 1972
1 January 1976 – 30 June 1977
1 July 1978 – 30 June 1979
1 July 1979 – 30 June 1981
1 July 1991 – 30 June 1993
1 October 1993 – 30 September 1994
1 October 1994 – 30 September 1995
1 October 1995 – 30 September 1996
1 October 1997 – 30 September 1998
1 October 1999 – 30 September 2000
1 June 2001 – 31 May 2002
1 June 2003 – 30 September 2004
1 October 2004 – 31 May 2005
1 June 2007 – 31 May 2009
1 June 2009 – 31 May 2011

- Republic of Korea Presidential Unit Citation

19 August 1972 – 20 August 1972
