= 731 Squadron =

731 Squadron may refer to:

- 731 Naval Air Squadron, United Kingdom
- 731st Airlift Squadron, United States
- 731st Air Mobility Squadron, United States
- 731st Expeditionary Attack Squadron, United States
- 731st Radar Squadron, United States
