= Osan Air Base =

United States Air Force - Korea Air Force base in Pyeongtaek, South Korea

- Korean: 오산공군기지; Hanja: 烏山空軍基地
- Near Pyeongtaek, Gyeonggi Province in South Korea
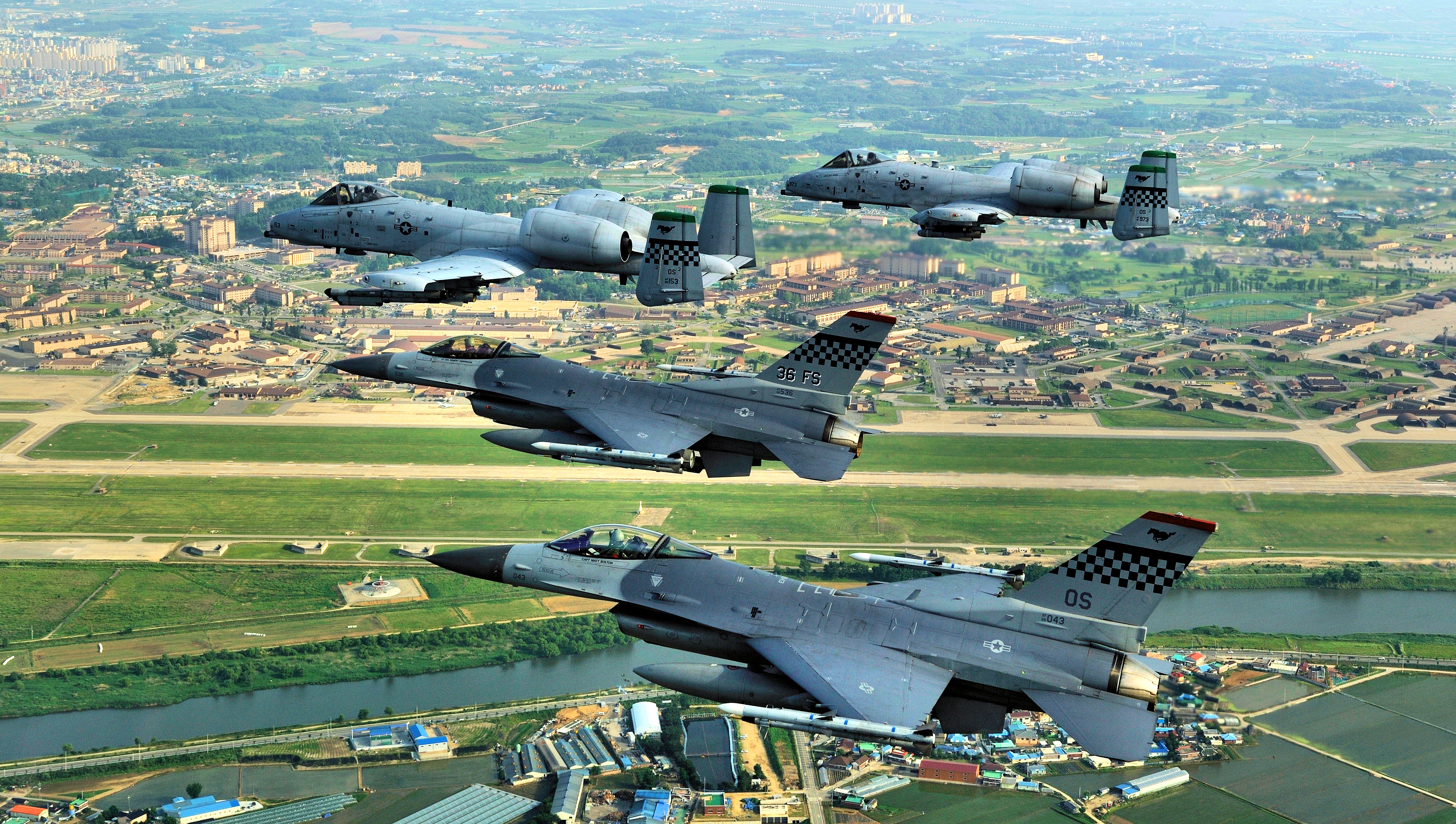
- US Air Force F-16C Fighting Falcon and A-10A Thunderbolt II aircraft of the 51st Fighter Wing flying over Osan Air Base in June 2009.

Site information
- Type: US/ROK Air Force base
- Operator: US Air Force; Republic of Korea Air Force
- Controlled by: Pacific Air Forces (PACAF); Republic of Korea Air Force
- Condition: Operational
- Website: www.osan.af.mil

Location
- Location within Asia Location within Korea Location within South Korea Location within North Pacific
- Coordinates: 37°05′26″N 127°01′47″E

Site history
- Built: 1951 (as Osan-Ni Air Base or K55)
- In use: 1951 – present

Garrison information
- Current commander: Colonel Joshua Wood.
- Garrison: 51st Fighter Wing (Host)

Airfield information
- Identifiers: IATA: OSN, ICAO: RKSO, WMO: 471220
- Elevation: 12 metres (39 ft) AMSL
Runways
Direction	Length and surface
09L/27R	2,744 metres (9,003 ft) Concrete
09R/27L	2,744 metres (9,003 ft) Concrete

Osan Air Base (IATA: OSN, ICAO: RKSO) (K-55; Korean: 오산공군기지; Hanja: 烏山空軍基地) is a United States Air Force (USAF) and Republic of Korea Air Force (ROKAF) base located near Songtan station in the city of Pyeongtaek, South Korea, 64 km (40 mi) south of Seoul. Despite its name, Osan AB is not within Osan City, which is 7.5 km (4.7 mi) to the north. The base is the home of the headquarters for Seventh Air Force, Pacific Air Forces' 51st Fighter Wing, and a number of tenant units. The base is also the headquarters of the Republic of Korea Air Force (ROKAF) Operations Command. Osan Air Base is also the departure and arrival point for U.S. government-contracted "Patriot Express" flights bringing service members and their family members to South Korea from Seattle-Tacoma International Airport in the U.S. state of Washington, Misawa Air Base and Yokota Air Base in Japan.

As the most forward deployed permanently based wing in the Air Force, and equipped with A-10 Thunderbolt IIs and F-16 Fighting Falcons (about 48 aircraft), the 51st Fighter Wing is charged with executing combat operations, receiving follow-on forces and defending the base from attack. As the air component to United States Forces Korea and Combined Forces Command, 7th Air Force provides the command and control structures and personnel necessary to deliver precise, persistent, combined air and space power in defense of the Republic of Korea.

Osan Air Base is one of two major U.S. Air Force installations operated by U.S. Forces Korea, the other being Kunsan Air Base.

== History ==
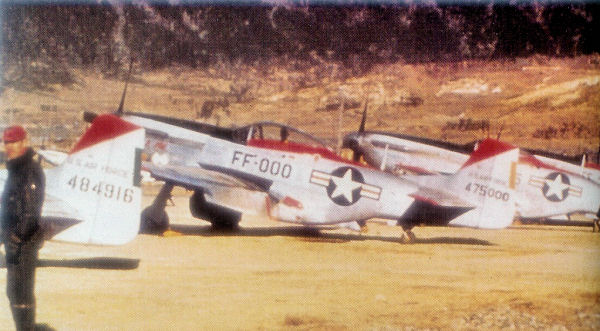
North American F-51D-25-NT Mustangs of the 67th Fighter-Bomber Squadron (18th FBG). AF Serial No. 44-84916 and 44-75000 identifiable.

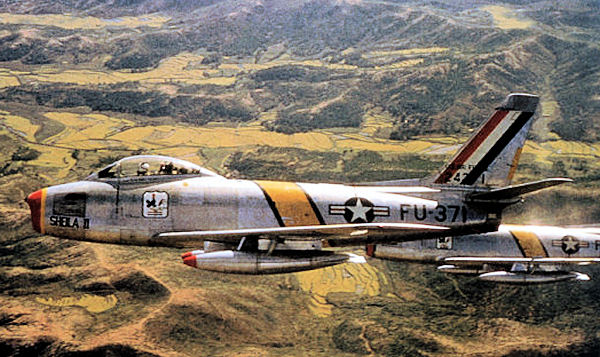
North American F-86F-25-NH Sabre AF Serial No. 52-5371 of the 18th Fighter-Bomber Group, 1953. Aircraft marked as Wing Commander's.

=== Korean War ===
Osan Air Base is one of two major airfields operated by the USAF in the Republic of Korea and the only base on the peninsula entirely planned and built from scratch by Aviation Engineers (SCARWAF) units attached to the USAF during the Korean War.

In the spring of 1951, the Korean People's Army and Chinese People's Volunteer Army were driven back north of the 38th parallel, and resulted in the return of Fifth Air Force tactical fighter units to peninsula. The 934th Engineer Aviation Group was tasked with building an air base capable of supporting jet fighters. They decided upon the area in the Chinwichon River flood plain, near the village of Osan-ni. Established in November 1951, the base originally was named Osan-Ni AB. The name "Osan-Ni" was chosen for practical reasons – it was the only village shown on most military maps of the time, and it was easy to pronounce.

The 839th Aviation Engineer Battalion began construction of base support facilities and infrastructure early in 1952. On July 9, 1952, the 839th, joined by the 840th and 841st Engineer battalions (Reserve engineer units called up for active duty, the 840th from Tennessee and the 841st from Florida), all part of the 934th Engineer Aviation Group, started work to lay the airfield's runway, taxiway and parking ramps. Monsoon rains, though, impeded initial efforts to fill the rice paddies and begin airfield construction. The delay forced engineers to work 24 hours a day, seven days a week beginning in August. They completed laying a 9,000-foot (2,700 m), 8-inch-thick (200 mm) concrete runway in 2 1/2 months. With the taxiway also completed, and parking ramps nearing completion, the 18th Fighter-Bomber Wing and one of its F-51 Mustang combat squadrons arrived on December 26, 1952. With the wing's other two squadrons arriving shortly thereafter, the wing converted to the F-86F Sabre.

In February 1953, the 18th FBW began flying air superiority missions from Osan-Ni AB which continued through the remainder of the Korean War.

=== Cold War ===
With the Korean Armistice Agreement signed on July 27, 1953, the 18th FBW remained at Osan-Ni AB for defensive purposes until November 1954. Meanwhile, plans called for HQ Fifth Air Force (Advance) to move from Seoul National University to Yongsan Garrison in Seoul. This plan was changed, and in January 1954, the headquarters relocated to Osan-Ni AB, and established the base as the major hub of operations for U.S. air power in South Korea.

As the Armistice took hold, the USAF redeployed all but one tactical fighter wing from the peninsula, and in November 1954, after Fifth Air Force relocated to Tokyo, the 314th Air Division replaced its former advanced headquarters at Osan-Ni AB. The 58th Fighter-Bomber Wing moved from Daegu AB to Osan-Ni AB in March 1955, and became the only permanently assigned tactical fighter wing in South Korea. On September 18, 1956, the base was redesignated Osan AB, its current name.

In July 1958, the U.S. Air Force inactivated the 58th Fighter-Bomber Wing. At this time, the Eisenhower Administration promulgated a nuclear deterrence strategy. Osan AB thus became the main base of operations for air-to-ground Matador tactical missiles when the 310th Tactical Missile Squadron and 58th Support Squadron were activated under the 58th Tactical Missile Group.

Concurrently, Fifth Air Force complemented this strategy by instituting rotational deployments of fighter aircraft units to Osan and Kunsan ABs from its Far East bases and the U.S. to bolster the defense of the South Korea as it steadily trained and equipped the ROKAF. Although the Matador missiles were relocated in 1962, fighter deployments continued throughout the 1960s.

Other than a major reconstruction of the runway in 1959, the base still retained its Korean War-vintage facilities and infrastructure. There was no money spent on improving the facilities. The U.S. focused on Cuba due to the Cuban Missile Crisis and on Europe as the most important part of the Cold War. Korea was forgotten. On base the barracks were still the corrugated iron barracks of the Korean War and the base simply stagnated with the 6314th Air Base Wing in charge of not only Osan, but also Kunsan as well. This condition changed modestly beginning in 1968.

Starting in September 1964, Osan AB was home to Det 4, 36th Air Rescue Squadron of the Military Air Transport Service (MATS). The unit flew the HH-43B Huskies. Two HH-43Bs were assigned to Osan AB (aircraft 60-251 and 60-252) as of September 1964 under the Air Rescue Service (ARS) based in the Pacific Air Force (PACAF) region. Det 4, 36 ARS (MATS) became Det 9, Provisional Air Rescue Component (PARC) on 25 July 1965 and remained with this designator until 8 January 1966.

MATS was redesignated as the Military Airlift Command (MAC) in 1969 and in December 1969, the designator changed to Det 4, PARRC (MAC). The unit designator of Det 9, 41st Air Rescue and Recovery Wing (MAC) was also maintained from February 1969 through June 1970.

=== Pueblo crisis ===
The North Korean seizure of the USS Pueblo on January 23, 1968, precipitated deployment of 1,000 Air Force personnel, on temporary duty status, to Osan AB in support of Operation Combat Fox. Airmen stationed at bases in the US, and Asia (including South Vietnam) began arriving on January 25, within 48 hours of the attack. Many found that they would have temporary quarters in Korean War vintage tents in below zero weather conditions without cold weather clothing. The developing crisis underscored the importance of the installation at Osan, and led to the infusion of funds for improving existing facilities and the construction of new structures including aircraft shelters and control tower. Security was upgraded in support of the increased tactical operations at the base. From January to March, over 6,500,000 pounds of cargo was shipped by rail to Osan. Conventional munitions transported in converted coal cars, arrived 24 hours a day.

On 22 March the 318th Fighter Interceptor Squadron deployed to Osan AB from McChord AFB, Washington. This marked the first time in history that Aerospace Defense Command (ADC) F-106 fighter interceptors had flown to a critical overseas area, using in-flight refueling along with tactical air units.

Although the Pueblo crisis subsided with the crew's release on December 23, 1968, fighter unit deployments occurred on a regular basis. On April 15, 1969, the North Koreans again triggered a period of tension when it shot down a U.S. Navy EC-121 Warning Star flying in international airspace over the Sea of Japan. F-106s from the 95th Fighter Interceptor Squadron, deployed to Osan AB from 15 November 1969 – 1 May 1970. Attached to Fifth Air Force ADVON, 15 November 1969 – 1 May 1970.

The response by the U.S. resulted in another increase of fighter forces on the peninsula, and eventually set the stage for return of permanently assigned fighter units to South Korea.

=== Vietnam War ===
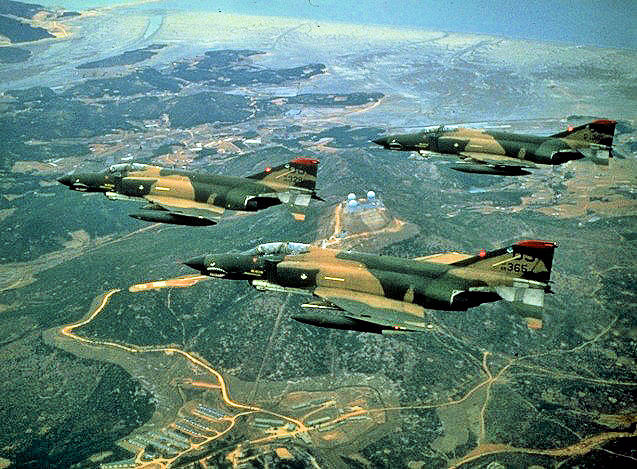
Three 36th Fighter Squadron F-4E Phantom IIs in flight. AF Serial No. 68-0328 and 68-0365 identifiable.

Throughout this period, the U.S. Air Force was deeply committed to the Vietnam War.

At Osan, the major USAF units were 6145th Air Force Advisory Group acting as a training/logistical support unit to the ROKAF; the 314th Air Division; and the 6314th Support Wing. The 611th Military Airlift Command Support Squadron (611th MASS) at Kimpo Air Base would later move to Osan.

However, as the U.S. withdrew incrementally from South Vietnam and Thailand, Pacific Air Forces repositioned its force structure which led to substantial changes for the USAF in South Korea. On March 15, 1971, the 3rd Tactical Fighter Wing was activated at Kunsan AB. At Osan AB, PACAF activated the 51st Air Base Wing to assume host-unit responsibilities at Osan AB on November 1, 1971. Two weeks later, on November 13, 1971, the 3rd TFW's 36th Tactical Fighter Squadron moved to Osan AB.

Total withdrawal of U.S. forces from South Vietnam by March 1973 resulted in another important change for Osan AB. On September 30, 1974, the 51st ABW was redesignated as the 51st Composite Wing (Tactical), and assigned the 36th TFS with its F-4D/E Phantom IIs and the 19th Tactical Air Support Squadron with its OV-10As.

=== 1970s/1980s ===
With Osan AB serving as the nucleus for more than 20 USAF activities in South Korea, it experienced a period of facility and infrastructure changes during the 1970s. Although many of the Korean War vintage structures remained, new dormitories were built, and a new headquarters complex completed in 1974 for the 314th AD and 51st CW(T) replaced 71 Quonset huts that were destroyed by fire three years earlier. In 1979 and 1980, construction of on-base family housing and additional community-support facilities gave the base a sign of stability.

Establishment of the Combined Forces Command in 1978 further set the future of Osan AB. The evolving role of USAF's CFC mission in South Korea led to activation of Headquarters Seventh Air Force on September 8, 1986. It replaced the 314th AD as the U.S. Air Force component command.

Construction on Osan AB during the 1980s was dictated largely by mission changes and enhancements, and the threat from North Korea. Introduction of the F-16 Fighting Falcon in 1988 led to construction of hardened aircraft shelters, a new on-base munitions storage area, and upgrades to unaccompanied personnel housing.

The presence of U-2 reconnaissance aircraft was classified until 1978, though the planes could be seen at takeoff and landing.

=== Post-Cold War ===
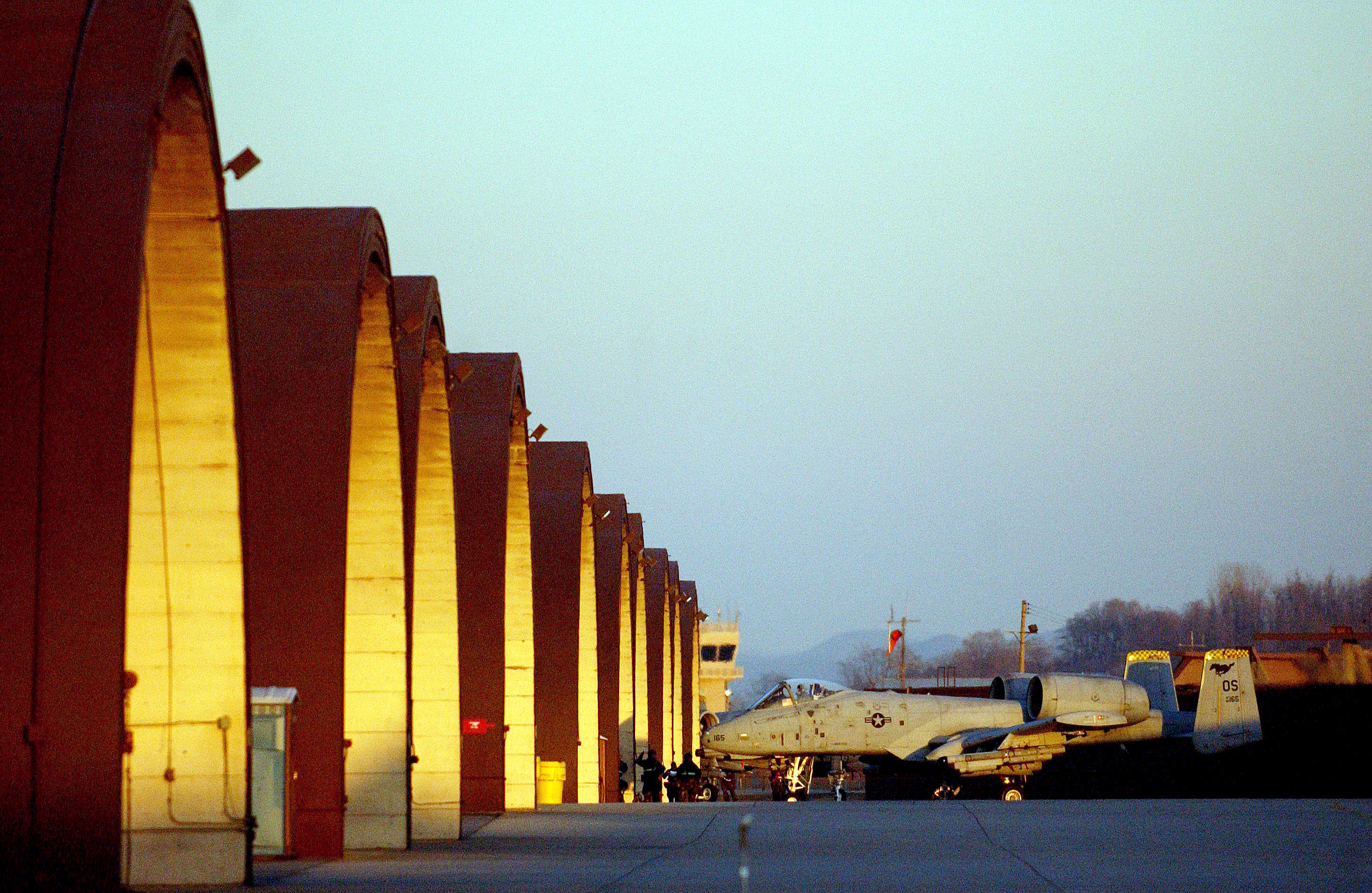
An A-10 Thunderbolt II taxis into a hardened "hot pit" refueling shelter at Osan Air Base

While the face of Osan AB slowly changed in replacing its 40-year-old Korean War-vintage structures, the base experienced a lengthy period with little or no military construction program projects. However, other funding sources allowed base officials to add community-type facilities. Arrival of the 25th Fighter Squadron and its A/OA-10s in October 1993 and two MIM-104 Patriot batteries in May 1994 also necessitated some new construction. Other than these events, base officials primarily concentrated on improvements in facility protection due to the threat from North Korea's reliance on medium-range SCUD missiles. Annual runway repairs furthermore only attested to the aging of Osan AB as the base witnessed only modest changes in its structural appearance during the 1990s.

It was not until 1998 that HQ PACAF renewed emphasis on improving the base's support structure. Increasing infrastructure failures seriously detracted the 51st Fighter Wing from conducting its deterrence mission. HQ PACAF subsequently provided the base with funds under the "Fix Korea Initiative." More than $200 million was invested in upgrading or replacing the water, sewage and electrical distribution systems over the following six years. Additionally, mid- and long-range plans for the base foresaw a dramatic facelift of Osan AB that included new on-base family housing, new community-support facilities, and replacement of many industrial structures that supported the 51st FW mission.

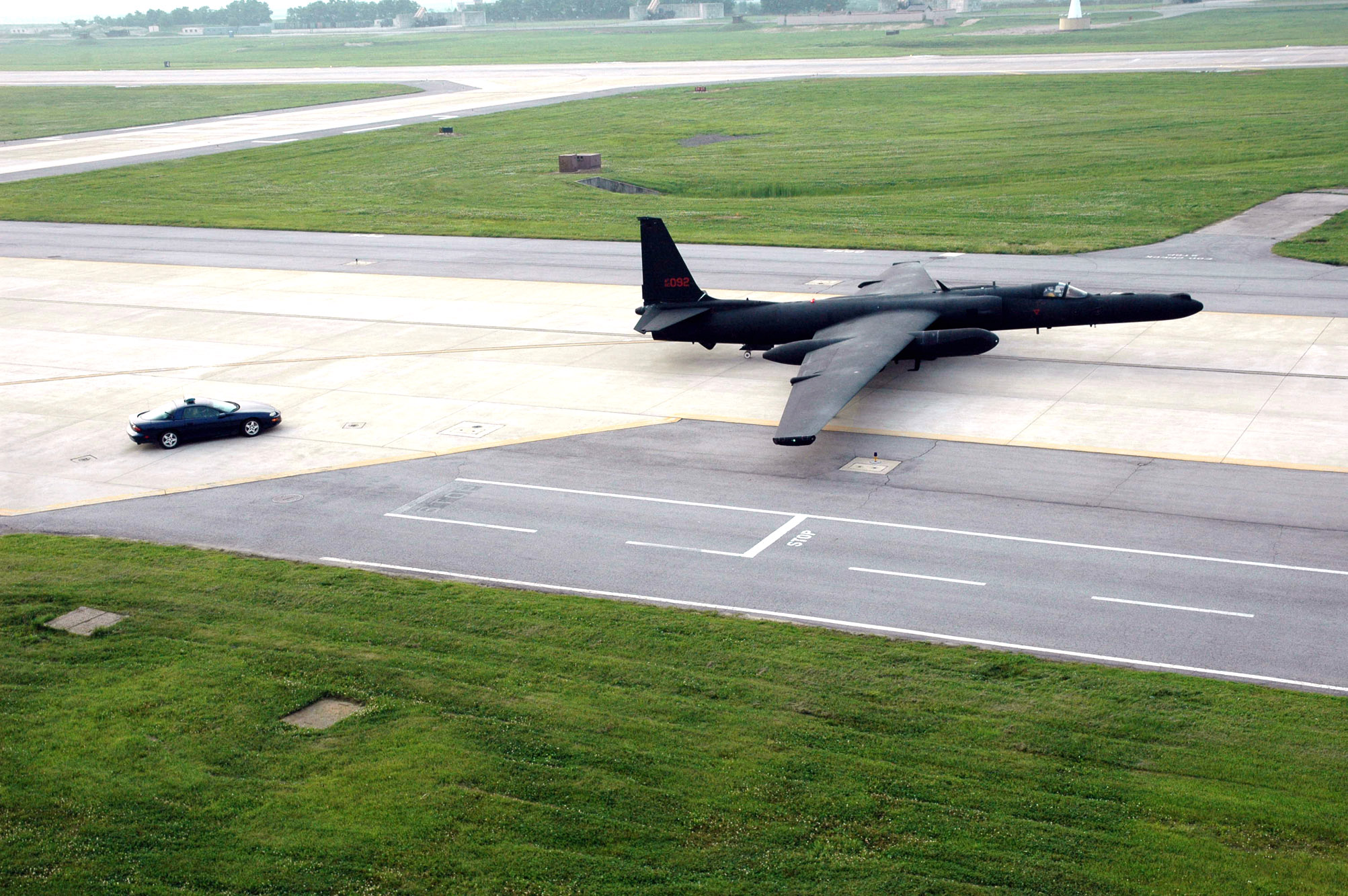
The improved U-2S Dragon Lady, Block 20, aircraft taxis to the runway at Osan Air Base

As South Korea's military grew and matured into a formidable force by the late 1990s, political and military leaders from both countries reexamined the role of U.S. forces based on the peninsula. A major change in U.S. strategic policy coinciding with the 9/11 terrorist attacks required a "transformation" of global U.S. military commitments and basing. The military had to adapt from a fixed, in-garrison-type force to a mobile, responsive force. For its part, U.S. Forces in Korea studied how technological advances in weaponry could mitigate a reduction in personnel while the ROK military forces carried out an increasing role to protect its sovereignty. The result of this effort led to the landmark agreement known as the Land Partnership Plan in 2002 and the Security Policy Initiative in 2003 between the U.S. and the South Korean governments. These decisions reflected a realignment in the roles and missions of USFK that forecast a significant reshaping and growth at Osan AB through 2011. The 607th Combat Operations Squadron was dissolved.

In December 2009, South Korea's JoongAng Daily newspaper reported that the RQ-170 Sentinel was to replace U-2s operating from Osan Air Base in 2010.

In 2012, a bronze bust of General James Van Fleet's son, James Van Fleet Jr., was erected to honor all US Airmen who died during the Korean War. Van Fleet Jr. had died in 1952 during a bombing mission near Haeju (now in North Korea).

On December 1, 2014, a lockdown in the high school and middle school occurred as an active shooter drill went off.

On May 28, 2015, the USAF said that as many as 22 people were inadvertently exposed to anthrax during a laboratory training exercise.

In August 2025, US President Donald Trump expressed interest in buying the base land rather than leasing it. In July 2026, a leak of white phosphorus at the base triggered temporary evacuations in nearby neighborhoods.

=== Major USAF units assigned ===
- 18th Fighter-Bomber Wing (December 1952 – November 1954)
- 30th Weather Squadron (January 1954 – May 1957)*
- Fifth Air Force (January – September 1954)
- 314th Air Division (March 1955 – November 1978, April 1979 – September 1986)
- 335th Fighter-Bomber Squadron (February 1955)**
- 334th Fighter-Bomber Squadron (March 1955)**
- 58th Fighter-Bomber Wing (March 1955 – July 1958)
- 58th Tactical Missile Group (July 1958 – March 1962)
- 51st Fighter Wing (November 1971–present)
- Seventh Air Force (September 1986–present)
- Defense Media Agency-American Force Network Osan (September 1957–present)

* Detached from the 2143rd Air Weather Wing based at Tageu AB (K-2), South Korea
** Detached from the 4th Fighter-Bomber Wing based at Chitose AB, Japan

Kunsan has provided support for F-51D Mustang, F-86 Sabre, F-84 Thunderjet, F-4 Phantom II, F-106 Delta Dart, OV-10 Bronco, A-10 Thunderbolt II, and F-16 Fighting Falcon operations.

== Based units ==
Flying and notable non-flying units based at Osan Air Base.

Units marked GSU are Geographically Separate Units, which although based at Osan, are subordinate to a parent unit based at another location.

=== United States Air Force ===
Pacific Air Forces (PACAF)

- Seventh Air Force
  - Headquarters Seventh Air Force
  - 51st Fighter Wing
    - Headquarters 51st Fighter Wing
    - 51st Operations Group
      - 25th Fighter Squadron – A-10C Thunderbolt II
      - 36th Fighter Squadron – F-16C/D Fighting Falcon
      - 51st Operations Support Squadron
    - 51st Mission Support Group
      - 51st Civil Engineer Squadron
      - 51st Communications Squadron
      - 51st Force Support Squadron
      - 51st Logistics Readiness Squadron
      - 51st Security Forces Squadron
    - 51st Maintenance Group
      - 51st Aircraft Maintenance Squadron
      - 51st Maintenance Operations Squadron
      - 51st Maintenance Squadron
      - 51st Munitions Squadron
    - 51st Medical Group
      - 51st Aerospace Medicine Squadron
      - 51st Bioenvironmental Engineering Squadron
      - 51st Dental Squadron
      - 51st Medical Support Squadron
      - 51st Medical Operations Squadron
  - 607th Air Operations Center
    - 621st Air Control Squadron
  - 607th Air Support Operations Group
    - 607th Air Communications Squadron
    - 607th Air Support Squadron
- Fifth Air Force
  - 18th Wing
    - 18th Operations Group
      - 33rd Rescue Squadron
        - Detachment 1 (GSU) – HH-60G Pave Hawk

Air Combat Command (ACC)

- Sixteenth Air Force
  - 9th Reconnaissance Wing
    - 9th Operations Group
      - 5th Reconnaissance Squadron (GSU) – U-2S Dragon Lady
  - 480th Intelligence, Surveillance and Reconnaissance Wing
    - 694th Intelligence, Surveillance and Reconnaissance Group (GSU)
      - 6th Intelligence Squadron
      - 303rd Intelligence Squadron
      - 694th Intelligence Support Squadron

Air Mobility Command (AMC)

- United States Air Force Expeditionary Center
  - 515th Air Mobility Operations Wing
    - 515th Air Mobility Operations Group
      - 731st Air Mobility Squadron (GSU)

=== United States Army ===
US Army Pacific (USARPAC)

- Eighth Army
  - 94th Army Air and Missile Defense Command
    - 35th Air Defense Artillery Brigade – MIM-104 Patriot
  - 3rd Battlefield Coordination Detachment

=== United States Space Force ===
United States Space Forces – Korea (USSPACEFOR-KOR)

=== Republic of Korea Air Force ===
- Air Force Operations Command (공군작전사령부)
- Air Defense Missile Command (공군방공유도탄사령부)
- Air Defense Control Command (공군방공관제사령부)
  - 1st Master Control and Reporting Center(1MCRC) (제1중앙방공통제소)
- Air Force Operation Information & Communication Wing (공군작전정보통신단)
- Air Intelligence Wing (AIW) (항공정보단)

== Amenities ==
=== Life In Osan ===
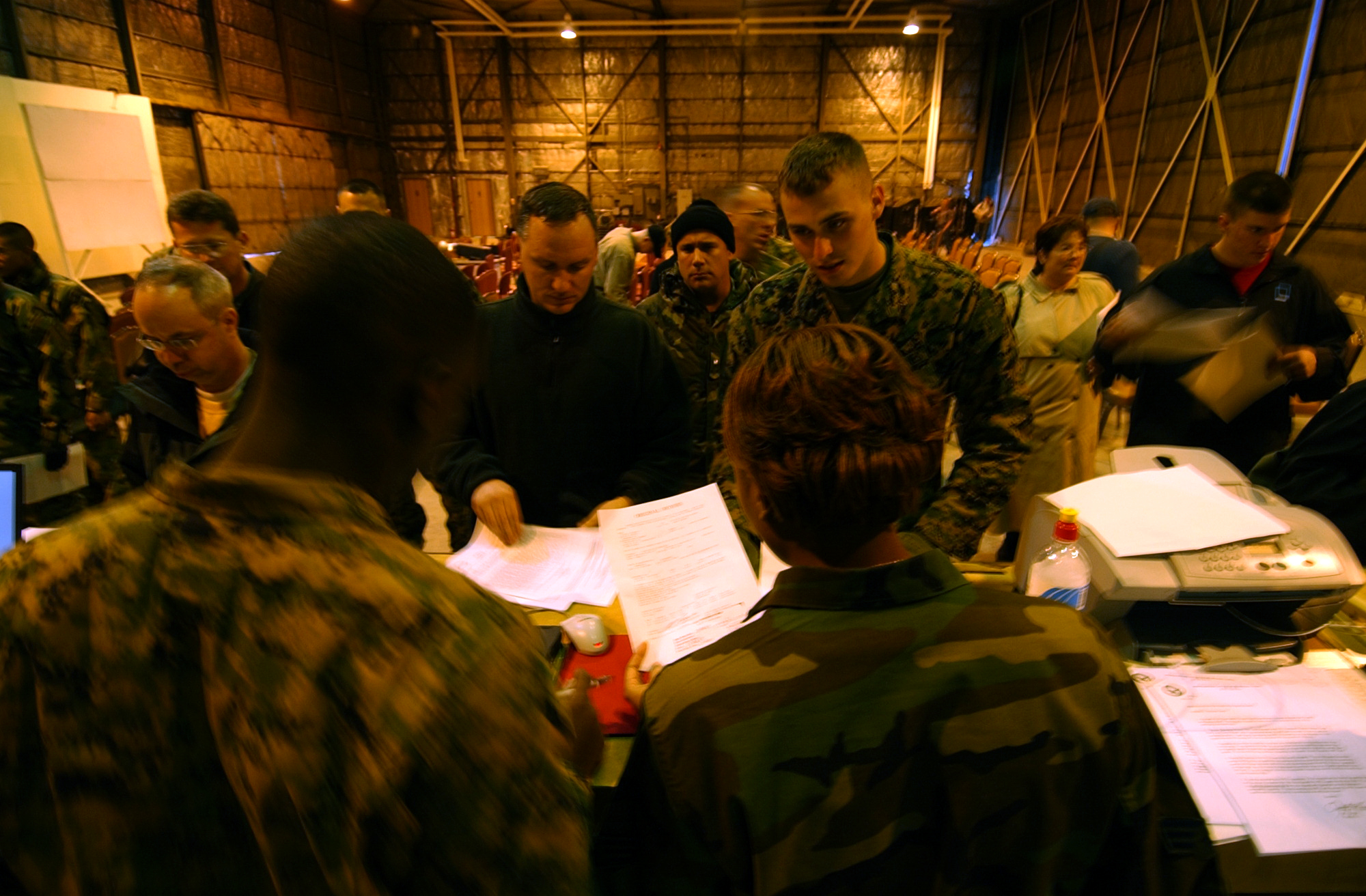
Joint Reception Personnel assigned to Osan Air Force Base, in preparation for RSO&I/Foal Eagle.

Most U.S. military members assigned to Osan AB serve a 1-year unaccompanied tour. If they elect to participate in the Korea Assignment Incentive Program, their tour is extended by one year, they receive a taxable bonus of $300 per month, but they lose the ability to have assignment preference due to a short tour and lose short tour credit. Roughly five percent of the military authorizations at Osan AB are designated as command-sponsored two-year accompanied tours, typically for senior ranking personnel and/or jobs which requires a tour longer than 12 months, due to military necessity. If an individual is placed in one they may bring their families at government expense. Housing on-base, even for command sponsored families, is still limited despite an aggressive family housing construction program. Those authorized to live off-base will receive an overseas housing allowance. There is an elementary school, named Osan American Elementary School; a middle school, named Osan Middle School as well as high school, known as Osan American High School the middle and high school are now conjoined). These schools are for command-sponsored children of military members. Contractors (even command sponsored) should be prepared to pay upwards of $25,000 a year for this privilege.

Some families choose to come without command sponsorship; these family members may use the facilities (including schools) on a space available basis. If family members come, they will be able to receive the local OHA rate, whether or not the servicemember makes the list to move off base and regardless of rank. The government will not pay for their transportation to Korea, in most cases.

Under normal circumstances, unaccompanied airmen live in one of the many dormitories on-base and eat in the dining facility, thereby receiving a meal deduction from their basic allowance for subsistence. Airmen receive cost of living adjustments (COLA) if living off base, and partial COLA if living in the dorms, which varies by rank, living situation, and dependents. E-5s and above may live off-base if NCO or officer dormitory space is not available; in some cases this has also been extended to higher ranking junior enlisted airmen (E-4s), depending on dormitory occupancy availability and policies in place at the time. The compact nature of Osan AB lends itself to walking and bicycling.

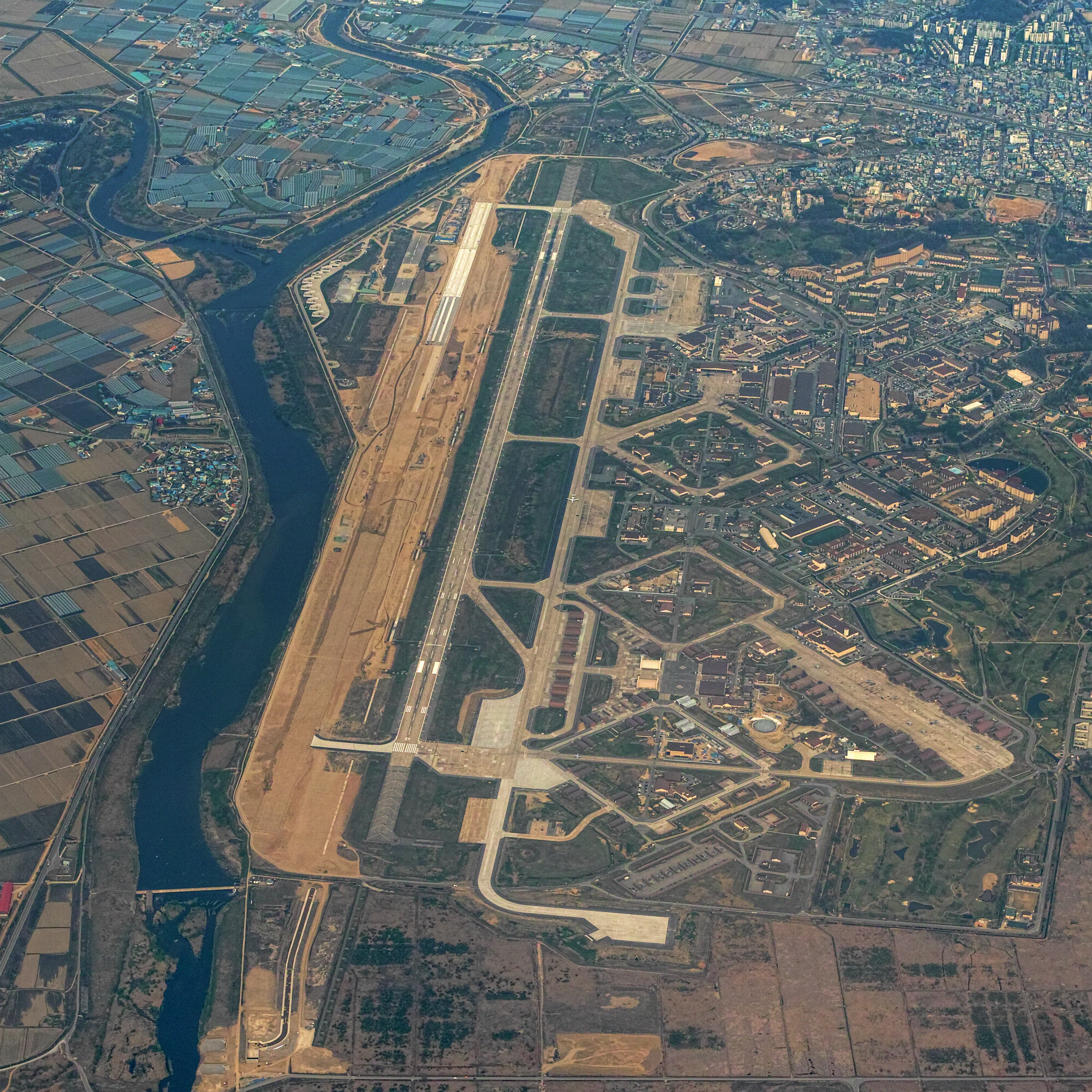
Osan AB, South Korea, 2014

For single and unaccompanied airmen, one of the attractions of a one-year assignment to Osan AB is the opportunity to follow their Osan tour with an assignment at the base of their choice, called a "follow-on assignment." If a position is open at the desired location, unaccompanied airmen in Korea (or other unaccompanied locations) have priority over other airmen in filling that position. This benefit is not available to those serving accompanied tours with family, or to those who extend their tours; those airmen must use the normal assignment selection process for their next assignment.

There are many bars and clubs off base, mostly in the Shinjang-dong district and many base members spend much leisure time at them. If the bars do not abide by certain standards, the Osan Military Beverage Control Board may place them off limits to military members. This is usually done when the bar is involved in certain unlawful activities, particularly prostitution.

Town Patrol, a section of the 51st Security Forces Squadron, patrols the area immediately outside the base alongside a Korean Augmentation To the United States Army and in cooperation with the Korean National Police, to ensure the safety of military members and enforce military law and regulations upon U.S. military members. On July 5, 2012, however, the Town Patrol caused a controversy by handcuffing three Pyeongtaek citizens in a dispute over illegal parking near the base. After inciting protests from civic groups, three members of the Osan Town Patrol were suspended from their duties, Gen. James D. Thurman, Commander of USFK, made a public apology for the incident.

=== Facilities ===
All facilities accept US dollars and some accept South Korean won; AAFES BX/Shoppettes and the DECA Commissary are the two notable exceptions that will only accept US dollars. With the exception of the US Post Office, pennies (1 cent pieces) are not circulated. All transactions are rounded up or down to the nearest nickel when giving change.

- Base Exchange (BX)
- Shopette
- Commissary
- Dining facilities

Ginko Tree
Pacific House (Pac House)

- Restaurants and other establishments

Chili's
Checkertails/Bada Bing Pizza (Formerly called OHOP)
Burger King (Relocated to behind BX)
Oriental House
Popeyes Chicken (Located in the same building as Burger King)

In the BX Mall

Taco Bell
Subway
Baskin-Robbins
Pizza Hut
Charley's
Arby's
Starbucks
Manchu Wok

At the Clubs (There are two enlisted clubs:
The Enlisted Club and the Mustang Club; there is one Officers Club)

The End Zone
Flying M Steak House
Bella Panini's
Challenger Club
Black Cat Lounge

- Recreation Facilities

Gym (open 24 hours)
Mustang Pool (indoor, closed indefinitely)
Defender Pool (outdoor – seasonal)
Paintball Court (small)
Golf Course
MiG Alley Bowling Alley (also has a restaurant)
Movie Theater

- Other facilities

Library
McPherson Community Center

== Education ==
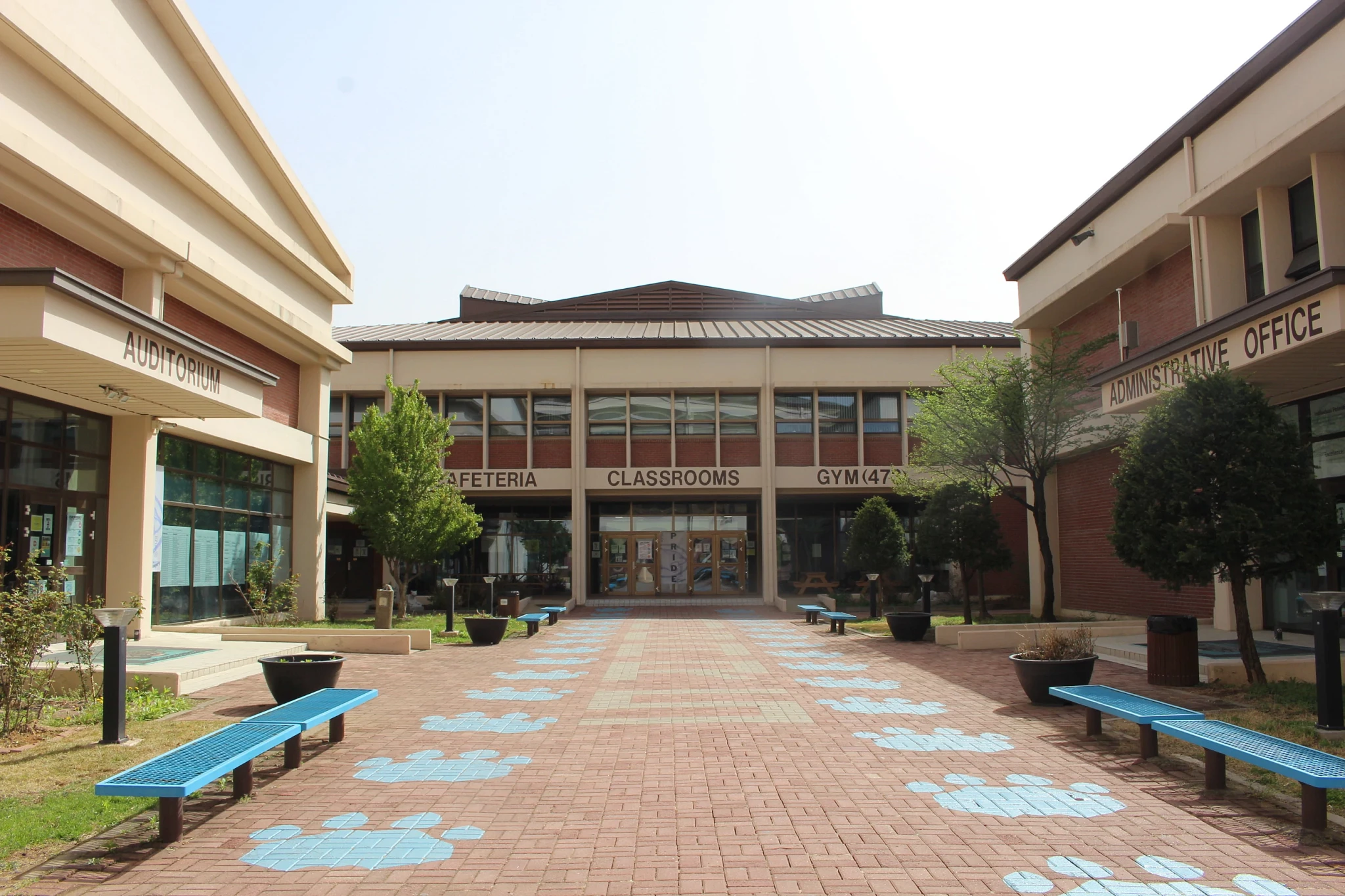
Interior of Osan Middle High School

Department of Defense Education Activity (DoDEA) facilities include:

- Osan Elementary School
- Osan Middle High School

== In fiction and literature ==
Osan Air Base is prominently featured in the 2011 military thriller Thunder in the Morning Calm by Don Brown. The Osan AB is also mentioned in The Interview (2014).

== See also ==
- Kunsan Air Base
- Camp Carroll
- Camp Humphreys
- Camp Red Cloud
- USAG Yongsan
