= 731st Air Mobility Squadron =

- Country: United States
- Branch: Air
- Size: 1 force
- Garrison/HQ: Osan Air Base

The 731st Air Mobility Squadron (731 AMS) is an air mobility squadron of the United States Air Force based at Osan Air Base in South Korea. It is part of the 515th Air Mobility Operations Group, based at Yokota Air Base, Japan and the 515th Air Mobility Operations Wing, based at Hickam Air Force Base, Hawaii.
