= 694th Intelligence, Surveillance and Reconnaissance Group =

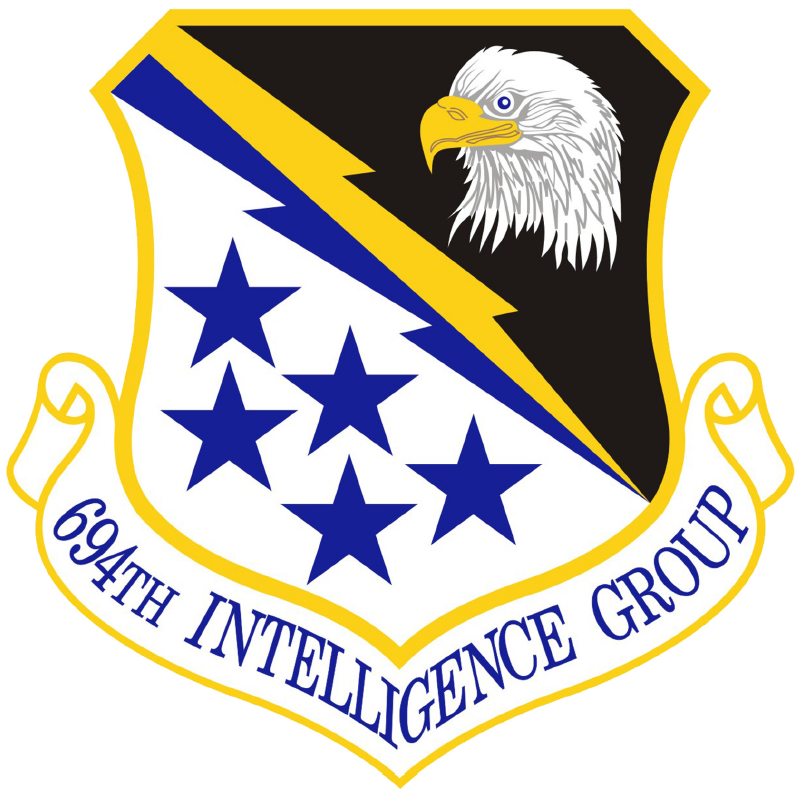
- 694th Intelligence, Surveillance and Reconnaissance Group emblem
- Active: 1988–2005; 2008 – present
- Country: United States
- Branch: United States Air Force
- Type: Intelligence
- Role: Combat Support
- Part of: AF ISR Agency/480th ISR Wing
- Garrison/HQ: Osan AB, Korea
- Decorations: AFOUA

The United States Air Force's 694th Intelligence, Surveillance and Reconnaissance Group (694 ISRG) is an intelligence unit located at Osan AB, Korea.

== Mission ==
The mission of the 694th ISRG is to provide continuous armistice indications and warnings, as well as intelligence, surveillance and reconnaissance operations in support of the Republic of Korea.

== Previous designations ==
- 694th Intelligence, Surveillance and Reconnaissance Group (1 Jan 2009 – present)
- 694th Intelligence Group (1 Oct 1993 – 1 May 2005; 1 Apr 2008 – 1 Jan 2009)
- 694th Intelligence Wing (1 Apr 1992 – 1 Oct 1993)
- 694th Electronic Security Wing (21 Jun 1988 – 1 Apr 1992)

== Assignments ==
=== Major Command/Field Operating Agency ===
- 25th Air Force (29 Sep 2014 – present)
- Air Force Intelligence, Surveillance and Reconnaissance Agency (1 Apr 2008 – 29 Sep 2014)
- Air Intelligence Agency (1 Oct 1993 – 1 May 2005)
- Air Force Intelligence Command (1 Oct 1991 – 1 Oct 1993)
- Electronic Security Command (21 Jun 1988 – 1 Oct 1991)

=== Wings/Groups ===
- 480th Intelligence, Surveillance and Reconnaissance Wing (15 Jul 2008 – present)
- 70th Intelligence Wing (16 Aug 2000 – 1 May 2005; 1 Apr 2008 – 15 Jul 2008)
- 67th Intelligence Wing (1 Oct 1993 – 16 Aug 2000)
- Continental Electronic Security Division, (15 Jul 1988 – 1 Oct 1991)

== Squadrons assigned ==
- 6th Intelligence Squadron – Osan AB, Korea (?-Present)
- 303d Intelligence Squadron – Osan AB, Korea (?-Present)

== Bases stationed ==
- Osan AB, Korea (1 Apr 2008 – present)
- Ft George G. Meade, Maryland (1 Oct 1991 – 1 May 2005)
- Kelly AFB, Texas (15 Jul 1988 – 1 Oct 1991)

== Decorations ==
- Air Force Outstanding Unit Award
  - 1 Jun 2001 – 31 May 2003 (with Combat "Valor" device)
  - 1 Oct 1999 – 30 Sep 2000
  - 1 Oct 1996 – 30 Sep 1998
  - 1 Oct 1994 – 30 Sep 1995
  - 1 Oct 1993 – 30 Sep 1994
