= 515th Air Mobility Operations Wing =

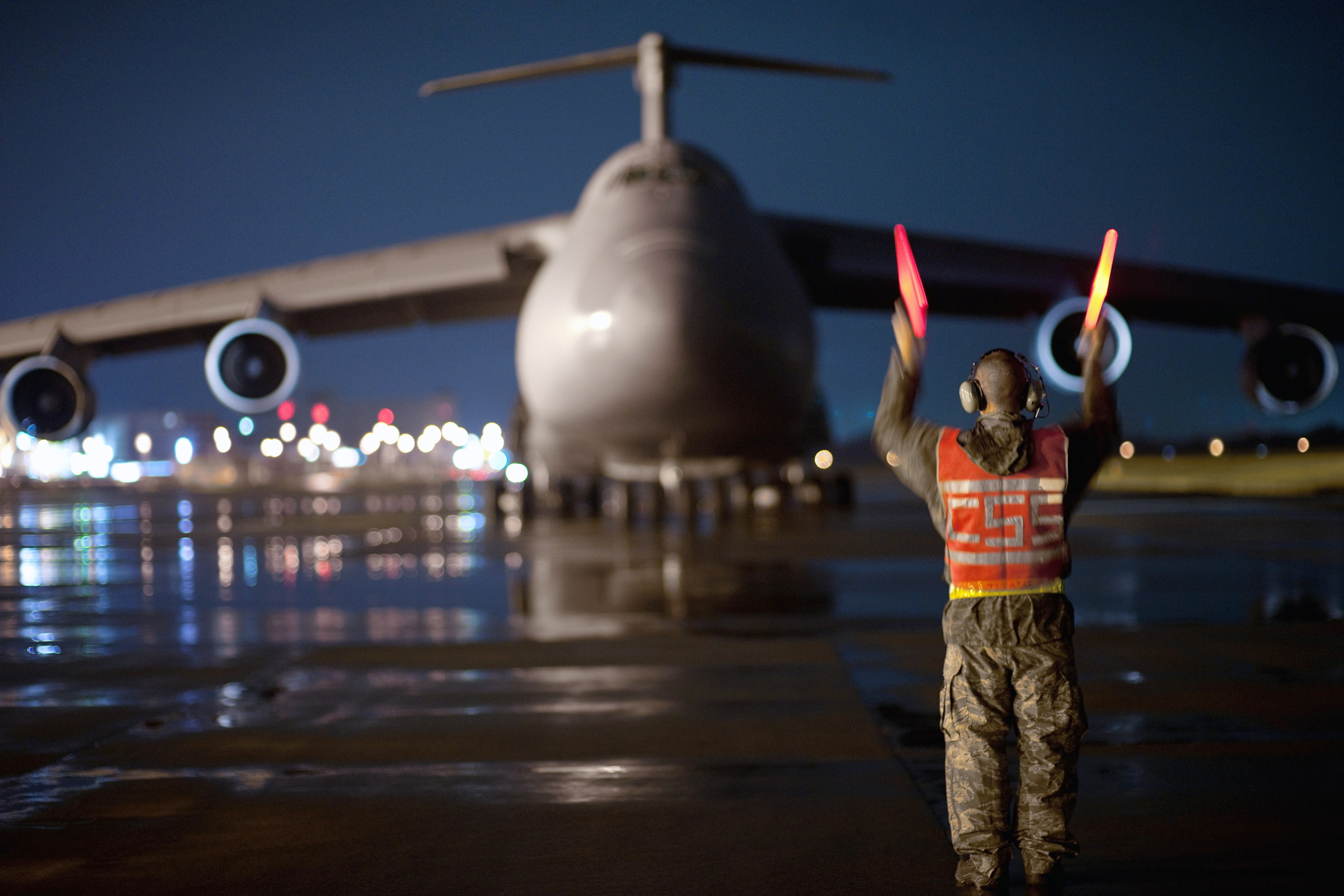
- A member of the wing marshalls a C-5 Galaxy at Yokota Air Base
- Active: 2008 – present
- Country: United States
- Branch: United States Air Force
- Type: Logistics Coordination
- Size: 1,600 personnel
- Part of: Air Mobility Command
- Garrison/HQ: Hickam Air Force Base

Commanders
- Current commander: Colonel Tyler S. Robertson

Insignia
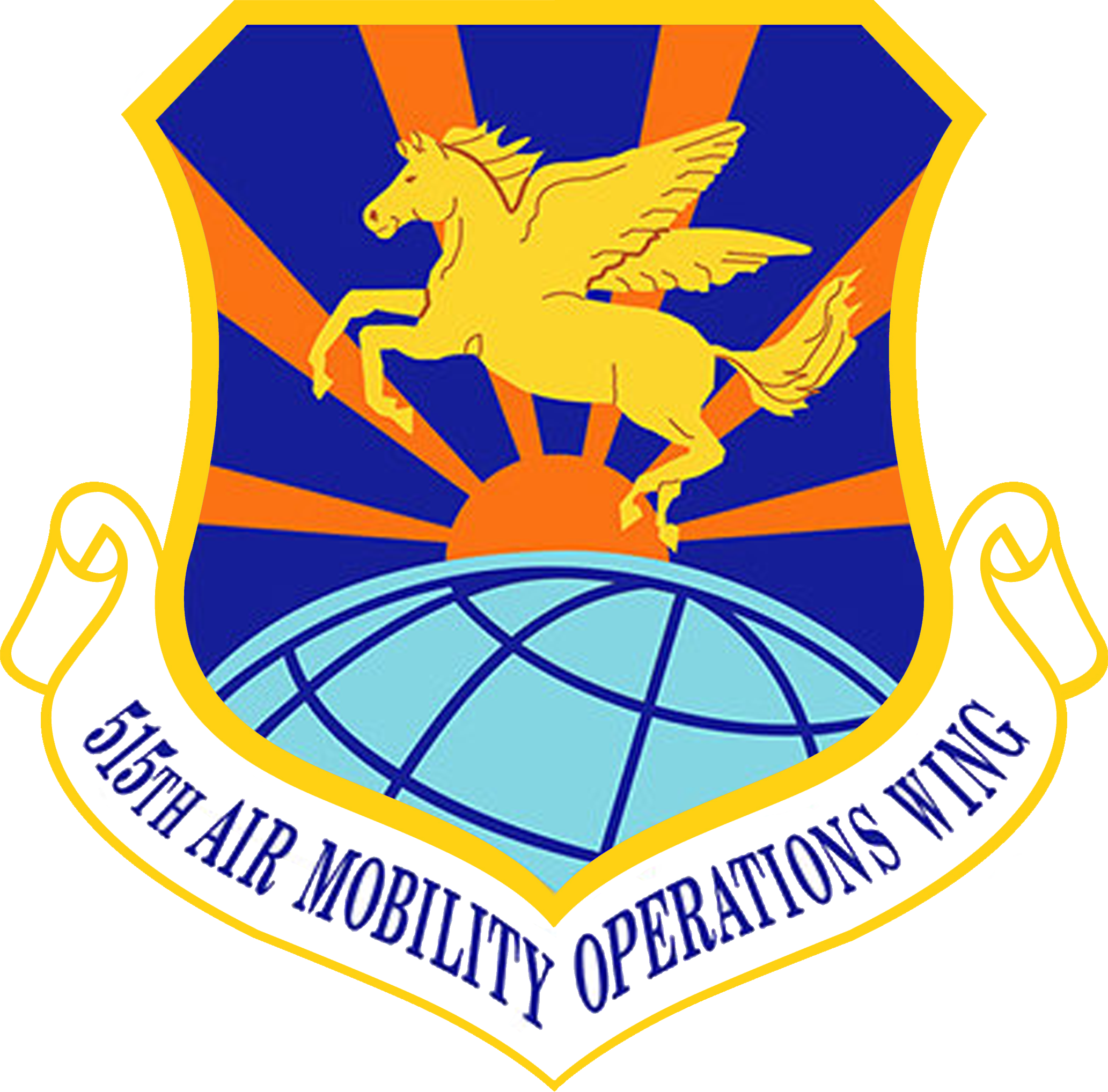
- 515th Air Mobility Operations Wing emblem

The 515th Air Mobility Operations Wing is part of Air Mobility Command stationed at Joint Base Pearl Harbor–Hickam, Hawaii. It was activated in 2008. It coordinates logistical air movements into, out of, and throughout the Pacific. It is part of the United States Air Force Expeditionary Center.

== Mission ==
The 515th serves as the Pacific arm of the United States Air Force Expeditionary Center and Air Mobility Command (AMC). The wing's mission is to provide enroute capability to accelerate air mobility for war fighters throughout the Pacific, utilizing command and control, aerial port operations and aircraft maintenance.

The 515th controls, loads, unloads, and repairs mobility aircraft en route through the Pacific area. This includes military, commercial, and foreign aircraft. Two Air Mobility Operations Groups fall under the wing.

The group has overseen a humanitarian relief to earthquake victims in China and tsunami relief in American Samoa. The wing also plays an essential role supporting the United States global war on terrorism with air mobility support combat commands.

== Units ==
The 515th Air Mobility Operations Wing is composed of two groups:

- 515th Air Mobility Operations Group

Yokota Air Base, Japan

730th Air Mobility Squadron (Yokota Air Base, Japan)
731st Air Mobility Squadron (Osan Air Base, South Korea)
733d Air Mobility Squadron (Kadena Air Base, Japan)

- 715th Air Mobility Operations Group

Elmendorf Air Force Base, Alaska

732nd Air Mobility Squadron (Elmendorf Air Force Base, Alaska)
734th Air Mobility Squadron (Andersen Air Force Base, Guam)
735th Air Mobility Squadron (Joint Base Pearl Harbor–Hickam, Hawaii)

== History ==
The wing was first activated during World War II as the 15th Ferrying Group at Morrison Field, Florida in 1942. The 15th Group ferried aircraft between Florida and points in western Africa. From 1943, the unit then focused on the air transportation mission as the 15th Transport Group. Although the group was stationed at Morrison, its personnel were also used to man other stations of the Caribbean Wing of Air Transport Command (ATC). After a little more than a year of trying to use traditional Table of Organization units like the 15th, ATC found them too inflexible for its operations. It therefore decided to replace its groups and squadrons and assign personnel directly to each of its stations, based on the needs of the station. Accordingly, in October 1943 the group was disbanded as ATC combined its units at Morrison into Station 11, Caribbean Wing, Air Transport Command.

The 515th Air Mobility Operations Wing was activated in June 2008 in a major reorganization of AMC units in the Pacific, which aimed to improve efficiency of the six air mobility squadrons in the Pacific by placing them under the command of a single wing and two regional air mobility operations groups. Previously, the squadrons were managed by a single group.

== Lineage ==
- Constituted as the 15th Ferrying Group on 9 July 1942

Activated c. 21 July 1942

- Redesignated 15th Transport Group on 1 May 1943

Disbanded on 13 October 1943

- Reconstituted and redesignated 515th Tactical Air Support Group on 31 July 1985
- Redesignated 515th Air Mobility Operations Wing on 11 April 2008

Activated on 5 June 2008

=== Assignments ===
- Caribbean Wing, Air Transport Command, c. 21 July 1942 – 13 October 1943
- 15th Expeditionary Mobility Task Force, 5 June 2008
- United States Air Force Expeditionary Center, 19 March 2012 – present

=== Components ===
Groups

- 515th Air Mobility Operations Group, 5 June 2008 – present
- 715th Air Mobility Operations Group, 5 June 2008 – present

Squadrons

- 22d Ferrying Squadron (later 22d Transport Squadron), 21 July 1942 – 13 October 1943
- 23d Ferrying Squadron (later 23d Transport Squadron), 21 July 1942 – 13 October 1943
- 24th Ferrying Squadron (later 24th Transport Squadron), 21 July 1942 – 13 October 1943
- 54th Ferrying Squadron, 15 September 1942 – 1 May 1943

=== Stations ===
- Morrison Field, Florida, 21 July 1942 – 13 October 1943
- Joint Base Pearl Harbor–Hickam, Hawaii, 5 June 2008 – present

=== Campaigns ===
Campaign Streamer	Campaign	Dates	Notes
	American Theater without inscription	21 July 1942 – 13 October 1943	15th Ferrying Group (later 15th Transport Group)

== See also ==
- Air Transport Command
- List of Douglas C-47 Skytrain operators
