= Space-A travel =

Military space available travel

Space-available travel, also known as Space-A travel, is a means by which members of United States uniformed services (United States military, reservists and retirees, United States Department of Defense civilian personnel under certain circumstances), and these groups' family members, are permitted to travel on aircraft of the Air Mobility Command under the jurisdiction of the Department of Defense when excess capability allows.

== Background ==
Space available travel is a privilege that derives, in part, from United States Code, title 10, section 4744, which states, "officers and members of the Military Departments, and their families, when space is available, may be transported on vessels operated by any military transport agency of the Department of Defense". Space available travel is defined as "travel aboard DoD owned or controlled aircraft and occurs when aircraft are not fully booked with passengers traveling under orders".

It is a privilege offered to United States Uniformed Services members. Retired members are given the privilege in recognition of their career and because they are eligible for recall to active duty. The criteria for extending the privilege to other categories of passengers is their support to the mission being performed by uniformed services members and to the enhancement of active duty service members' quality of life.

== Procedures ==
=== Guidelines ===
There are rules and guidelines which apply to such travel. Uniformed personnel may only travel Space-A while on leave or pass for the full duration of their Space-A trip, and Space-A travel cannot be used in conjunction with travel required by the service. Space A travel may not be used for personal financial gain or in connection with business enterprises or employment. Other nations' laws and policies, as well as U.S. foreign policy, may limit the ability to travel using Space-A.

Aside from members of the United States Marine Corps, travelers do not have to be in uniform for their flights.

=== Sign-up process ===
Eligible passengers wanting to travel using DoD Space-A travel are required to sign up at the departing location and are then placed on a locally managed Space-A register. The registration process varies depending on the location, but most locations allow signups via electronic mail, fax, or postal mail.

Each location's passenger service center maintains their own Space-A register. Each person signing up is placed on this register using category of travel, signup date and signup time.

Based on status (active duty military, retired military, emergency traveler, etc.), Space-A travel applicants are assigned a category of travel from 1 to 6, which categorizes their priority of movement, 1 being the highest priority. Thus, an applicant with priority 1 will gain a place on an available aircraft over an applicant with priority 4, for example.

The number of space-available seats may not be known until the flight's "Roll Call" just prior to the flight departs. After sorting the signup register by category of travel and signup date, the passenger terminal personnel follow a selection procedure. If there is sufficient seating for everyone desiring a seat, then everyone boards; otherwise, a cutoff point is determined.

=== Eligibility ===
The branches of service eligible for Space-A travel are:

- United States Navy
- United States Marine Corps
- United States Army
- United States Air Force
- United States Coast Guard
- United States Space Force
- United States Public Health Service
- National Oceanic and Atmospheric Administration

=== Space-required versus space-available ===
Space-A travel is not without its pitfalls. Unlike traditional commercial air traffic, military flights are not always assigned predictable takeoff times. Many factors go into planning a military flight, with space-required cargo and passengers forming the basis of planning. Severe weather may also cause delays, just like commercial flights do. There is no consideration given to potential Space-A travelers during the planning process.

=== Veterans Space-A travel eligibility ===
Uniformed Services Retirees (receiving retirement pay and possessing a Designated Retiree ID Card) and their accompanying dependents can travel Space-A anywhere that Space-A is allowed.

"Gray Area" Retirees have limited eligibility (but not their dependents). DoD reg, Section 4, Table 3, a Gray Area Retiree (Reservist who is "eligible" for retirement pay at 60 years of age but not fully retired with a Retired ID Card), can fly Space-A only within the CONUS and directly between the CONUS and Alaska, Hawaii, Puerto Rico, the US Virgin Islands, Guam, and American Samoa (Guam and American Samoa travelers may transit Hawaii or Alaska); or traveling within Alaska, Hawaii, Puerto Rico or the Virgin Islands.

As of August 13th 2018, authorized veterans with a permanent service-connected disability rated 100% as total are eligible for Space-A travel traveling in the CONUS or directly between the Continental United States CONUS and Alaska, Hawaii, Puerto Rico, the U.S. Virgin Islands, Guam, and American Samoa (Guam and American Samoa travelers may transit Hawaii or Alaska); or traveling within Alaska, Hawaii, Puerto Rico or the U.S. Virgin Islands. Dependents of retirees, Reservists, “Gray Area” retirees, 100% disabled veterans, and surviving spouses are eligible to fly Space-A, but only when accompanied by their sponsor.

The following dependents and family members are NOT eligible to fly Space-A at all:

- Ex-spouses of service members or retirees.
- A service member’s or retiree’s parents, siblings, or any other family members who are not the sponsor’s dependents.

== Aircraft generally allowing for Space-A travel ==
C-5 Galaxy	
C-12 Huron	based on the Beechcraft Super King Air business aircraft
C-17 Globemaster III	
C-20 Gulfstream III	based on the Gulfstream III and Gulfstream IV business jets
C-21 Learjet	based on the Learjet 35A business jet
C-22B	based on the Boeing 727 passenger jet
VC-25A	based on the Boeing 747-200 passenger jet
C-32	based on the Boeing 757 passenger jet; used as Air Force Two
UC-35 Citation V	based on the Cessna Citation V business jet
C-37 Gulfstream V	based on the Gulfstream V business jet
C-38 Courier	based on the IAI Astra business jet
C-40 Clipper	based on the Boeing 737 passenger jet
C-130 Hercules	
C-135 Stratolifter	derived from Boeing 367-80 prototype jet (the basis for the Boeing 707 passenger jet)
KC-10 Extender	based on the civilian DC-10-30 airliner
KC-135 Stratotanker	

The majority of flights that passengers take occur on: C-5, C-17, C-40, C-130, KC-10, and KC-135 aircraft.

== Non-governmental support for Space-A travel ==
Space-A travelers might meet abrupt, sometimes even in-flight, changes in travel. This need for pre-planning has given rise to a small industry surrounding such travel. Non-governmental enterprises (for the most part, publishers) produce products, initially through books and maps, with more recent incarnations as websites which provide travelers with information regarding Space-A travel.
