= 730th Air Mobility Squadron =

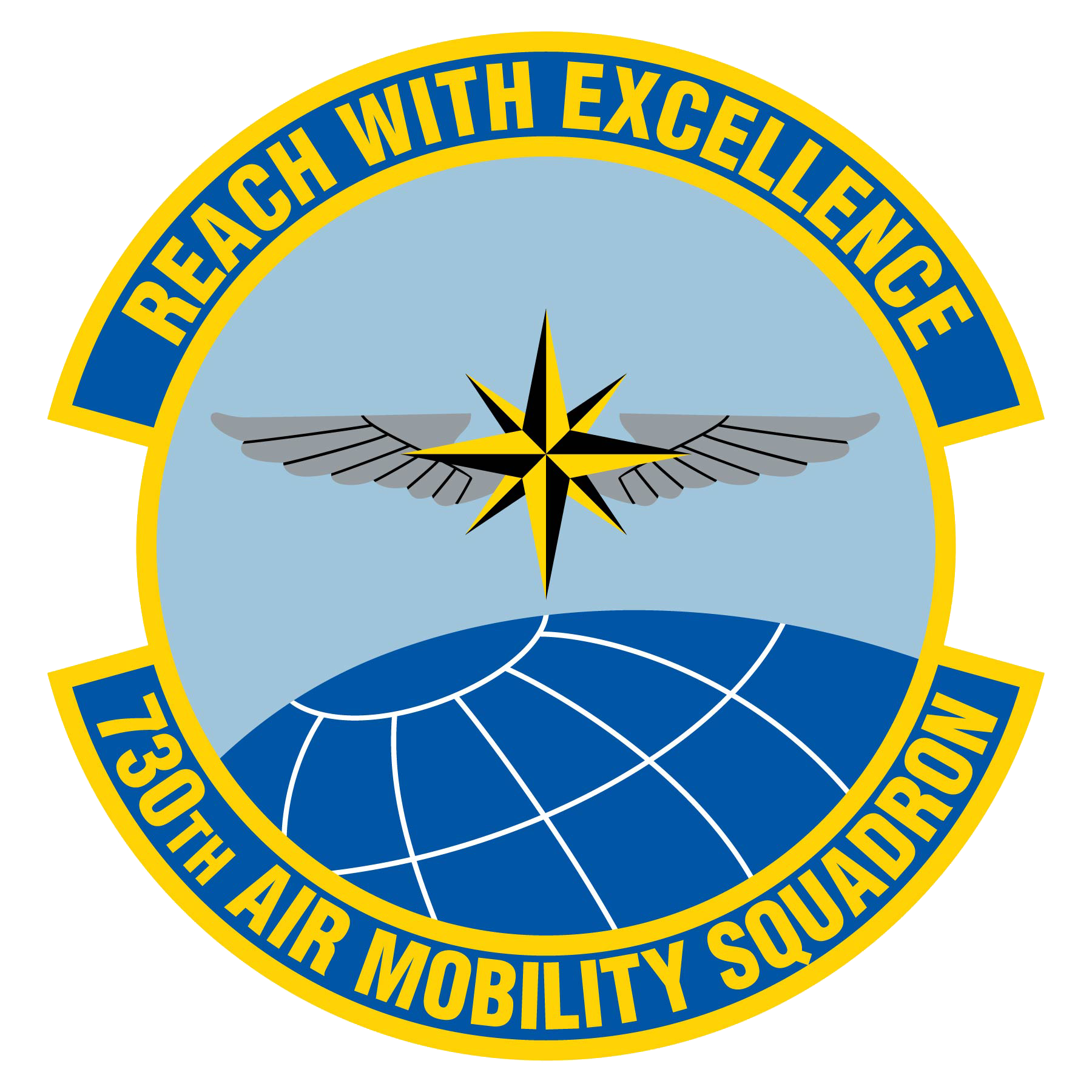
- Official Unit Emblem
- Active: 2001-present
- Country: United States
- Branch: United States Air Force
- Part of: 515th Air Mobility Operations Group: 515th Air Mobility Operations Wing
- Garrison/HQ: Yokota Air Base, Japan
- Decorations: Air Force Outstanding Unit Award

Commanders
- Current commander: Major Weniger

The 730th Air Mobility Squadron (730 AMS) is a unit of the 515th Air Mobility Operations Group, based at Yokota AB, Japan and the 515th Air Mobility Operations Wing, based at Hickam AFB, Hawaii.

== History ==
Prior to being activated as the 730 AMS, the squadron was designated as the 630th Air Mobility Support Squadron [AMSS]. The change in designation became effective on 15 March 2001, when the 630th AMSS was inactivated and the 730th AMS activated at Yokota AB. The change was enacted to better reflect the role of the unit as more operational than support oriented.

For the six years previous to the unit's inactivation, the 630th AMSS provided fixed, deployed command and control, aerial port, and maintenance required for the United States' Global Reach in the western Pacific.

The squadron is part of AMC's en route system to provide fixed and deployed maintenance, aerial port and command and control support to deployed AMC forces. The squadron's mission is to provide critical en route services to deployed forces worldwide.

The 630th Air Mobility Support Squadron was one of Air Mobility Command's primary Pacific hubs for air traffic. It was AMC's senior activity at Yokota and it represented other AMC organizations in the Pacific including operating locations at Fukuoka Airport and Misawa Air Base, Japan. The 630th supported all strategic/commercial airlift throughout the Pacific. The air transportation function operated the primary U.S. aerial port in Japan, providing support to U. S. military passengers and cargo arriving or departing from Yokota.
