= Pass (military) =

A pass is permission to be away from one's military unit for a limited period of time. Time away on a pass is not counted against leave, the annual allotment of days off from duty.

== Types of passes ==
- Normal off-duty hours — granted to personnel to allow them to go off their military installation whenever they are not required to be on duty, subject to recall at any time as needed, and revocable at the unit's discretion.
- Regular pass — granted to allow personnel to be away for a designated period of time only. May be granted to those, such as trainees, not eligible for a normal off-duty hours pass.
- Three-day pass — the longest continuous pass granted allows a serviceman or servicewoman to be away for 72 consecutive hours. Often granted in recognition of special achievement or as a reward, especially as a way of granting a three-day weekend.

== By country variations ==
In the RAF, a "Permanent Pass" known as Form 557 would be issued to servicemen of good standing and six-months service allowing them to leave the quarters after duty until midnight and no further than eight miles (or as otherwise restricted on the form). It could be endorsed with permission to wear plain clothes.

== See also ==
- Leave (U.S. military)
