= Leave (U.S. military) =

Permission to be away from one's unit for a specific period of time

In the United States's military, leave is permission to be away from one's unit for a specific period of time. This includes all six service branches of the military and the National Oceanic and Atmospheric Administration (NOAA).

== Entitlement ==
Under normal circumstances, all personnel are granted 30 days of leave per year. This time is usually used for vacations and other extended time periods away from the service that are longer than three days or need to be taken in the middle of the week. Leave is accumulated at the rate of 2.5 days per month. A member's leave is annotated in the monthly Leave and Earnings Statement.

Under 5 U.S.C. § 6323(a)(1), civilian federal employees who are reservists are allowed “15 days” of annual paid leave for reserve or National Guard training. Prior to 2000, the Justice Department, as had other federal agencies, included days employees were not scheduled to work but would be at reserve training when calculating how much leave an employee used. This miscalculation resulted in the federal appeal of Butterbaugh v. Department of Justice, 336 F.3d 1332 (Fed. Cir. 2003). The Butterbaugh Decision changed things for these reservists and would result in many more federal employees finding their reservist time wrongly charged.

== Leave and passes ==
Leave and passes are terms to describe days off work. A typical weekend day off is also known as a regular pass. Up to four consecutive days off can be either leave days or pass days. Leave days are deducted from the Service Member's 30 annual days off. Pass days are not deducted. Five or more days off must be deducted as leave. Leave and pass days can now be taken consecutively, as long as the Service Member is in the local area to sign back in from or on leave; for example, a Service Member may put in for a 4-day pass over the 4th of July weekend, and utilize leave starting the day after the 4-day weekend, as long as the service member personally signs in or out on leave.

If leave is taken through a weekend, Saturday and Sunday are also deducted as leave days. For example, a Service Member who takes leave from Thursday to the following Tuesday will be deducted six days of leave for Thursday, Friday, Saturday, Sunday, Monday, and Tuesday.

Passes can also be awarded to Service Members for particular achievements. Although passes may be taken for up to 4 days, 3 day passes are granted on most occasions. When 3 day passes are awarded, they are most commonly taken over a weekend giving the Service Member one duty day off. One or 2 day passes can also be granted for exceptional circumstances during the duty week; for example, a Service Member can be given a pass for a Wednesday in order to accompany their several children for school physicals, or a Wednesday-Thursday if the Service Member is having to travel overnight for an appointment or event.

== Absent without leave ==
Absent without leave (AWOL) is considered employee misconduct and an attendance issue. This means a Service Member is absent from his/her assigned duty and the absences was not authorized and/or was denied.

== Types of leave ==
The four most common types of leave are:

- Ordinary leave which is regular chargeable leave time.
- Emergency leave which is processed more quickly due to an emergency situation but still treated as chargeable leave.
- Convalescent leave which is non-chargeable and only allowed with a doctor's signature that states the servicemember cannot return to duty for an extended period of time.
- Excess Leave (see AR 600-8-10)
- Permissive TDY (Temporary Duty), which is non-chargeable and is only used while traveling between stations while using their leave for government related purposes. Servicemembers using PTDY (Permissive TDY) are not charged while on leave but are also not granted travel pay. Permissive TDY is typically used when PCSing (Permanent Change of Station) and can be granted to a service member when looking for a place to live. Typically for only 10 days.

== Rollover ==
Leave time will "rollover" from year to year. A servicemember may carry up to 60 days of leave before he or she must take it. Leave in excess of 60 days is known as "Use or Lose": if the servicemember does not use the excess leave by October 1 (the beginning of the new fiscal and training year), he or she will lose it (this was extended from 60 days to 75 from June 27, 2008 until 30 September 2015). Under certain circumstances, the use or lose threshold may be extended to 80 days, if the member is unable to take leave due to duty requirements, usually because of a deployment. If a servicemember leaves the military without having used all his or her leave time, the unused days are paid for at the member's regular rate of pay upon separation. Conversely, though the situation is less common, pay will be deducted as excess leave on separation if too many days were taken.

== Block leave ==
Block leave refers to time when most or all of the unit takes leave at the same time (as a "block"). Commonly, block leave time is allowed during the summer and Christmas holidays, and before and after deployments.

== Terminal leave ==
Prior to separation or retirement from the military, a member may take the remainder of the leave accumulated. For instance, if a member's separation/retirement date is June 30, and the member has 30 days of leave accrued, the member may go on "terminal leave" beginning June 1. All outprocessing from the service would need to be accomplished prior to June 1. Once entering "terminal leave", he/she would have no further military duties, but would still collect a paycheck and other entitlements such as basic allowance for housing, basic allowance for subsistence, and medical coverage, through the official separation/retirement date of June 30.
