= 6th Intelligence Squadron =

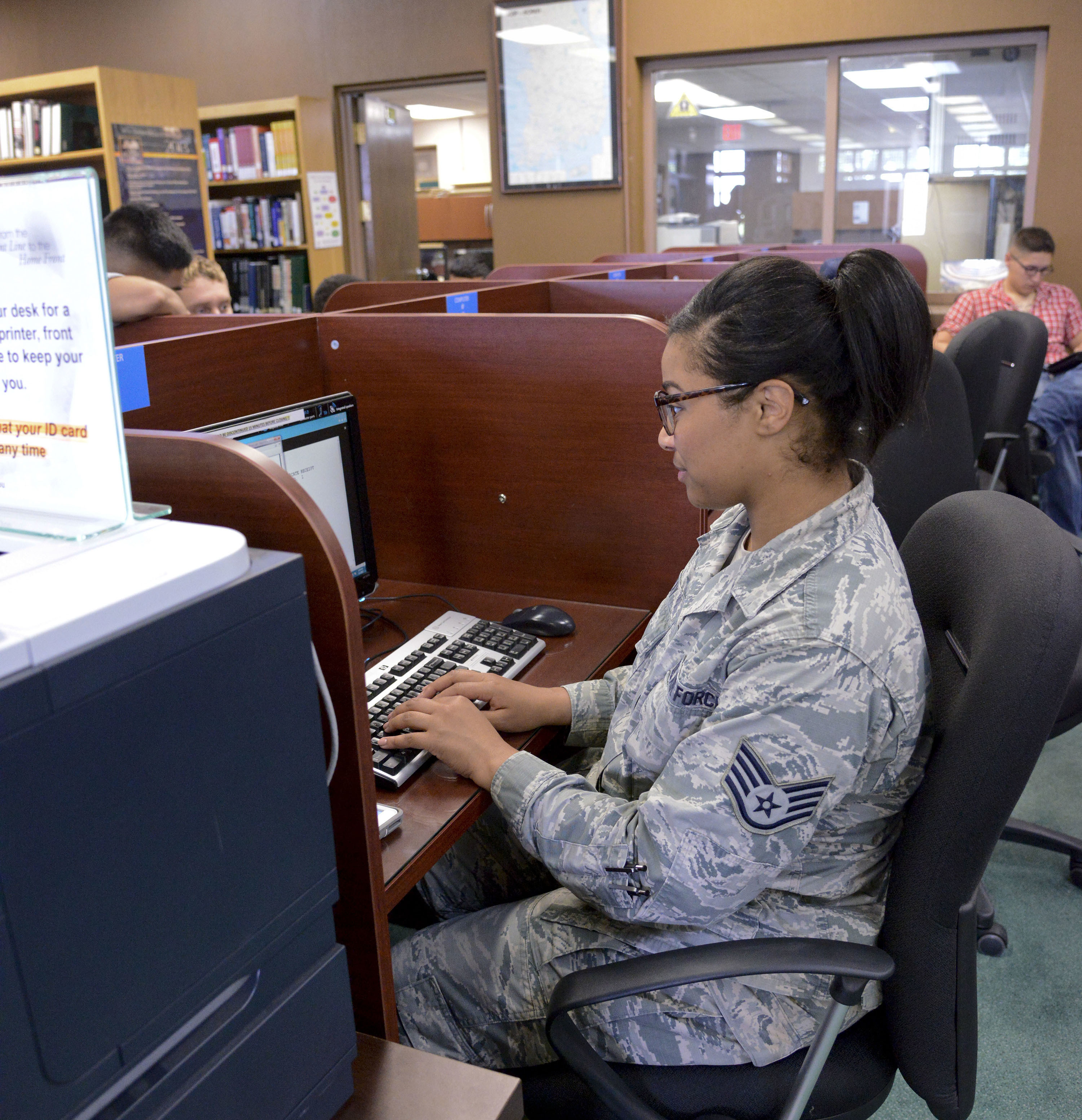
- A member of the 6th Intelligence Squadron at the Osan AB learning center
- Active: 1942–1945; 2008–present
- Country: United States
- Branch: United States Air Force
- Role: Intelligence
- Part of: 694th Intelligence, Surveillance and Reconnaissance Group
- Garrison/HQ: Osan Air Base, Korea
- Motto(s): The Tiger Never Sleeps
- Engagements: China-Burma-India Theater
- Decorations: Air Force Outstanding Unit Award

Insignia
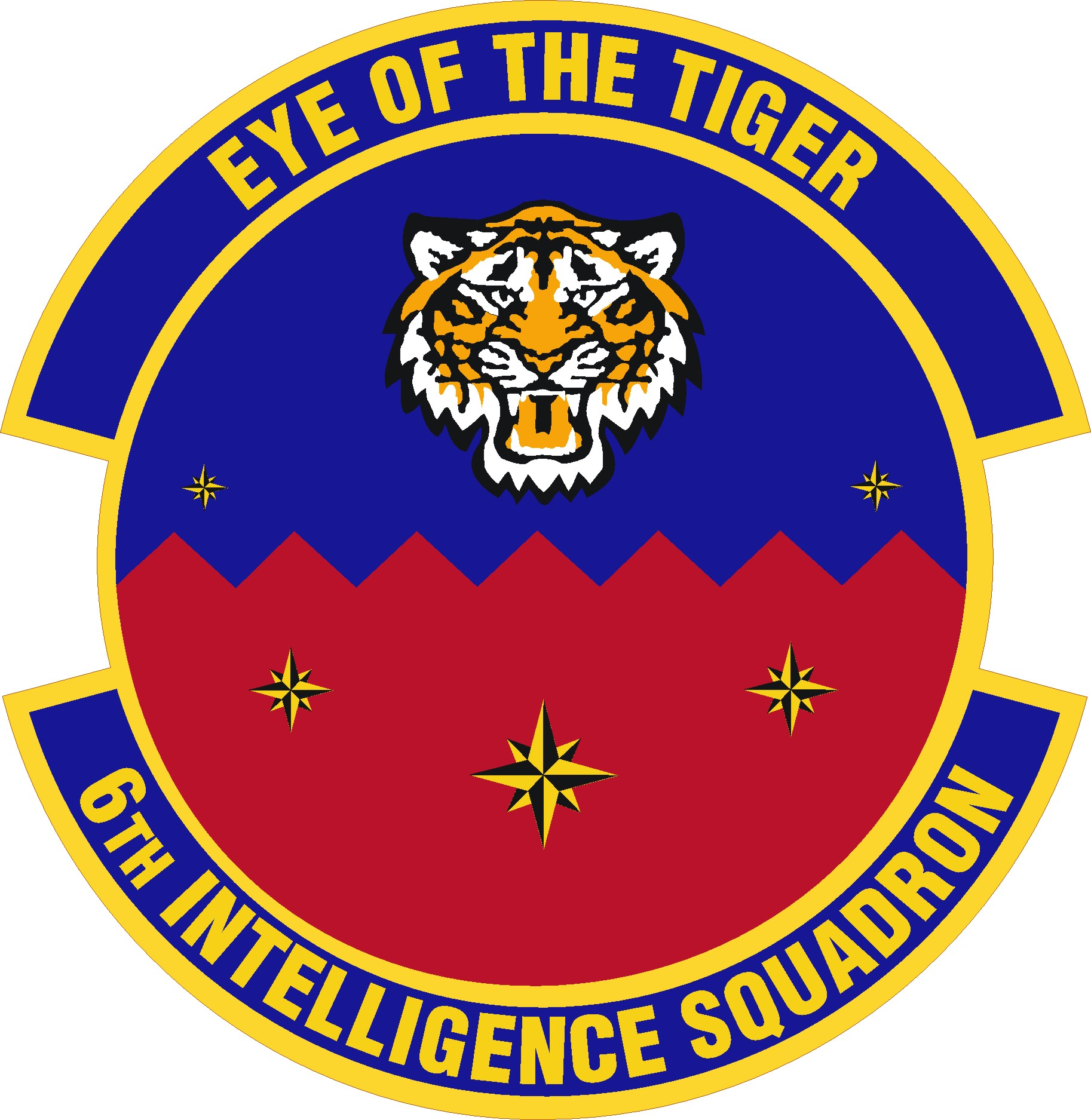
- 6th Intelligence Sq emblem (approved 1 June 2012)

The United States Air Force's 6th Intelligence Squadron is an intelligence unit located at Osan Air Base, Korea. During World War II, as the 6th Radio Squadron, Mobile, it gathered intelligence for 10th Air Force from listening posts in India.

== Mission ==
The mission of the 6th Intelligence Squadron is to execute 24/7 imagery and analytical operations, as part of the Distributed Ground System-Three (DGS-3), to support Seventh Air Force during armistice and war.

== History ==
=== World War II ===
The squadron was first established in the Signal Corps at Hamilton Field shortly after the attack on Pearl Harbor as the 140th Signal Radio Intelligence Company. The unit trained in California and was converted to an Air Corps unit in the summer of 1944 as the 6th Radio Squadron, Mobile, specializing in intercepting radio transmissions in Japanese.

In September 1944, the squadron shipped to India, arriving the following month. Until V-J Day, it conducted operations from Barrackpore, India, remaining in theater through November 1945, when it returned to the United States and was inactivated. It remained inactive until it was disbanded in 1983.

=== Korea ===
The squadron was reconstituted as the 6th Intelligence Squadron and reactivated in 2009 at Osan Air Base, Korea.

== Lineage ==
- Constituted as the 140th Signal Radio Intelligence Company, Aviation on 7 February 1942

Activated on 14 February 1942
Redesignated 6th Radio Squadron, Mobile (J) (Note: The (J) meant that its operators were qualified in Japanese.) on 31 Mar 1944
inactivated on 7 December 1945

- Redesignated 6th Radio Squadron, Mobile on 14 November 1946 (not active)
- Disbanded on 15 June 1983
- Reconstituted and redesignated 6th Intelligence Squadron on 9 December 2008

Activated on 1 January 2009

=== Assignments ===
- Fourth Air Force, 14 February 1942 – 26 September 1944
- Tenth Air Force, 28 October 1944 – 7 December 1945
- 694th Intelligence, Surveillance and Reconnaissance Group, 1 January 2009 – present

=== Stations ===
- Hamilton Field, California, 14 February 1942
- Army Air Base, Bakersfield, California, 28 April 1942
- Hammer Field, California, 13 August 1942
- Dale City, California, 10 February 1943
- Camp Pinedale, California, 11 July 1944
- Camp Anza, California, 16–26 September 1944
- Bombay, India, 28 October 1944
- Kanchrapara, India, 1 November 1944
- Barrackpore, India, 26 November 1944
- Calcutta, India, 5–8 November 1945
- Camp Kilmer, New Jersey, 6–7 December 1945
- Osan Air Base, Korea, 1 January 2009 – present
