= Yokota Air Base =

Japan-US air force base in Fussa, Tokyo, Japan

- 横田飛行場; Yokota Hikōjō
- Fussa, Tokyo in Japan
- US Air Force C-130J Super Hercules of the 36th Airlift Squadron parked on the Yokota flight-line during 2013. The aircraft feature the 'YJ' Yokota tail code.

Site information
- Type: US Air Force Base
- Owner: Various (leased by Government of Japan and made available to the US)
- Operator: United States Air Force
- Controlled by: Pacific Air Forces (PACAF)
- Condition: Operational
- Website: www.yokota.af.mil

Location
- Location within Tokyo Location within Japan
- Coordinates: 35°44′55″N 139°20′55″E

Site history
- Built: 1940 (as Tama Airfield)
- In use: 1940 – present

Garrison information
- Current commander: Col. Richard F. McElhaney
- Garrison: 374th Airlift Wing (Host)

Airfield information
- Identifiers: IATA: OKO, ICAO: RJTY, WMO: 476420
- Elevation: 140.8 metres (462 ft) AMSL
Runways
Direction	Length and surface
18/36	3,353 metres (11,001 ft) Concrete
- Source: Japanese AIP at AIS Japan

Yokota Air Base (横田飛行場, Yokota Hikōjō) (IATA: OKO, ICAO: RJTY) is a Japan Air Self-Defense Force (JASDF) and United States Air Force (USAF) base in the Tama Area, or Western Tokyo.

It occupies portions of Akishima, Fussa, Hamura, Mizuho, Musashimurayama, and Tachikawa.

The base houses about 14,000 personnel. It occupies a total area of 7.07 km^{2} (2.73 sq mi) and has a 3,353 m × 61 m (11,001 ft × 200 ft) runway.

It features the JASDF Air Defense Command Headquarters (ADC headquarters) since 26 March 2012. The headquarters of United States Forces Japan is also located there. Other base facilities are the broadcast center for the American Forces Network Tokyo radio service and a detachment of Pacific Air Forces' Band of the Pacific.

== History ==
=== Tama Airfield ===
The facility that houses Yokota Air Base was built during World War II by the Imperial Japanese Army (IJA) in 1940. It became the center of Japanese Army Air Forces flight test activities. The base was also the site of the first meeting between Japanese officials and their Italian wartime allies.

Tama was first spotted by the United States Army Air Forces in November 1944 by a 3rd Reconnaissance Squadron F-13 Superfortress photo-reconnaissance aircraft, flying from Tinian in the Mariana Islands. USAAF intelligence connected it with the aircraft manufacturing plant of Nakajima Aircraft Company in the nearby town of Musashino. Along with Tachikawa Air Base to the east and the factory of Showa Aircraft Industry to the south, it was compared to the USAAF's own aircraft-development complex at Wright-Patterson Field in Ohio. The two bases conducted all IJA flight testing. In spring 1945, XXI Bomber Command launched eight missions against the base and the aircraft manufacturing plant, but each time heavy clouds forced the bombers to attack secondary targets. The Nakajima plant was finally attacked in April 1945, but the Tama airfield never was bombed.

=== Postwar years ===
Two days after the surrender of Japan on 2 September 1945, a detachment of the United States Army 1st Cavalry Division arrived at the base. The airfield's buildings were largely intact, and some 280 of the IJA's most modern aircraft were discovered in hangars.

The 1st Cavalry named the facility Fussa Army Airfield, then at the end of September renamed it Yokota Army Airfield after a nearby village (now incorporated in Musashimurayama) that appeared on a 1944 US map.

The name was to have been changed to Wilkins Army Air Base (WAAB) after Medal of Honor recipient Raymond "Ray" Wilkins, but orders for this never arrived. Still, some metal manhole covers stamped "WAAB" remained in use around the base in 2017.

The USAAF initially used the base for airlift operations. The 2d Combat Cargo Group arrived with four C-47 Skytrain squadrons. The runway deteriorated under heavy use and was repaired. Yokota supported operations of the A-26 Invader-equipped 3d Bombardment Group by August 1946.

When the USAAF became the USAF in 1947, it was renamed Yokota Air Base. More construction during the 1940s and 1950s brought the base to its current size around 1960.

On the occasion of extension, the course of Hachiko Line and National Route 16 was changed, and Itsukaichi Kaidō was divided.

During the postwar occupation years, Yokota hosted these USAAF/USAF units:

- 20th Combat Mapping Group (October 1945 – April 1946) (F-7 Liberator)
- 8th Reconnaissance Group (June 1946 – October 1947) (F-7)
- 71st Reconnaissance Group (February 1947 – April 1949) (RB-17, RB-29, RF-51, RF-61 and RF-80)

These units performed photographic reconnaissance and mapping of Japan and South Korea.

- 6th Night Fighter Squadron (1946–47) (P-61A/B)
  Inactivated and personnel, mission and equipment transferred to 339th Fighter Squadron (347th Fighter Group) with F-82F/G Twin Mustangs at Nagoya Air Base.
- 82nd Photo Reconnaissance Squadron (1947–48) (FP-80)
- 3d Emergency Rescue Squadron (July 1947 – April 1950) (SB-17G)
  Flew modified B-17G bombers equipped to carry a 27-foot A-1 lifeboat under their bellies; the boat could be dropped by parachute with enough food, water, and clothing to enable 12 survivors to last for about 20 days in the ocean.

==== Korean War ====
During the Korean War, Yokota was used for combat missions over North and South Korea. Known units based there were:

- Fighter units
  - 27th Fighter-Escort Wing (November – December 1950)
    Flew F-84E Thunderjets on armed reconnaissance, interdiction, fighter escort, and close air support missions.
  - 35th Fighter-Interceptor Wing (April - August 1950)
    Flew F-80Cs on air defense missions.
    - 339th Fighter Squadron (April – August 1950)
      Attached to 35th Fighter-Interceptor Wing and flew F-82F/G Twin Mustang missions over South Korea during the first few months of hostilities.
- Bombardment units
  - 92d Bombardment Group (325th, 326th and 327th Bombardment Squadrons) (July – October 1950)
    Deployed squadrons from Spokane Army Airfield, Washington. Flew B-29 Bombing missions over North Korea.
  - 98th Bombardment Wing (343d, 344th and 345th Bomb Squadrons) (August 1950 – July 1954)
    Group, then Wing deployed from Spokane Army Airfield. Flew B-29 Bombing missions over North Korea. Two days after arriving at Yokota, the squadrons conducted a bomb mission against marshalling yards at Pyongyang, North Korea. The 98th BG engaged primarily in interdiction of enemy communications centers but also supported UN ground forces. Interdiction targets included marshalling yards, oil centers, rail facilities, bridges, roads, troop concentrations, airfields, and military installations.
- Reconnaissance units
  - 31st Strategic Reconnaissance Squadron Photographic (July–August 1950)
    Flew combat missions to provide FEAF (Far East Air Forces) Bomber Command with target and bomb-damage assessment photography.
  - 91st Strategic Reconnaissance Squadron, Medium, Photographic (December 1950 – December 1954)
    Assigned to 407th Strategic Fighter Wing (1953–54)
    Absorbed the personnel and resources of the 31st Strategic Reconnaissance Squadron in Japan. Using RB-29, RB-45, RB-50 and RB-36 aircraft, it performed target and bomb-damage assessment photo and visual reconnaissance for FEAF Bomber Command, flew other special photographic missions, and conducted electronic "ferret" reconnaissance to determine frequency, location, and other characteristics of enemy ground radar. The squadron also performed shipping surveillance over the Sea of Japan near the Siberian coast and leaflet drops over North Korea. Beginning in late 1952, rotating aircrews of the Philippine-based 581st Air Resupply and Communications Wing augmented the 91st SRS in flying leaflet missions.
  - 512th Bombardment Squadron (January – August 1950)
    Operated the B/RB/WB-29 aircraft and flew weather reconnaissance missions.
  - 56th Weather Reconnaissance Squadron (September 1951 – July 1972)
    Replaced the 512th Bomb Squadron in their weather reconnaissance mission. They operated WB-29, WB-50, WC-135B and RB-57 aircraft used to sample airborne nuclear debris as well as weather patterns in the Pacific.

=== Cold War ===
With the Korean War reaching an armistice in July 1953, Yokota Air Base returned to a peacetime Cold War status. Two major wings were stationed at the base during the 1950s, the 67th Reconnaissance Wing (1956–60) flying RF-80s, RF-84s and lastly RF-101s. The 35th Fighter-Interceptor Wing (1954–57) flew F-86 Sabres from the base. A Tactical Air Command (TAC) air refueling unit, the 421st Air Refueling Squadron flew KB-29s, and later KB-50Js from Yokota from 1953 to 1965. All of these units were under the command of the 41st Air Division.

The 35th TFW was reassigned in 1957 and the 67th TRW in 1960. Defense budget restrictions in the late 1950s caused several PACAF wings based in Japan to be reassigned or inactivated. These tactical fighter units were replaced by the B-57 equipped 3rd Bombardment Wing where it trained in bombardment, reconnaissance and aerial refueling operations. The Air Defense Command 40th Fighter-Interceptor Squadron (December 1961 – May 1962) equipped with the F-102 Delta Dagger performing an air defense mission.

The 6102d Air Base Wing assumed host unit status for the base, being replaced by the 441st Combat Support Group in 1964.

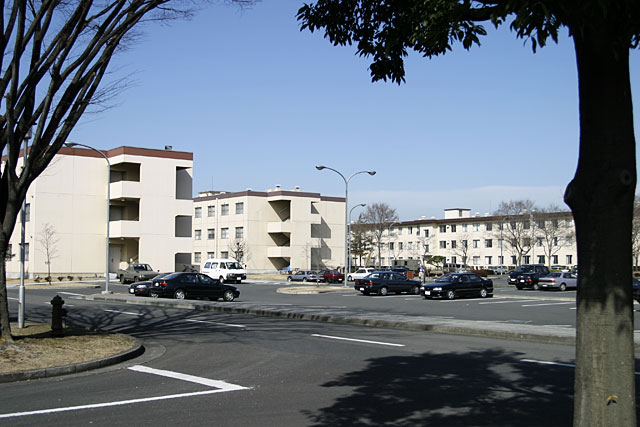
Housing for unaccompanied personnel

The Vietnam War resulted in an increased combat and airlift aircraft presence at the base. Yokota was used for ferrying B-52 Stratofortresses to Southeast Asia along with being a base for US-based deployed F-105 Thunderchief 35th, 36th and 80th Tactical Fighter Squadrons. The 610th Military Airlift Support Squadron (1966–78) was created by Military Airlift Command (MAC) to service the large increase in transiting airlift. The 65th Military Airlift Support Group (1969–71) was a headquarters organization for MAC airlift support squadrons in the Pacific and Far East.

The F-105 squadrons deployed frequently to USAF-operated bases in Thailand to fly combat missions over North and South Vietnam, and to South Korea for alert missions. Initially the fighter squadrons were under the command of the 41st Air Division, but was reassigned shortly after to the 6441st Tactical Fighter Wing, activated in April 1965 to control the F-105 squadrons after their parent organization, the 8th Tactical Fighter Wing, relocated to George Air Force Base, California to become an F-4 Phantom II unit. With the reassignment of the 347th Fighter Wing to Yokota in 1968, the 347th assumed responsibility for all tactical fighters until its reassignment to Kunsan Air Base, South Korea in March 1971.

In 1971, all combat squadrons were transferred to Kadena and Misawa Air Base and Yokota became a Host station as the 475th Air Base Wing. The 475th had no numbered flying squadrons, but operated a three T-39A Saberliners and two UH-1N helicopters (operating as The Orient Express), along with supporting transient MAC cargo and passenger aircraft. Assigned flying squadrons returned to Yokota in 1975 when the 345th Tactical Airlift Squadron was assigned with its C-130Es.

Headquarters, Fifth Air Force was transferred to Yokota on 11 November 1974 from Fuchū Air Base, Japan.

=== Post-Cold War ===
In 2005, the Japanese government announced that the headquarters of the Japan Air Self-Defense Force Air Defense Command would be moved to Yokota.

The Tokyo Metropolitan Government has advocated opening Yokota to civilian flights as a method of relieving traffic at Haneda and Narita Airport. Governor Shintaro Ishihara raised the joint-use proposal during the 2003 gubernatorial election, and Governor Naoki Inose made comments in 2013 that suggested joint use as a possible solution to cope with visitor demand during the 2020 Summer Olympics in Tokyo. A broad agreement on civil-military use of the base was agreed on in 2005.

In November 2009, the base was attacked by Kakurōkyō members using improvised mortar barrages.

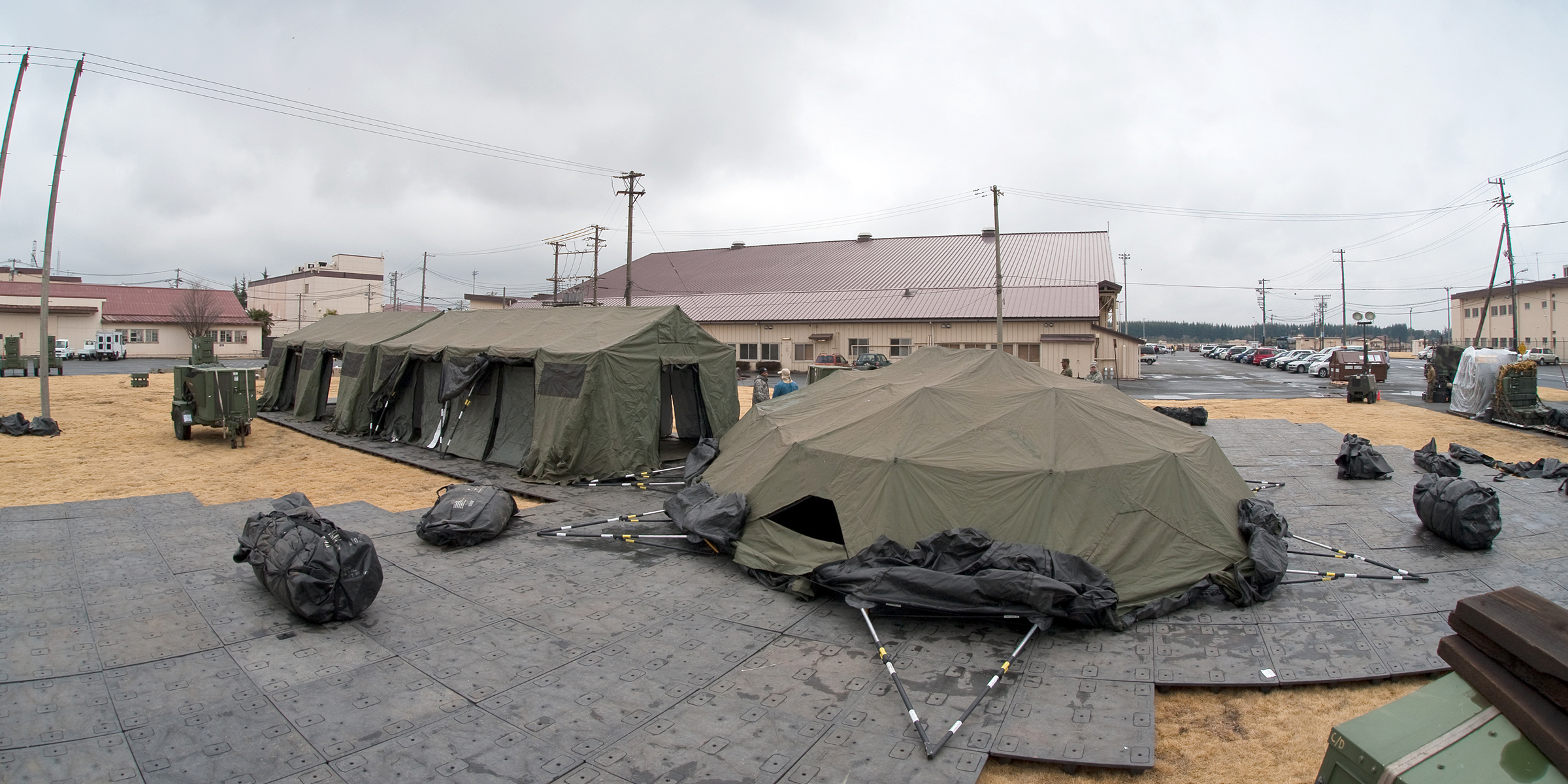
Tents used to house U.S. Pacific Command's (USPACOM) Deployable Joint Command and Control (DJC2) system during Operation Tomodachi

In April 2010 Colonel Frank Eppich, the USAF commander of base, banned screenings of the film The Cove at the base theater. A base spokesman said that The Cove was banned because using a base venue to display the film could be seen as an endorsement of the film. The spokesman added, "We have a lot of issues with Japan... and anything done on an American base would be seen as an approval of that event."

Personnel and aircraft from the base assisted with Operation Tomodachi following and during the March 2011 Tōhoku earthquake and tsunami and Fukushima I nuclear accidents. The base also served as an important hub for airlifted assistance during the disaster recovery efforts. During the crisis, around 600 American family members voluntarily departed the base for locations outside Japan.

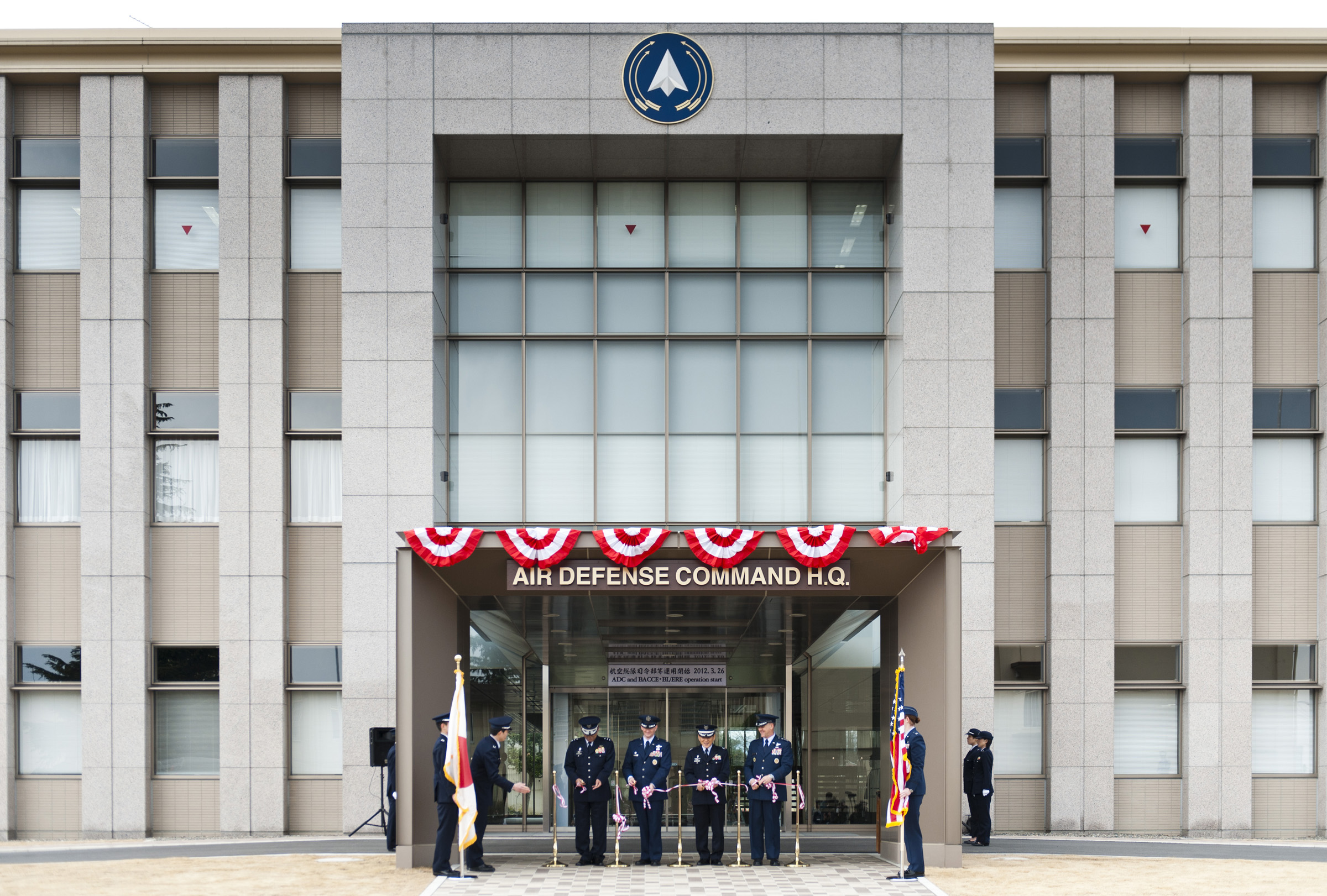
JASDF Air Defense Command Headquarters

On 21 March 2012 JASDF units completed moving from Fuchū Air Base (Tokyo). On 26 March, JASDF Yokota Air Base started operations.

In 2013, the air base was again attacked by Kakurokyo members by improvised mortar barrages.

On 5 April 2018 five CV-22 Osprey tiltrotor aircraft deployed to the base. They had originally been scheduled to deploy to Yokota in 2020, but the deployment was brought forward. As the first permanent deployment of the aircraft outside of Okinawa, the move sparked local protests. The number of aircraft will eventually reach 10.

=== Major commands to which assigned ===
- 1st Cavalry Division, United States Army Forces Pacific, (September 1945)
- Pacific Air Command, US Army, (September 1945 – January 1947)
- Far East Air Forces (January 1947 – July 1957)
- Pacific Air Forces (July 1957 – present)

== Role and operations ==
=== United States Air Force ===
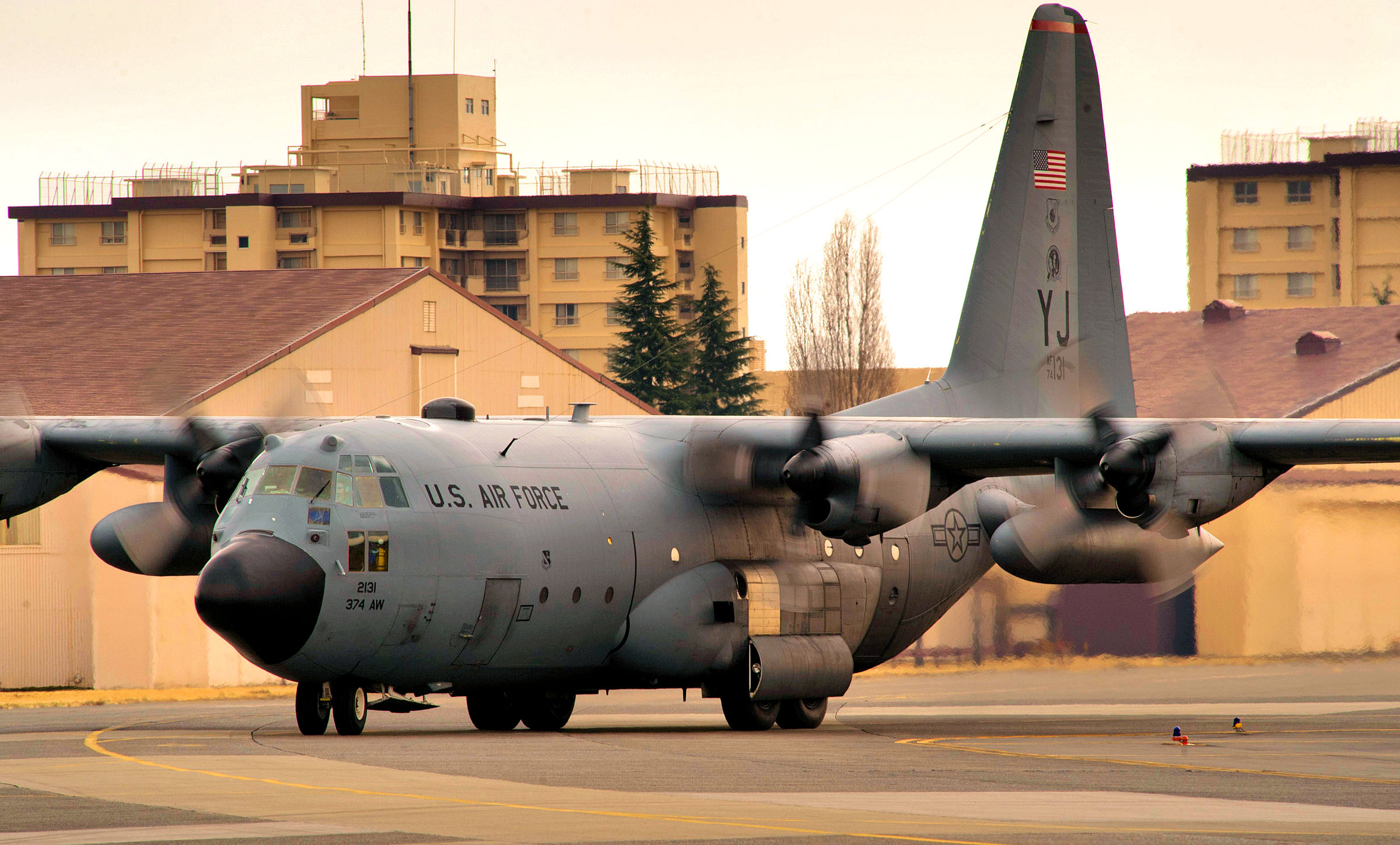
A C-130H Hercules taxis to park on the east side of the flightline at Yokota Air Base, Japan, 25 March 2011.

The host unit at Yokota is the 374th Airlift Wing and is currently used for airlift missions throughout East Asia. The 374th includes four groups: operations, mission support, maintenance and medical. Each group manages a various number of squadrons in order to carry out the wing's mission.

- 374th Operations Group (Tail Code: YJ)
  The 374th Operations Group maintains a forward presence by providing rapid responsive movement of personnel, equipment and operational support in the Asia-Pacific region. The group consists of:
  - 374th Operations Support Squadron
  - 36th Airlift Squadron (C-130J Super Hercules)
  - 459th Airlift Squadron (UH-1N Iroquois (Huey), C-12J Huron)

It is not uncommon to see a KC-135 Stratotanker, C-5 Galaxy, KC-10 Extender, C-130, C-17, or civilian charter (Omni Air International, Air Transport International etc. mostly Boeing 757 or 767) and cargo (Atlas Air, Kalitta Air etc. mostly Boeing 747) airline aircraft on military charters on the Transient Aircraft ramp.

- 374th Maintenance Group
  The 374th Maintenance Group maintains C-130J, C-12 and UH-1N aircraft supporting intratheater airlift and distinguished visitor transport for Pacific Air Forces.
- 374th Mission Support Group
  The 374th Mission Support Group is responsible to the 374th Airlift Wing Commander for the command, control, and direction of support activities to 374 AW and 32 tenant units including Headquarters US Forces Japan and Fifth Air Force.
- 374th Medical Group
  The 374th Medical Group ensures medical readiness of 374 AW, 5 AF, and US Forces Japan personnel. They also maintain 64 War Reserve Materiel projects, including the USAF's largest Patient Movement Item inventory.

RQ-4B Global Hawks of Detachment 1, 319th Operations Group deploy to Yokota from Andersen AFB in Guam during the typhoon season, normally between June and December.

==== AMC passenger terminal ====
The newly renovated Air Mobility Command (AMC) Passenger Terminal is on the main part of the base next to the flightline. It is a 5 to 7-minute walk from the Kanto Lodge (see below) and offers Space-Available flights to various destinations in PACAF such as Alaska, Guam, Hawaii, Korea, Okinawa, Singapore, as well as the Continental United States.

== Based units ==
Flying and notable non-flying units based at Yokota Air Base.

Units marked GSU are Geographically Separate Units, which although based at Yokota, are subordinate to a parent unit based at another location.

=== United States Air Force ===
Pacific Air Forces (PACAF)

- Fifth Air Force
  - Headquarters Fifth Air Force
  - 374th Airlift Wing (Host Wing)
    - Headquarters 374th Airlift Wing
    - 374th Operations Group
      - 36th Airlift Squadron – C-130J Hercules
      - 374th Operations Support Squadron
      - 1403 Military Airlift Squadron [C-21A Learjet]
      - 459th Airlift Squadron – UH-1N Iroquois and C-12J Huron
    - 374th Maintenance Group
      - 374th Aircraft Maintenance Squadron
      - 374th Maintenance Operations Squadron
      - 374th Maintenance Squadron
    - 374th Medical Group
      - 374th Aerospace Medicine Squadron
      - 374th Dental Squadron
      - 374th Medical Operations Squadron
      - 374th Medical Support Squadron
      - 374th Surgical Operations Squadron
    - 374th Mission Support Group
      - 374th Civil Engineer Squadron
      - 374th Communications Squadron
      - 374th Contracting Squadron
      - 374th Force Support Squadron
      - 374th Logistics Readiness Squadron
      - 374th Security Forces Squadron
- USAF Band of the Pacific - Asia

Air Force Special Operations Command (AFSOC)

- 353rd Special Operations Wing
  - 21st Special Operations Squadron (GSU) – CV-22B Osprey
  - 753rd Special Operations Aircraft Maintenance Squadron (GSU)

Air Combat Command (ACC)

- Sixteenth Air Force
  - 319th Reconnaissance Wing
    - 319th Operations Group
      - 4th Reconnaissance Squadron (seasonal) – RQ-4B Global Hawk

Air Mobility Command (AMC)

- United States Air Force Expeditionary Center
  - 515th Air Mobility Operations Wing
    - 515th Air Mobility Operations Group (GSU)
      - 730th Air Mobility Squadron

=== United States Space Force ===
United States Space Forces – Japan (USSPACEFOR-JPN)

=== United States Coast Guard ===
Coast Guard Pacific Area (PACAREA)

- Fourteenth District
  - US Coast Guard Activities Far East (FEACT)

=== United States Department of Defense ===
United States Indo-Pacific Command (USINDOPACOM)

- United States Forces Japan
  - Headquarters United States Forces Japan

=== Japan Air Self-Defense Force ===
Air Defense Command

- Air Defense Command Headquarters
- Air Tactics Development Wing Headquarters
- Air Intelligence Wing
- Operations Support Wing
- Yokota Regional Air Police Squadron
- Yokota Weather Squadron

== Lawsuits ==
Resistance to the air base immediately followed the end of US occupation. Gravel used in the construction of the airfields was taken from the Tama River, lowering the riverbed and affecting the traditional irrigation system (Fuchū-yōsui), which had provided water to local communities since the early Edo period. The base also caused great stress to nearby inhabitants in a number of other ways, such as fuel leaks and spills that contaminated groundwater and well water, foul odors and fires, deafening noise pollution, and repeated plane crashes. Although local leaders succeeded in bringing about the return of land that had been taken for the base in Tachikawa, at Yokota, the number of departures and landings per year reached 20,000. Pilot training that simulated landing jets on aircraft carriers was also held several times each year, often throughout the night. Because such training, together with the engine testing and daily flights, created a level of noise pollution that local inhabitants found unbearable, numerous lawsuits were filed against the Japanese and U.S. governments, calling for a halt in flights and compensation for damages caused by the noise pollution. At present, a small fraction of the compensation demanded for past damages appears likely to be awarded. "Yokota Airbase Pollution Lawsuit No. 9", filed on 12 December 2012 and "New Yokota Airbase Pollution Lawsuit No. 2", filed on 26 March 2013, are currently being disputed.

== Base amenities ==
=== The 374th Force Support Squadron ===
The 374th Force Support Squadron is responsible for providing an enhanced quality of life, facilities and programs for 11,000 military, civilian and dependents as well as 150,000 transient personnel per year. The 374th Force Support Squadron provides manpower and personnel support, membership clubs, child development, youth programs, food service, lodging, sports/fitness, recreation/leisure activities, comprehensive readiness program, marketing/publicity, linen exchange, and mortuary operations for Yokota AB.

=== Friendship Festival ===
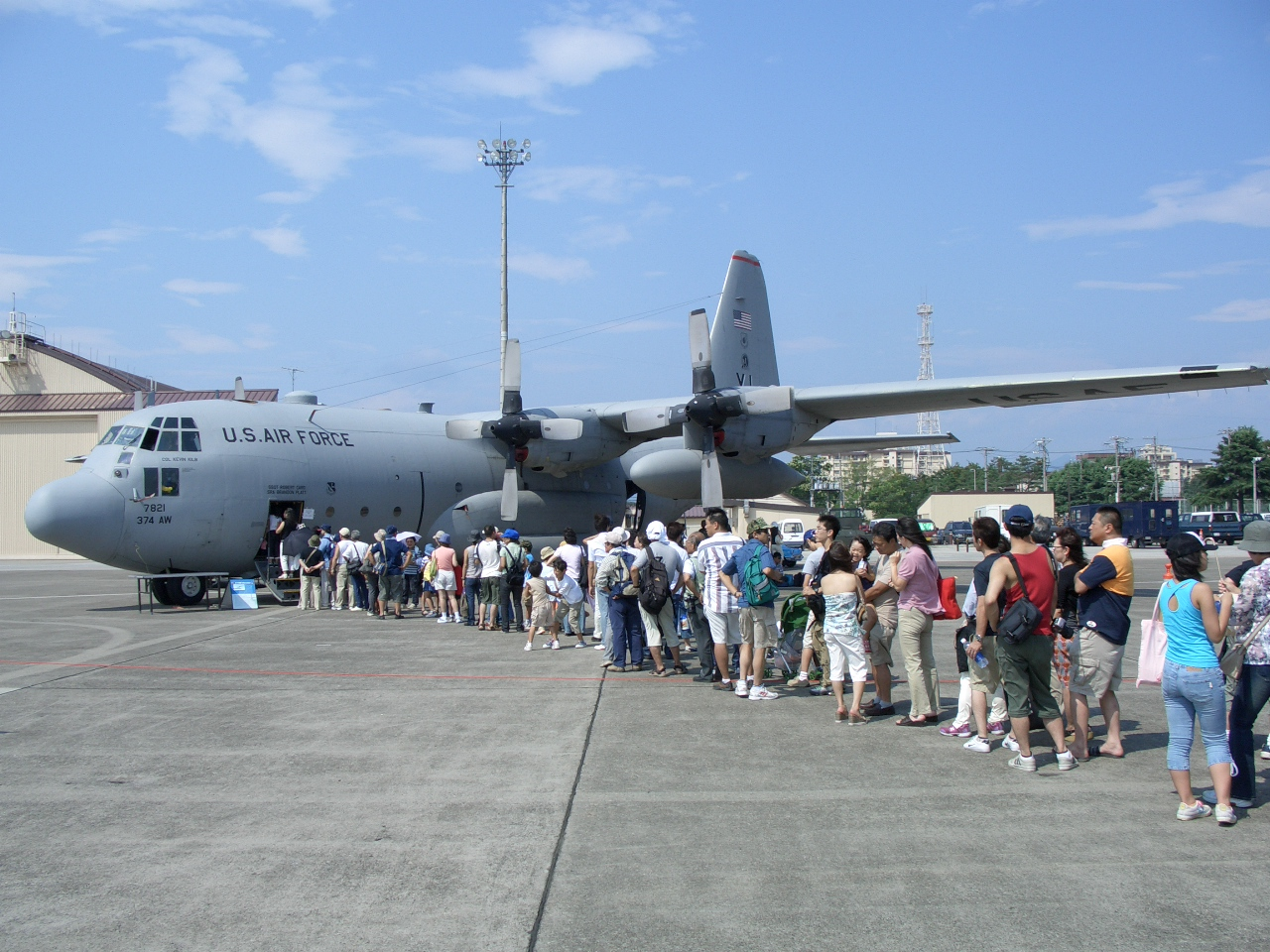
Friendship Festival – Local Japanese entering a C-130

Each year in May, Yokota Air Base opens the gates to the Japanese community for its annual Friendship Festival. For two days, local residents can learn about Yokota Air Base. Food and events are provided for all ages. Roughly 200,000 visitors show up each year, although non-Japanese visitors may be turned away from the gates for security reasons.

For those two days, visitors are able to examine many types of aircraft and tour some of the large cargo planes from inside. Each year, service member volunteers base-wide form "D Squadron" for the event, offering some visitors an enhanced on-base experience.

In 2020 and 2021, it was canceled due to the spread of the COVID-19 pandemic. The 2022 festival was held on 21 and 22 May, three months earlier than usual. On 22 May, the 46th President of the United States, Joe Biden, visited Japan with the arrival of related equipment, including the dedicated Air Force One, but the Friendship Festival was held as scheduled.

=== Education ===
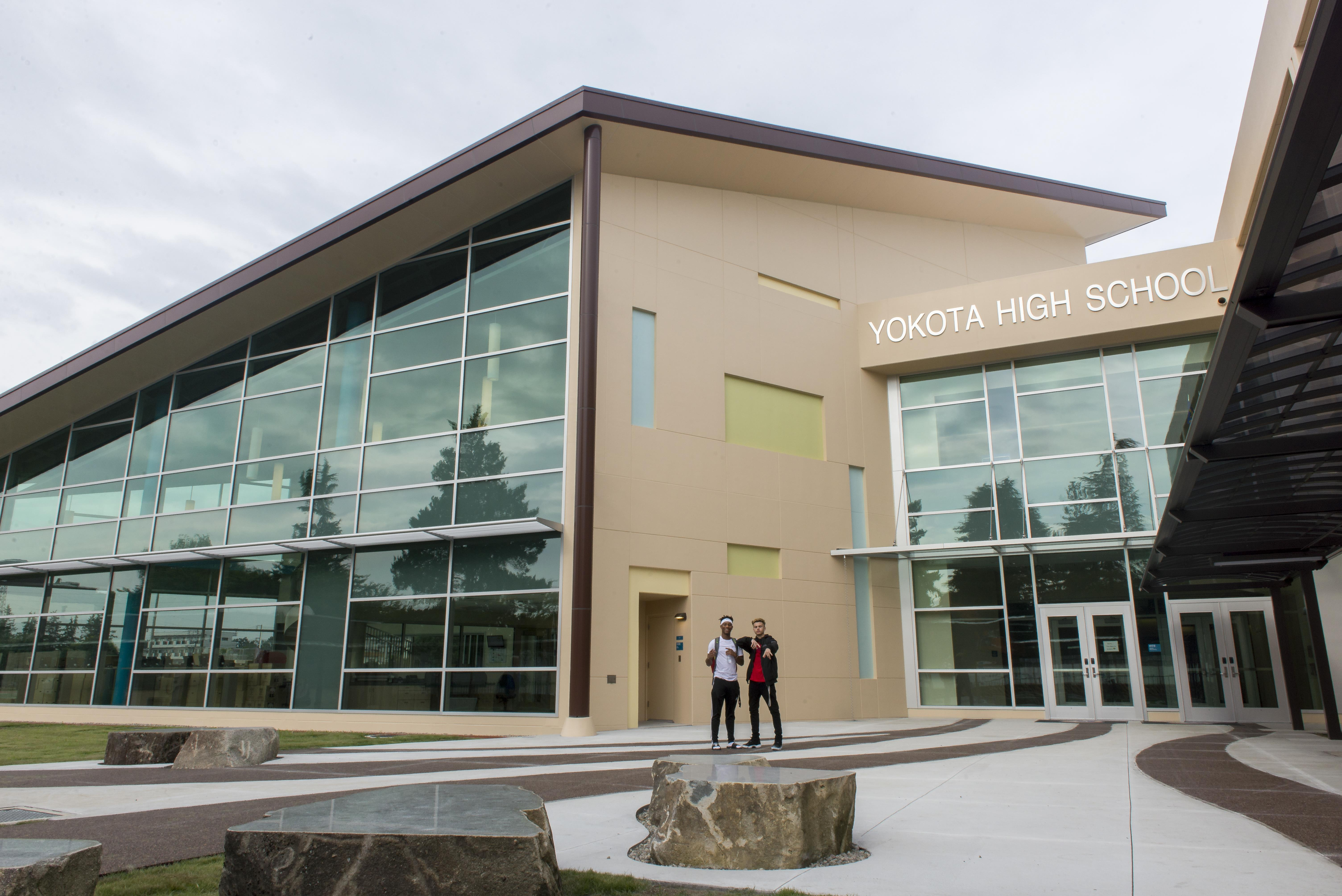
Yokota High School

The Department of Defense Education Activity operates schools at Yokota for children of personnel assigned to the base.

- Joan K. Mendel Elementary School (formerly known as Yokota East Elementary School)
- Yokota West Elementary School
- Yokota Middle School: School Dedication Ceremony took place on 13 June 2000. YMS initial year began with only grades 7 and 8, with the upstairs specialty wing housing High School classes until construction modifications to YHS were completed. Class officially began August 2000.
- Yokota High School: The Home of the Yokota Panthers. The school was constructed in 1973. A new "21st century" school started construction in 2015 and finished in 2017. The new school replaced the old Yokota High School.

Higher educational opportunities for those in the military and working for the Department of Defense, as well as for family members at Yokota are available through several contracted academic institutions. For example:

- The Asian Division of University of Maryland Global Campus (UMGC) (known as the University of Maryland University College until July 1, 2019)

=== Tama Hills Recreation Area ===
The Tama Hills Recreation Area comprises about one-half of the 500-acre Tama Services Division Annex, the other half being the Tama Hills Golf Course.

== In popular culture ==
The base was the setting of Almost Transparent Blue, a best-selling novel written by Ryu Murakami and published in 1976, as well as the anime Blood the Last Vampire and the short film Baby Blue from Genius Party, directed by Shinichiro Watanabe. Yokota Air Base and its surrounding area were the central location for the 2006 movie Sugar and Spice and mentioned briefly in Patlabor 2: The Movie. It is also the setting of parts of The Yokota Officers Club : A Novel by Sarah Bird. The base is also the birthplace of US Marine Captain, former UFC fighter and Fox Sports analyst Brian Stann. The base was also briefly featured in the 2016 biopic Snowden as one of Edward Snowden's workplaces.

== Bibliography ==
- Fletcher, Harry R. (1989) Air Force Bases Volume II, Active Air Force Bases outside the United States of America on 17 September 1982. Maxwell AFB, Alabama: Office of Air Force History. ISBN 0-912799-53-6
- Maurer, Maurer (1983). Air Force Combat Units of World War II. Maxwell AFB, Alabama: Office of Air Force History. ISBN 0-89201-092-4.
- Ravenstein, Charles A. (1984). Air Force Combat Wings Lineage and Honors Histories 1947–1977. Maxwell AFB, Alabama: Office of Air Force History. ISBN 0-912799-12-9.
- Rogers, Brian (2005). United States Air Force Unit Designations Since 1978. Hinkley, England: Midland Publications. ISBN 1-85780-197-0.
