= Congressional Caucus on International Exchange and Study =

The Congressional International Exchange and Study Caucus is a caucus of the United States Congress that aims to raise awareness of the importance and benefits of international exchange and study abroad programs, which enable international citizens to have meaningful exchange experiences in the United States, and Americans to have such beneficial experiences in other countries. It is co-chaired in the 114th Congress by Representatives Steve Pearce of New Mexico and Jim Himes of Connecticut.

== Background ==
International exchange and study programs are a way for the United States to remain internationally competitive, develop leaders, and promote American values. These programs support global engagement that is critical to our economy and national security.

Professional, academic, and cultural exchange programs reach a diverse set of participants in the United States and nearly 200 countries around the world. Exchanges increase America's global reach and build durable connections based on mutual understanding and respect. These programs serve a diplomatic function, also known as soft power, contributing to the global view of the United States and are a way for American students and professionals to develop skills such as foreign languages and cultural awareness that American employers conducting business abroad tend to seek.

These exchanges play increasingly important diplomatic and economic roles, while simultaneously encouraging goodwill towards the U.S. globally.

— Rep. Steve Pearce (R- NM2)

In addition to enhancing America's competitiveness, international exchange and study programs provide significant immediate benefits to our nation's economy. Most of the U.S. Department of State's exchange program budget is spent either on Americans, American businesses and organizations, or in the United States. Exchange participants do business with U.S. small businesses, airlines, hotels, and non-governmental organizations in local communities and their presence in our colleges and universities supports U.S. academic institutions and enriches the experience of American students.

International exchange and study programs are of particular importance in today's global economy. These programs provide an unequaled understanding of world cultures – one that can translate into the success of American businesses, growth of the U.S. economy, and increased global and national security.

— Rep. Jim Himes (D-CT4)

=== International Exchange Programs ===
The U.S. Department of State funds a vast range of international exchange programs, such as the Fulbright Program, Kennedy-Lugar Youth Exchange and Study (YES) Program, Congress Bundestag Youth Exchange (CBYX) Program, Critical Language Scholarship (CLS) Program, American Council of Young Political Leaders (ACYPL), SportsUnited, and virtual exchange programs. These programs aim to bring international engagement to classrooms and communities where travel options may be limited. These programs serve young people, who develop skills as they serve as ambassadors of American youth around the world.

Other federally funded programs, including the International Visitor Leadership Program (IVLP) and the Young African Leaders Initiative (YALI), bring talented leaders from a variety of fields to the U.S. to expand their professional skills and networks. State Department evaluations repeatedly show that these and other participants who visit the United States through exchange programs leave with a better impression of our country, the American people, and our values. U.S. ambassadors consistently rank exchange programs among the most useful catalysts for long-term political change and mutual understanding.

=== J-1 Exchange Visitor Program (EVP) ===
The U.S. Department of State's J-1 Exchange Visitor Program (EVP) annually engages nearly 300,000 future leaders from around the world and advances key U.S. foreign policy priorities – at virtually no cost to the American taxpayer. All of these exchange programs are privately funded and allow the U.S. to engage a wide variety of international participants at different points in their studies and careers, exposing them to the U.S., the American people, and American values and customs. These programs reach high priority audiences across the globe, including in countries key to U.S. foreign policy and national security interests: 86% of J-1 participants are under the age of 30, 46% are age 21 or under, and 53% of participants are female. 71,000 J-1 participants studied at U.S. high schools and universities across all 50 states just last year. More than 90% of all of J-1 participants have reported a more positive opinion of the U.S. and Americans following their programs, according to J-1 sponsor surveys.

J-1 exchange programs include a wide variety of participant categories, including: Au Pair, Camp Counselor, College and University Student, Intern, Professor and Research Scholar, Secondary School Student, Short-Term Scholar, Summer Work Travel, Teacher, and Trainee.

The U.S. Department of Education, U.S. Department of Defense, and almost all government agencies support programs encouraging the creation of international connections and expertise.

== Members of the caucus during the 114th Congress ==
House
Representative	Party	State – Congressional District
Steve Pearce (Co-Chair)	Republican	New Mexico – 2nd
Jim Himes (Co-Chair)	Democratic	Connecticut – 4th
John Carney	Democratic	Delaware – At-Large
Brett Guthrie	Republican	Kentucky – 2nd
Lynn Jenkins	Republican	Kansas – 2nd
Derek Kilmer	Democratic	Washington – 6th
Ann McLane Kuster	Democratic	New Hampshire – 2nd
Blaine Luetkemeyer	Republican	Missouri – 3rd
Jim McGovern	Democratic	Massachusetts – 2nd
Reid Ribble	Republican	Wisconsin – 8th
Kathleen Rice	Democratic	New York – 4th
Paul Tonko	Democratic	New York – 20th

== Caucus Activities ==
The Caucus will provide a vital function for members of Congress and their constituents by serving as a clearinghouse of information for members who would like to notify constituents of exchange opportunities and engage with international exchange participants in their districts. The Caucus may also sponsor occasional events to inform members and staff about the purpose and efficacy of various exchange programs. Additionally, Caucus members can be a voice for international exchanges and the important diplomatic function our citizens serve in spreading American values and culture through their involvement as both overseas participants and hosts of international citizens in the U.S.

== History ==
The efforts to establish the Caucus were led by AFS-USA (formerly the American Field Service) and the Alliance for International Educational and Cultural Exchange.
