= Ayusa =

AYUSA
- Company type: Non-profit
- Industry: Education
- Founded: United States: San Francisco
- Revenue: 5,592,409 United States dollar (2022)
- Total assets: 3,185,280 United States dollar (2022)
- Website: ayusa.org

Ayusa (Ayusa International) is a non-profit organization dedicated to promote global learning and leadership through foreign exchange, study abroad, and leadership programs for high school students from the U.S. and around the world. The organization was co-founded by John Wilhelm and Takeshi Yokota in 1981 and is headquartered in San Francisco, California. John Wilhelm and Takeshi Yokota also founded Intrax.

Ayusa is a founding member of the Counsel on Standards for International Educational Travel (CSIET) and has received a full listing as an accredited exchange organization for 25 years, since CSIET's inception.

Ayusa matches American host families (in all 50 states) with international high school students between the ages of 15 and 18 years old for an academic year or semester. Ayusa also has various short and long-term study abroad programs for American high school students between the ages of 15 and 18 years old.

== Programs ==
=== Grant programs ===
Ayusa currently administers several grant programs funded by the Bureau of Educational and Cultural Affairs, United States Department of State including the Kennedy-Lugar Youth Exchange and Study Programs (YES) and the Congress-Bundestag Youth Exchange Program (CBYX). In the past, Ayusa has also administered several other U.S. Department of State grants, including the Future Leaders Exchange Program (FLEX), the Mexico Youth Leadership Program (Jóvenes en Acción), and the Emerging Youth Leaders Program.

== See also ==
- World Link
- Youth For Understanding
