= American Councils for International Education =

American educational non-profit organization

American Council for International Education
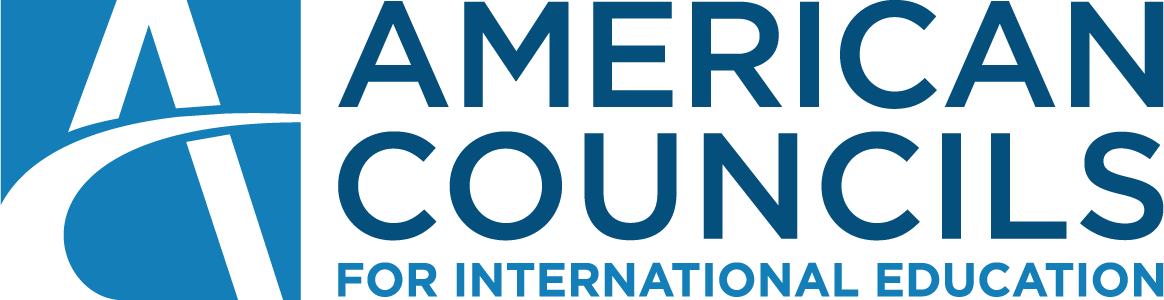
- Established: 1974; 52 years ago
- Type: Education policy nonprofit
- Legal status: 501(c)(3)
- Headquarters: 1828 L St, NW
- Location: Washington, D.C., United States
- Region served: worldwide
- President: Lisa Choate
- Website: americancouncils.org

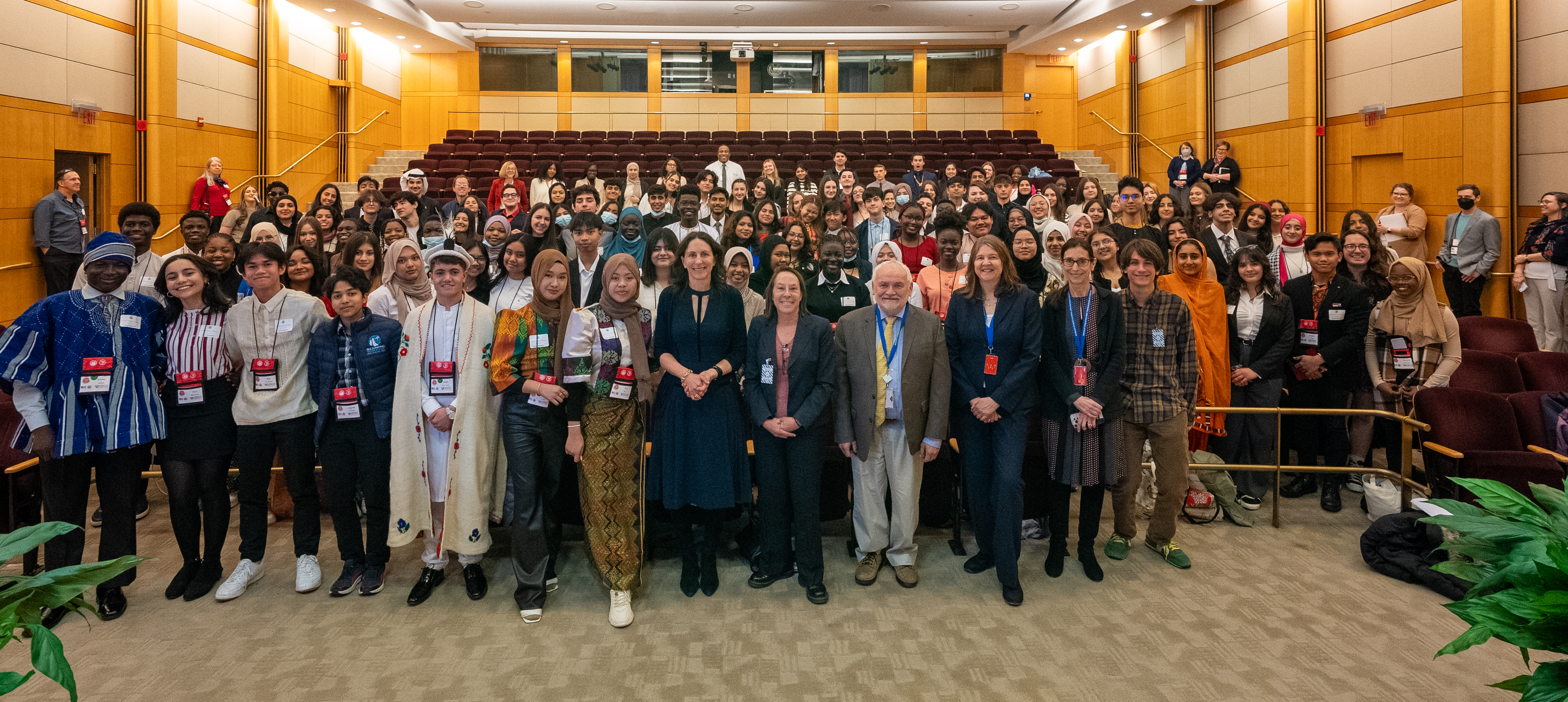
Foreign exchange students meeting officials at the U.S. Department of State during the Civic Education Workshop, administered by American Councils.

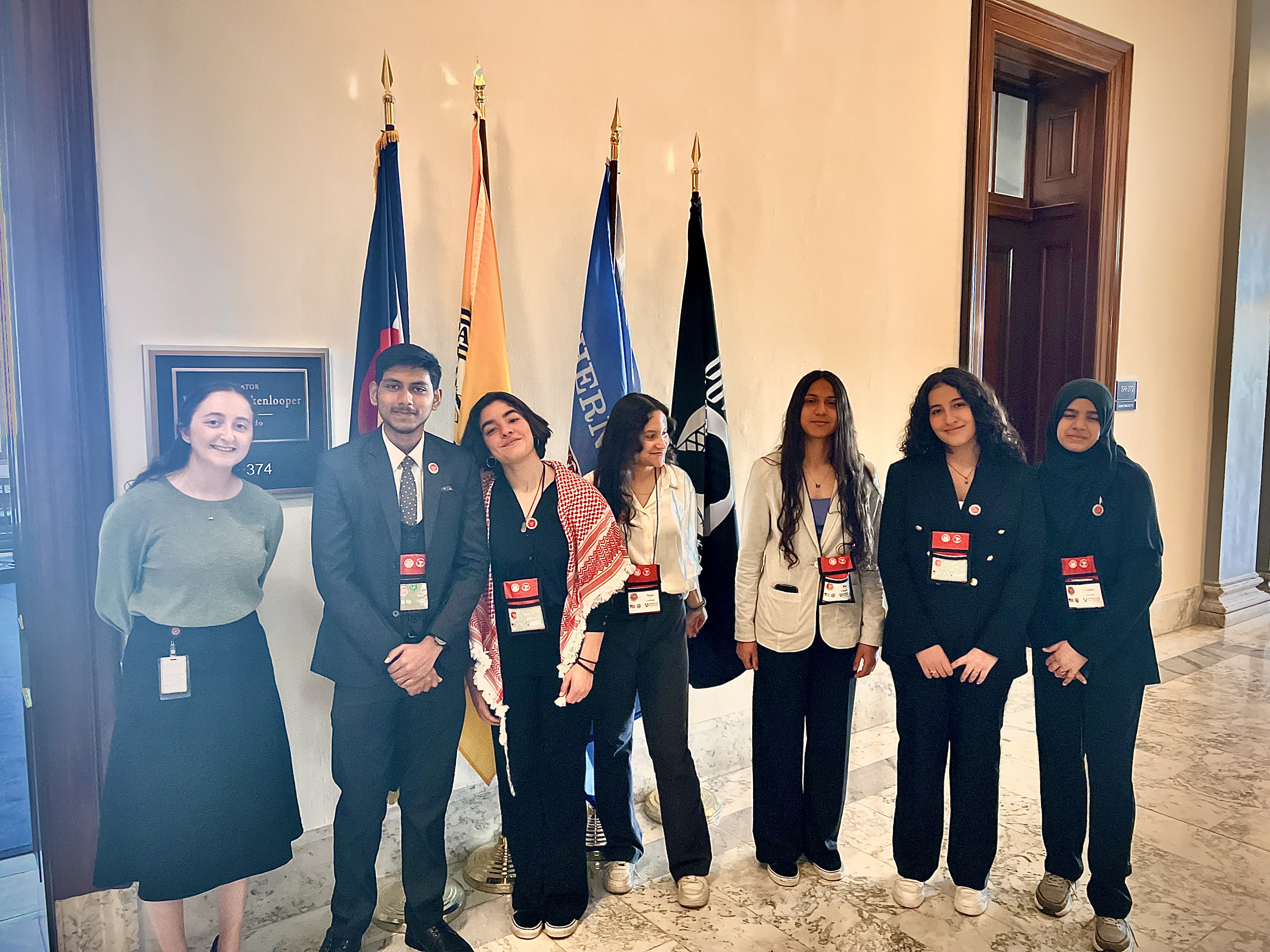
Foreign exchange students meeting with the office of John Hickenlooper, senator of Colorado at the Russell Senate building as part of the Civic Education Workshop, administered by American Councils.

American Councils for International Education (commonly American Councils) is an international non-profit organization headquartered in Washington, D.C. Founded in 1974, the organization runs programs to support cross-cultural understanding and international education, including through academic exchange programs and research.

== History ==
American Councils was established in 1974 to expand academic exchanges between the United States and countries. Initially focusing on educational programs with the Soviet Union and Eastern Europe during the Cold War, the organization has since expanded its scope to other regions.

In early 2024, American Councils was designated as an "undesirable organization" in Russia.

== Programs ==
By providing opportunities for individuals to engage with different cultures, languages, and academic disciplines, the organization aims to contribute to the development of a more interconnected and informed global community. Programs for students, educators, professionals, and policymakers include:

- Study abroad opportunities for American students.
- Scholarship programs like the Kennedy Lugar Youth Exchange and Study, Future Leaders Exchange, Congress-Bundestag Youth Exchange and others to support international students seeking to study in the United States, as well as American students pursuing academic endeavors abroad.
- Professional exchange programs for educators, researchers, and professionals in fields such as education, public policy, and cultural heritage preservation.

American Councils collaborates with government agencies, educational institutions, non-profit organizations, and private sector partners to implement its programs and initiatives.
