= Near East and South Asia Undergraduate Exchange Program =

The Near East and South Asia Undergraduate Exchange Program or Near East, South Asia, and Sub-Saharan Africa Undergraduate Exchange Program is an American international student exchange program. It enables students from the Near East, South Asia and Sub-Saharan Africa to attend American universities for a year of study. It is managed by World Learning for the Bureau of Educational and Cultural Affairs of the United States Department of State, and is a part of the Bureau's Global Undergraduate Exchange Program. In the academic year 2013–2014, students who visited the United States under the program came from Algeria, Angola, Bahrain, Bangladesh, Egypt, Ghana, India, Israel, Jordan, Kenya, Lebanon, Libya, Mauritania, Morocco, Mozambique, Nepal, Niger, Oman, the Palestinian Territories, Pakistan, Saudi Arabia, South Africa, Tunisia, Uganda, the United Arab Emirates and Yemen.

== See also ==
- Kennedy-Lugar Youth Exchange and Study Programs
- Fulbright Scholarship Program
- Future Leaders Exchange
