= Youth ambassador =

Young agent, representative, and steward

A youth ambassador is a young agent, representative and/or steward for the charity for which they work.

Youth ambassadors have been introduced in order to promote participation, or spread goodwill or knowledge. Organizations that make use of youth ambassadors vary from charitable organizations for children to intergovernmental organizations, like the Caribbean Community (CARICOM), the United Nations for the support of the Millennium Development Goals (MDG), the U.S. Department of State's KL-YES program and for other organizations.

== See also ==
- Goodwill ambassador
