= CEW =

CEW may refer to:

- Center on Education and the Workforce, a research institute affiliated with Georgetown University in Washington, DC
- Clinton Engineer Works, a Manhattan Project plant
- Conducted electrical weapon (CEW), a weapon that delivers an electrical shock
- Civic Education Workshop, an event organized by the State Department in Washington DC
- Cosmetic Executive Women, a trade organization for the personal care industry
- The IATA code for Bob Sikes Airport

== See also ==
- CEWS (disambiguation)
