= Civic Education Workshop =

State Department funded workshop in Washington, DC

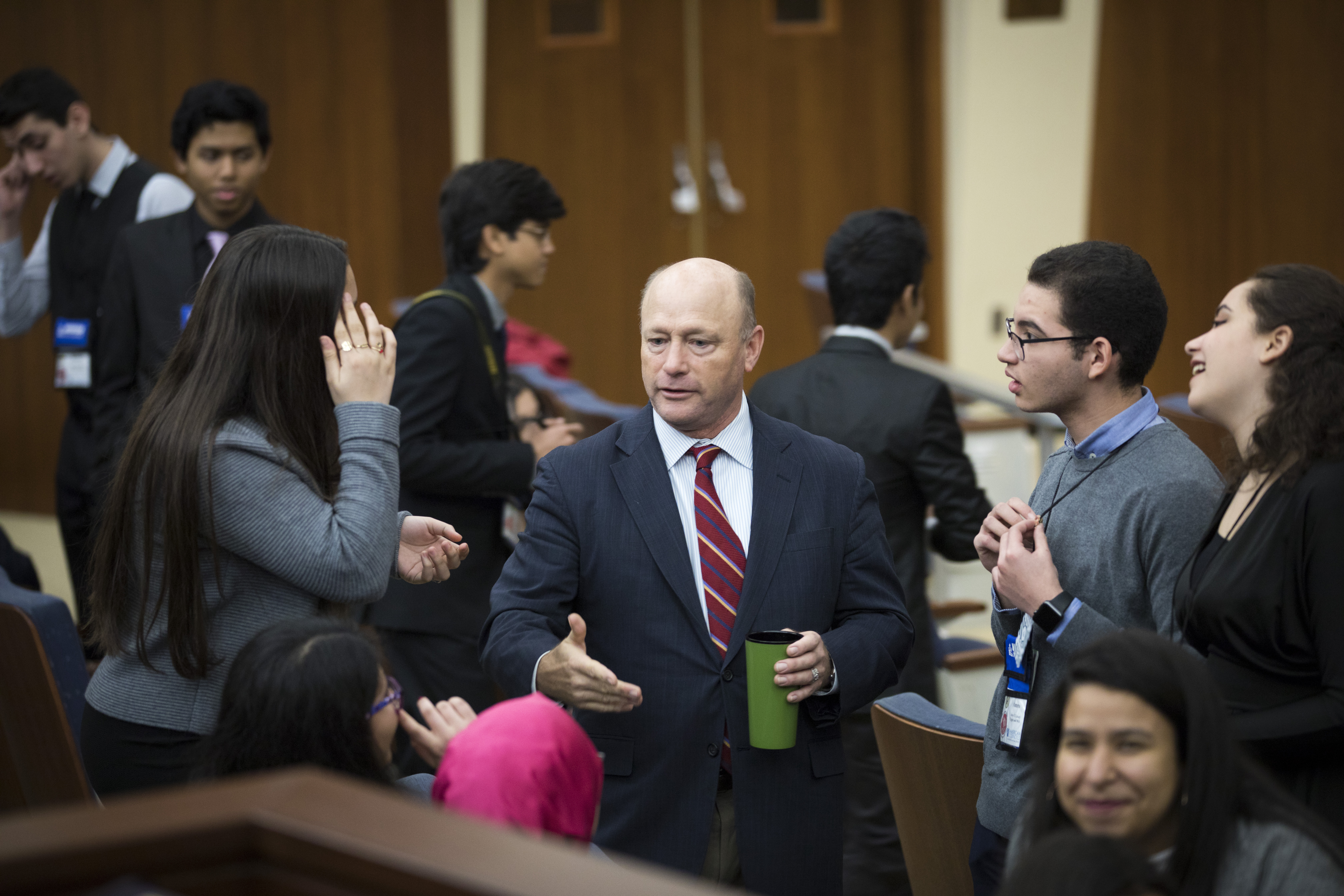
YES students meeting with officials at the U.S. Department of State, February 2018

The Civic Education Workshop (CEW) is an annual, week-long program organized in Washington, DC and funded by the U.S. Department of State. The program takes place every year for select participants of the Kennedy Lugar Youth Exchange and Study (KL-YES), Future Leaders Exchange (FLEX) and the Congress-Bundestag Youth Exchange (CBYX) programs. The workshop gives student ambassadors the opportunity to learn firsthand about the U.S. federal system of government and other important concepts through seminars, discussions with senators and elected officials, briefings, and meetings on Capitol Hill.

== History ==
Established in 1993, CEW emerged from the belief that exchanging ideas about civics and democracy between young people from different countries would strengthen mutual understanding and promote global cooperation. Over the years, it has developed into a signature program for YES, FLEX, and CBYX, impacting thousands of students from around the world.

== Selection process ==
Participation in CEW is highly competitive, with selection processes prioritizing academic excellence, leadership potential, and a demonstrated commitment to community service. Once selected, the program ensures accessibility for participants by covering all expenses, including travel, accommodation, meals, and program activities.

== Activities ==
Through interactive workshops, seminars, and discussions, the program encourages participants to engage in debates about social issues, developing analytical skills and a deeper understanding of diverse viewpoints. Participants witness U.S. democracy in action through site visits to key institutions like the Capitol Building, Supreme Court, and Library of Congress, as well as meetings with elected officials, journalists, and community leaders.

== Impact ==
CEW contributes to international relations by building bridges between young people from diverse backgrounds, promoting mutual respect and appreciation for democratic values. It develops participants' leadership skills and encourages them to become active citizens in their own communities. Alumni often cite the program as a unique experience that shaped their civic engagement, leadership skills, and global perspective.
