= Toni Blackman =

American rapper

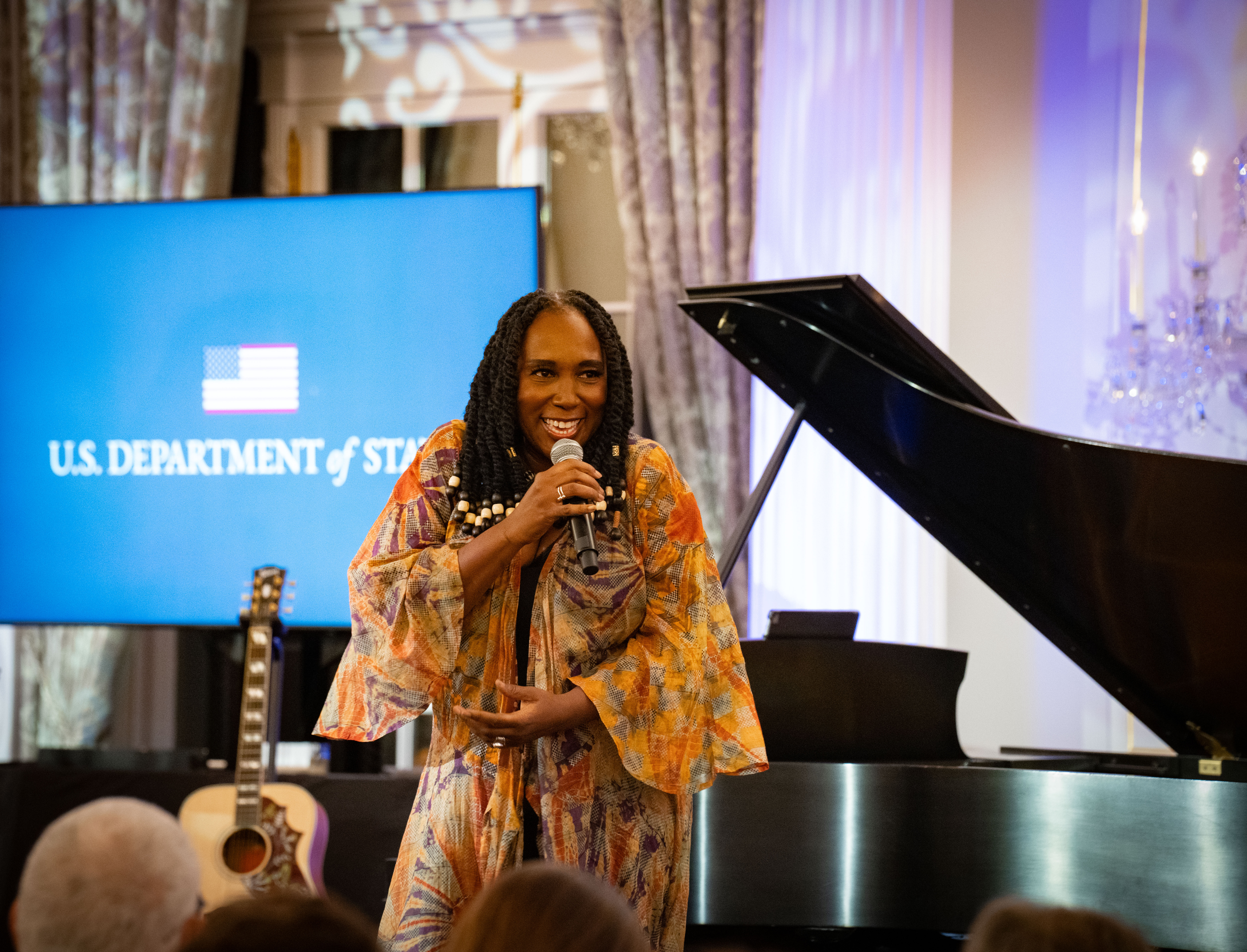
- Blackman in 2023

Background information
- Also known as: Miss Blackman; T-lala; Virgo One
- Born: Pittsburg, California, U.S.
- Origin: San Francisco Bay Area, California
- Genres: Hip hop, hip hop soul, global hip hop, spoken word
- Occupations: Rapper, lyricist, MC, freestyle MC, songwriter, poet, educator, author
- Years active: 1992–present
- Label: Independent Ear
- Website: http://www.toniblackman.com

Toni Blackman is an American rapper (specializing in freestyle hip-hop) and writer who was the first hip-hop ambassador to the U.S. State Department. Additionally, she was selected as a 2006 Rhythm Road touring artist and subsequently served as on the selection committee for American Music Abroad (formerly Jazz at Lincoln Center's Rhythm Road) with the American Voices.

== Life and career ==
The first Hip Hop Cultural Envoy to travel with the State Department, Blackman served in Senegal, Ivory Coast, the Democratic Republic of the Congo, Ghana, Botswana and Swaziland where she also delivered lectures on hip hop music and culture. Toni has also travelled throughout Europe, Angola, Brazil, Canada and toured Southeast Asia and Taiwan as a part of Jazz at Lincoln Center Rhythm Road Abroad program, working in the world's most war-torn countries to promote reconciliation and rehabilitation to those regions.

Blackman was founding director of Freestyle Union, a cypher workshop which uses freestyle rap as a tool to promote social responsibility, was awarded, two prestigious fellowships. Blackman served as a fellow with the Echoing Green Foundation and as a fellow with the Open Society Institute (Soros Foundation) through which she launched Rhyme Like A Girl formerly known as ADI. A hip hop theater pioneer, she founded the now-defunct Hip Hop Arts Movement (HHAM) while at Howard University in 1992. She has featured in the Hip Hop Theater Festival and she co-authored Hip Hop Nightmares of Jujube Brown with Psalmayene 24 as an ACT-Co presentation at ARENA Stage in Washington, DC. She is also a member of the Spoken Word Committee of the New York Chapter of the Recording Academy.

Blackman has performed alongside Erykah Badu, Mos Def, Guru, The Roots, Wu Tang, the Lilith Fair, Def Poetry. She performed in a host of venues including the Kennedy Center in Washington, DC, and at Lincoln Center in New York.

In 2009, Blackman spoke at the Pio Manzù International Conference in Rimini, Italy, and in 2010 facilitated a groundbreaking artist residency at Jefferson Arts Center with girls from Liberia, Sudan, Somalia, and the United States. She also spoke at Harvard University as a part of Bakari Kitwana's Rap Sessions Series.

An interview with Blackman is featured in a scholarly article about girls and "bad bitches" in hip-hop online video culture written by ethnomusicologist and social media scholar Kyra Gaunt in the Journal of Popular Music Studies (2015).
