= International Visitor Leadership Program =

Exchange program funded by the US government

The International Visitor Leadership Program (IVLP) is a professional exchange program funded by the U.S. Department of State's Bureau of Educational and Cultural Affairs. The mission of IVLP is to offer current and emerging international leaders the opportunity to experience the richness and diversity of American political, economic, social and cultural life through carefully designed exchanges that reflect participants’ professional interests and the public diplomacy objectives of the United States government.

up to three weeks. The program is nomination only by staff at U.S. Embassies.

== The exchange brings up to 5000 professional emerging leaders from around the world to the United States each year for programs of History ==
In 1940, Nelson Rockefeller was named the Coordinator of Commercial and Cultural Affairs for the American Republics. He initiated the exchange of persons program with Latin America, inviting 130 Latin American journalists to the United States and recognized as the first exchange under what would become the IVLP. In 1948 representative Karl E. Mundt and Senator H. Alexander Smith marshaled the Informational and Educational Exchange Act, also known as the Smith-Mundt Act which was passed by the 80th United States Congress and approved by President Harry S. Truman. During a time when Americans grew increasingly concerned about Soviet propaganda, the purpose of the Smith-Mundt was "to promote a better understanding of the United States in other countries, and to increase mutual understanding between the people of the United States and the people of other countries" through educational and cultural exchanges. From this legislation birthed the Foreign Leaders Program, which was eventually consolidated into the International Visitor Program (IVP) in 1952. In 2004, the IVP was renamed the International Visitor Leadership Program (IVLP).

== Goals ==
The purpose of the IVLP is to:

1. cultivate lasting relationships between current and emerging professionals around the world and their American counterparts
2. provides opportunities for foreign opinion makers to gain firsthand knowledge about U.S. society, culture and politics

== Notable alumni ==
The following tables list the 339 current and former chiefs of state and heads of government who have participated in the International Visitor Leadership Program.

=== East Asia and Pacific ===
Country	Name	Highest Position	Year Participated
Australia	Julia Gillard	Prime Minister	2006
Australia	Quentin Bryce	Governor General	1978
Australia	Paul Keating	Prime Minister	1977
Australia	William Hayden	Governor General	1970
Australia	Malcolm Fraser	Prime Minister	1964
Australia	Gough Whitlam	Prime Minister	1964
Cook Islands	Terepai Maoate	Prime Minister	1987
Federated States of Micronesia	Tosiwo Nakayama	President	1961
Fiji	Kamisese Mara	Acting President	1964
Fiji	Penaia Ganilau	President	1963
Fiji	George Cakobau	Governor General	1964
Indonesia	Megawati Sukarnoputri	President	1989
Indonesia	Abdurrahman Wahid	President	1979
Japan	Naoto Kan	Prime Minister	1981, 1980
Japan	Yukio Hatoyama	Prime Minister	1988
Japan	Morihiro Hosokawa	Prime Minister	1980
Japan	Toshiki Kaifu	Prime Minister	2000, 1962
Malaysia	Mahathir Mohamad	Prime Minister	1973
Malaysia	Abdul Razak Hussein	Prime Minister	1963, 1953
Mongolia	Nambaryn Enkhbayar	President	1994
New Zealand	Jacinda Ardern	Prime Minister	2012
New Zealand	Helen Clark	Prime Minister	1998
New Zealand	Jenny Shipley	Prime Minister	1989
New Zealand	David Lange	Prime Minister	1983
New Zealand	Norman Kirk	Prime Minister	1971, 1962
New Zealand	Rob Muldoon	Prime Minister	1965
New Zealand	Wallace E. Rowling	Prime Minister	1967
New Zealand	Jack Marshall	Prime Minister	1958
Palau	Lazarus Salii	President	1968
Papua New Guinea	Ignatius Kilage	Governor-General	1976
Papua New Guinea	Michael Somare	Prime Minister	1971
Philippines	Gloria Macapagal Arroyo	President	1964
Philippines	Sara Duterte	Vice President	2020
Samoa	Vaai Kolone	Prime Minister	1981
Singapore	Wee Kim Wee	President	1964
Singapore	Devan Nair	President	1979
South Korea	Kim Dae-jung	President	1965
South Korea	Kim Yong-sam	President	1964
South Korea	Han Seung-soo	Prime Minister	1977
South Korea	Hyun Seung-jong	Acting Prime Minister	1971
South Korea	Lee Yung-duk	Prime Minister	1966
South Korea	Kim Sang-hyup	Prime Minister	1970, 1960
South Korea	Nam Duck-woo	Prime Minister	1975
South Korea	Chung Il-kwon	Prime Minister	1971
South Korea	Lee Han-key	Prime Minister	1972
South Korea	Choi Doo-sun	Prime Minister	1950
Taiwan	Ma Ying-jeou	President	2003, 1971
Taiwan	Chen Shui-bian	President	1990
Thailand	Chuan Leekpai	Prime Minister	1971
Tonga	Taufa'ahau Tupou IV	King	1964
Tonga	Fatafehi Tu'ipelehake	Prime Minister	1968
Vanuatu	Walter Lini	Prime Minister	1976

=== Europe ===
Country/Region	Name	Highest Position	Year Participated
Albania	Bashkim Fino	Prime Minister	1996, 1995
Austria	Heinz Fischer	President	1964
Austria	Alfred Gusenbauer	Chancellor	1987
Austria	Wolfgang Schüssel	Chancellor	1984, 1971
Austria	Franz Vranitzky	Chancellor	1975
Austria	Bruno Kreisky	Chancellor	1958
Austria	Fred Sinowatz	Chancellor	1965
Belgium	Yves Leterme	Prime Minister	1983
Belgium	Guy Verhofstadt	Prime Minister	1983
Belgium	Wilfried Martens	Prime Minister	1971
Belgium	Leo Tindemans	Prime Minister	1967
Belgium	Mark Eyskens	Prime Minister	1984
Bosnia and Herzegovina	Mladen Ivanić	Member of Presidency	
Bulgaria	Sergei Stanishev	Prime Minister	2004
Bulgaria	Zhan Videnov	Prime Minister	1992
Bulgaria	Philip Dimitrov	Prime Minister	1990
Croatia	Zoran Milanović	Prime Minister	1996
Croatia	Ivo Josipović	President	2002
Croatia	Ivica Racan	Prime Minister	1998
Croatia	Zlatko Tomčić	President	1998
Cyprus	Tassos Papadopoulos	President	1968
Czech Republic	Petr Nečas	Prime Minister	1999, 1994
Denmark	Lars Løkke Rasmussen	Prime Minister	1989
Denmark	Anders Fogh Rasmussen	Prime Minister	1982
Denmark	Poul Nyrup Rasmussen	Prime Minister	1985
Estonia	Juhan Parts	Prime Minister	2005, 1992
Finland	Sauli Niinistö	President	1992
Finland	Tarja Halonen	President	1983
Finland	Jyrki Katainen	Prime Minister	2003
Finland	Matti Vanhanen	Prime Minister	1993
Finland	Paavo Lipponen	Prime Minister	1974
Finland	Esko Aho	Prime Minister	1979
Finland	Harri Holkeri	Prime Minister	1970
Finland	Anneli Tuulikki Jaatteenmaki	Prime Minister	1995
France	Nicolas Sarkozy	President	1985
France	François Fillon	Prime Minister	1984
France	Lionel Jospin	Prime Minister	1977
France	Alain Juppé	Prime Minister	1978
France	Raymond Barre	Prime Minister	1965
France	Pierre Bérégovoy	Prime Minister	1977
France	Valéry Giscard d'Estaing	President	1956
France	Jacques Chaban-Delmas	Prime Minister	1961
France	Michel Debré	Prime Minister	1956
Georgia	Mikheil Saakashvili	President	1999
Georgia	Zurab Noghaideli	Prime Minister	1997
Georgia	Zurab Zhvania	Prime Minister	1997
Germany	Joachim Gauck	President	1993
Germany	Christian Wulff	President	2000
Germany	Gerhard Schröder	Chancellor	1981
Germany	Richard von Weizsäcker	President	1978
Germany	Walter Scheel	President	1951
Germany	Karl Carstens	President	1950
Germany	Kurt Georg Kiesinger	Chancellor	1954
Germany	Willy Brandt	Chancellor	1954
Germany	Helmut Schmidt	Chancellor	1956
Greece	Konstandinos Karamanlis	Prime Minister	1995
Greece	Constantine Mitsotakis	Prime Minister	1959
Greece	Constantine Karamanlis	President	1951
Greece	Constantine Tsatsos	President	1952
Greece	George Rallis	Prime Minister	1958, 1953
Hungary	Gyula Horn	Prime Minister	1981
Hungary	József Antall	Prime Minister	1989
Iceland	Geir Haarde	Prime Minister	1985
Iceland	David Oddsson	Prime Minister	1983
Iceland	Thorsteinn Palsson	Prime Minister	1984
Iceland	Kristjan Eldjarn	President	1957
Ireland	Enda Kenny	Prime Minister	1989
Ireland	Mary Robinson	President	1976
Ireland	John Bruton	Prime Minister	1980
Italy	Oscar Luigi Scalfaro	President	1960
Italy	Francesco Cossiga	President	1966
Italy	Giuseppe Saragat	President	1963
Italy	Mario Monti	Prime Minister	1981
Italy	Romano Prodi	Prime Minister	1979
Italy	Giovanni Goria	Prime Minister	1981
Italy	Giovanni Spadolini	Prime Minister	1952
Italy	Arnaldo Forlani	Prime Minister	1960
Kosovo	Fatmir Sejdiu	President	2003
Kosovo	Bajram Kosumi	Prime Minister	2001
Kosovo	Bajram Rexhepi	Prime Minister	2000
Lithuania	Dalia Grybauskaitė	President	1994
Lithuania	Gediminas Kirkilas	President	2002, 1993
Lithuania	Arturas Paulauskas	President	1992
Luxembourg	Jacques Santer	Prime Minister	1973
Macedonia	Nikola Gruevski	Prime Minister	2000
Macedonia	Boris Trajkovski	President	1996
Macedonia	Ljubco Georgievski	Prime Minister	1996
Malta	Joseph Muscat	Prime Minister	1984
Malta	Edward Fenech Adami	President	1974, 1975
Malta	Guido De Marco	President	1973
Malta	Lawrence Gonzi	Prime Minister	1990
Malta	Ugo Mifsud Bonnici	President	1971
Malta	Dominic Mintoff	Prime Minister	1965
Moldova	Nicolae Timofti	President	2005
Moldova	Petru Lucinschi	President	1995
Montenegro	Igor Lukšić	Prime Minister	1999
The Netherlands	Jan Peter Balkenende	Prime Minister	1985
The Netherlands	Willem Kok	Prime Minister	1978
The Netherlands	Joop den Uyl	Prime Minister	1953, 1979
Norway	Erna Solberg	Prime Minister	1996
Norway	Jens Stoltenberg	Prime Minister	1988
Norway	Thorbjorn Jagland	Prime Minister	1982
Norway	Kjell Magne Bondevik	Prime Minister	1971
Norway	Jan P. Syse	Prime Minister	1978
Norway	Kare Willoch	Prime Minister	1979
Poland	Beata Szydło	Prime Minister	2004
Poland	Bronislaw Komorowski	President	2006
Poland	Donald Tusk	Prime Minister	1995
Poland	Hanna Suchocka	Prime Minister	1988
Poland	Mieczysław Rakowski	Prime Minister	1978
Poland	Kazimierz Marcinkiewicz	Prime Minister	2000
Poland	Aleksander Kwasniewski	President	1994
Portugal	Aníbal Cavaco Silva	President	1978
Portugal	Jorge Sampaio	President	1965
Portugal	Mario Alberto Soares	President	1976
Portugal	António Guterres	Prime Minister	1978
Portugal	Francisco Pinto Balsemao	Prime Minister	1965
Romania	Victor Ciorbea	Prime Minister	1995
Slovenia	Borut Pahor	Prime Minister	1991
Slovenia	Janez Drnovšek	President	1988
Spain	Eduardo Madina	Deputy	
Sweden	Fredrik Reinfeldt	Prime Minister	2002
Sweden	Carl Bildt	Prime Minister	1973
Switzerland	Moritz Leuenberger	President	1993
Switzerland	Andri Silberschmidt	National Councilor	2019
Turkey	Abdullah Gul	President	1995
Turkey	Suleyman Demirel	President	1957
Ukraine	Leonid Kuchma	President	1994
Ukraine	Leonid Kravchuk	President	
United Kingdom	Theresa May	Prime Minister	2004
United Kingdom	Gordon Brown	Prime Minister	1992, 1984
United Kingdom	Tony Blair	Prime Minister	1992, 1986
United Kingdom	Margaret Thatcher	Prime Minister	1967
United Kingdom	Edward Heath	Prime Minister	1953
United Kingdom	Humza Yousaf	First Minister of Scotland	2008

=== North Africa, Near East, South Asia and Central Asia ===
Country	Name	Highest Position	Year Participated
Afghanistan	Hamid Karzai	President	1987
Bangladesh	Fakhruddin Ahmed	Chief Advisor	1977
Bhutan	Jigme Thinley	Prime Minister	1987
Bhutan	Khandu Wangchuk	Prime Minister	1993
Egypt	Anwar Sadat	President	1968
Egypt	Ahmed Nazif	Prime Minister	1990
Egypt	Ahmad Fuad Mohieddin	Prime Minister	1977
India	Pratibha Patil	President	1999, 1986
India	Narendra Modi	Prime Minister	1993
India	Atal Bihari Vajpayee	Prime Minister	1960
India	Indira Gandhi	Prime Minister	1961
India	Morarji Desai	Prime Minister	1962
India	Ayesha Rubina	Social Worker	2012
India	Natarajan Velayutham	Advocate & Social Worker	2024
India	Arun Daniel Yellamaty	Founder Youngistaan Foundation	2022
India	Berly Thomas	Media Personality and Blogger	2013
Israel	Moshe Katzav	President	1980
Israel	Ehud Olmert	Prime Minister	1978
Jordan	Adnan Badran	Prime Minister	1977
Jordan	Faisal al-Fayez	Prime Minister	1988
Jordan	Abdelsalam al-Majali	Prime Minister	1969
Kyrgyzstan	Kurmanbek Bakiyev	President	2004
Lebanon	Amin Gemayel	President	1979, 1972
Lebanon	Elias Sarkis	President	1971
Lebanon	Zaven Kouyoumdjian	Media Personality	2006
Morocco	Azzedine Laraki	Prime Minister	1986
Morocco	Maati Bouabid	Prime Minister	1965, 1961
Nepal	Krishna Prasad Bhattarai	Prime Minister	1993
Nepal	Sher Bahadur Deuba	Prime Minister	
Pakistan	Ghulam Ishaq Khan	President	1949
Pakistan	Sheikh Mujibur Rahman	Future Prime Minister of Bangladesh	1952
Sri Lanka	Mahinda Rajapakse	President	1989
Sri Lanka	Ranil Wickremesinghe	Prime Minister	1988, 1981
Sri Lanka	Ratnasiri Wickremanayake	Prime Minister	1975
Sri Lanka	Ranasinghe Premadasa	President	1966
Tunisia	Mohamed Mzali	Prime Minister	1964
Tunisia	Emna Mizouni	Wikipedia Of The Year 2019	2019
Qatar	Hamad bin Jassim bin Jaber Al Thani	Prime Minister	1989
Yemen	Mohamed Qubaty	Minister, Ambassador & Media Personality	2001

=== Sub-Saharan Africa ===
Country	Name	Highest Position	Year Participated
Benin	Nicephore Soglo	President	1997
Botswana	Festus G. Mogae	President	1976
Botswana	Quett Masire	President	1975
Burkina Faso	Roch Marc Christian Kaboré	President	1999, 1986
Central African Republic	Andre-Dieudonne Kolingba	President	1966
Chad	Youssouf Saleh Abbas	Prime Minister	1999
Chad	Nagoum Yamassoum	Prime Minister	1992
Côte d'Ivoire	Laurent Gbagbo	President	1993
Côte d'Ivoire	Daniel Kablan Duncan	Prime Minister	1974
Ghana	John Kufuor	President	Late 1960s
Guinea	Alpha Condé	President	1962
Guinea	Lamine Sidimé	Prime Minister	1992
Kenya	Mwai Kibaki	President	1999
Kenya	Daniel arap Moi	President	1969
Lesotho	'Mamohato Seeiso	Queen	1993
Madagascar	Didier Ratsiraka	President	1973
Madagascar	Philibert Tsiranana	President	1964
Malawi	Joyce Banda	President	1989
Malawi	Bakili Muluzi	President	1980
Mali	Alpha Oumar Konaré	President	1978
Mauritius	Anerood Jugnauth	President	1981
Mauritius	Navinchandra Ramgoolam	Prime Minister	1986
Mauritius	Karl Offmann	President	1985
Mauritius	Veerasamy Ringadoo	Governor General	1982
Mauritius	Dayendranath Burrenchobay	Governor General	1969
Mozambique	Armando Guebuza	President	1987
Mozambique	Pascoal Mocumbi	Prime Minister	1986
Namibia	Nahas Angula	Prime Minister	1996
Niger	Seyni Oumarou	Prime Minister	1990
Niger	Hama Amadou	Prime Minister	1986
Nigeria	Alex Ifeanyichukwu Ekwueme	Vice President	
Rwanda	Sylvestre Nsanzimana	Prime Minister	1986
South Africa	Frederik Willem de Klerk	President	1976
Senegal	Mame Madior Boye	Prime Minister	1975
Seychelles	France-Albert René	President	1967
Swaziland	Obed Dlamini	Prime Minister	1986
Tanzania	Julius Nyerere	President	1960
Togo	Faure Gnassingbé	President	2001
Togo	Yawovi Agboyibo	Prime Minister	1997
Togo	Edem Kodjo	Prime Minister	1972
Togo	Joseph Kokou Koffigoh	Prime Minister	1990
Uganda	Amama Mbabazi	Prime Minister	2011
Zambia	Kebby Musokotwane	Prime Minister	1979
Zimbabwe	Morgan Tsvangirai	Prime Minister	1989

=== Western Hemisphere ===
Country	Name	Highest Position	Year Participated
Argentina	Fernando de la Rúa	President	1966
Argentina	Raúl Alfonsín	President	1981
Barbados	Owen Arthur	Prime Minister	1988
Barbados	Lloyd Erskine Sandiford	Prime Minister	1975
Barbados	Tom Adams	Prime Minister	1973
Belize	Said Musa	Prime Minister	1995
Bolivia	Carlos Mesa	President	2002, 1979
Brazil	Dilma Rousseff	President	1992
Brazil	José Sarney	President	1964
Canada	Edward Schreyer	Governor General	1978
Chile	Ricardo Lagos	President	1988
Chile	Marco Antonio Díaz	Mayor	2021
Colombia	Álvaro Uribe	President	1998
Colombia	Ernesto Samper	President	1985
Colombia	César Gaviria	President	1982
Colombia	Belisario Betancur	President	1952
Colombia	Julio César Turbay Ayala	President	1977
Costa Rica	Óscar Arias	Prime Minister	1971
Dominica	Nicholas Liverpool	President	1985
Dominica	Eugenia Charles	Prime Minister	1995
Dominica	Patrick John	Prime Minister	1979
Dominican Republic	Danilo Medina	President	1991
Dominican Republic	Hipólito Mejía	President	1995
Dominican Republic	Salvador Jorge Blanco	President	1979
Ecuador	Gustavo Noboa	President	1960
Ecuador	Jamil Mahuad	President	1985
Ecuador	Rosalía Arteaga	President	1993
Ecuador	Rodrigo Borja	President	1962
El Salvador	Armando Calderón Sol	President	1986
El Salvador	Alfredo Cristiani	President	1986
Grenada	Paul Scoon	Governor General	1972
Guyana	Hamilton Green	Prime Minister	1967
Guyana	Ptolemy Reid	President	1966
Guatemala	Vinicio Cerezo	President	1976
Guatemala	Alfonso Portillo	President	1992
Guatemala	Álvaro Arzú	President	1982
Guatemala	Ramiro de León Carpio	President	1988
Haiti	Jacques-Édouard Alexis	Prime Minister	1983
Haiti	Ertha Pascal-Trouillot	President	1980
Haiti	Leslie Manigat	President	1959
Honduras	Ricardo Maduro	President	1986
Honduras	Carlos Roberto Reina	President	1993
Honduras	Rafael Leonardo Callejas	President	1986
Honduras	José Azcona del Hoyo	President	1985
Jamaica	Portia Simpson-Miller	Prime Minister	1981
Jamaica	Howard Cooke	Governor General	1981
Jamaica	Donald Sangster	Prime Minister	1960
Mexico	Felipe Calderón	President	1992
Paraguay	Nicanor Duarte	President	1989
Peru	Jorge Del Castillo	Prime Minister	1988
Peru	Beatriz Merino	Prime Minister	1997
Peru	Vladimiro Montesinos	Intelligence chief	1976
Saint Kitts and Nevis	Denzil Douglas	Prime Minister	1990
Saint Kitts and Nevis	Simeon Daniel	Premier	1980
Saint Kitts and Nevis	Lee Moore	Premier	1972
Saint Lucia	Stephenson King	Prime Minister	1985
Saint Vincent and the Grenadines	James Fitz-Allen Mitchell	Prime Minister	1973
Suriname	Ronald Venetiaan	President	1981
Suriname	Ramsewak Shankar	President	1978
Trinidad and Tobago	George Richards	President	1986
Trinidad and Tobago	Kamla Persad-Bissessar	Prime Minister	1998
Trinidad and Tobago	Patrick Manning	Prime Minister	1988
Trinidad and Tobago	Basdeo Panday	Prime Minister	1978
Trinidad and Tobago	Michael Williams	President	1988
Uruguay	Tabaré Vázquez	President	1993
Uruguay	Washington Beltrán	President	1976
Uruguay	Julio María Sanguinetti	President	1984
Uruguay	Luis Alberto Lacalle	President	1968
Venezuela	Rafael Caldera	President	1962
Venezuela	Luis Herrera Campins	President	1967

== Agencies involved ==
The IVLP functions through a cooperative agreement with several National Program Agencies and Global Ties U.S., comprising organizations in 45 states, that arrange the itineraries for IVLP exchange participants.

- CRDF Global
- Cultural Vistas
- FHI360
- Institute of International Education
- Meridian International Center
- Mississippi Consortium for International Development
- American Councils for International Education
- World Learning
