= WorldLink =

WorldLink may refer to:

- World Link, placement organisation
- WorldLink Communications, Internet service provider in Nepal
