= YFU =

YFU may refer to:

- Youth For Understanding, a non-profit organisation
- A US Navy hull classification symbol: Harbor utility craft (YFU)
