= Carnegie Hall Cultural Exchange =

The Carnegie Hall Cultural Exchange is a cultural exchange program sponsored in part by the United States State Department's Bureau of Educational and Cultural Affairs and administered by Carnegie Hall The program brings New York City students together with students in foreign countries, where the students (between grades 9 and 12) collaborate in various projects to make music. The program uses telecast to bring students together in interactive performances and discussions.

Previous seasons have featured exchanges with Mexico, India, and Turkey. The 2010–2011 season featured "The Music of Mexico". The program includes two concerts using the interactive telecast method, professional development workshops for teachers, a "Student Ambassador Program" where one student from each classroom participates in a workshop, curriculum resources for participating classrooms, and an online social community.

== See also ==
- United States Cultural Exchange Programs
