= World Link =

Placement organization

World Link Inc.
- Founded: 2002
- Founders: Curtis and Lana Stutzman
- Type: Nonprofit
- Legal status: Active
- Purpose: Leadership, Multi-culturism, Diplomacy
- Headquarters: Kalona, Iowa
- Location: USA
- Region served: Determined by the U.S. Congress
- Fields: Education & Foreign Exchange
- Affiliations: KL-YES & FLEX program
- Students: 4000+
- Website: worldlinkinc.org

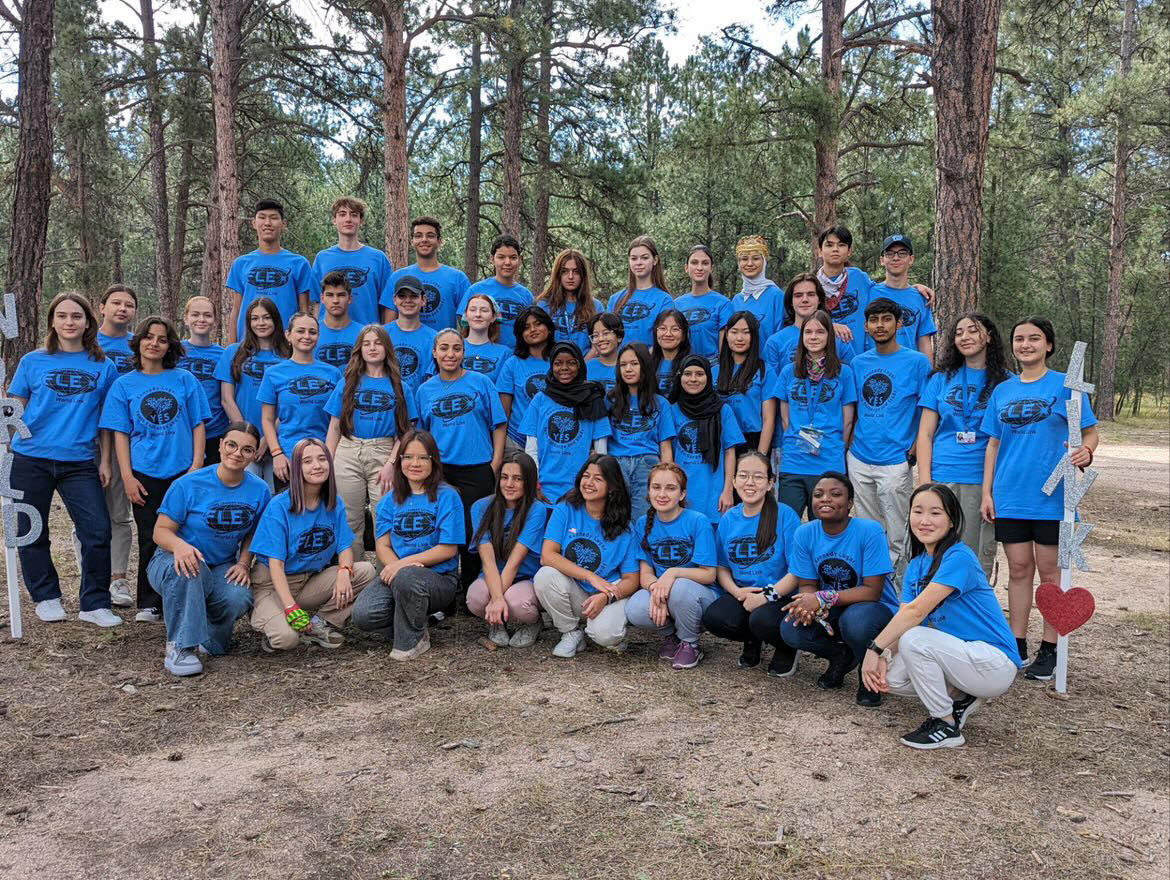
Picture of World Link students during 2023 arrival orientation.

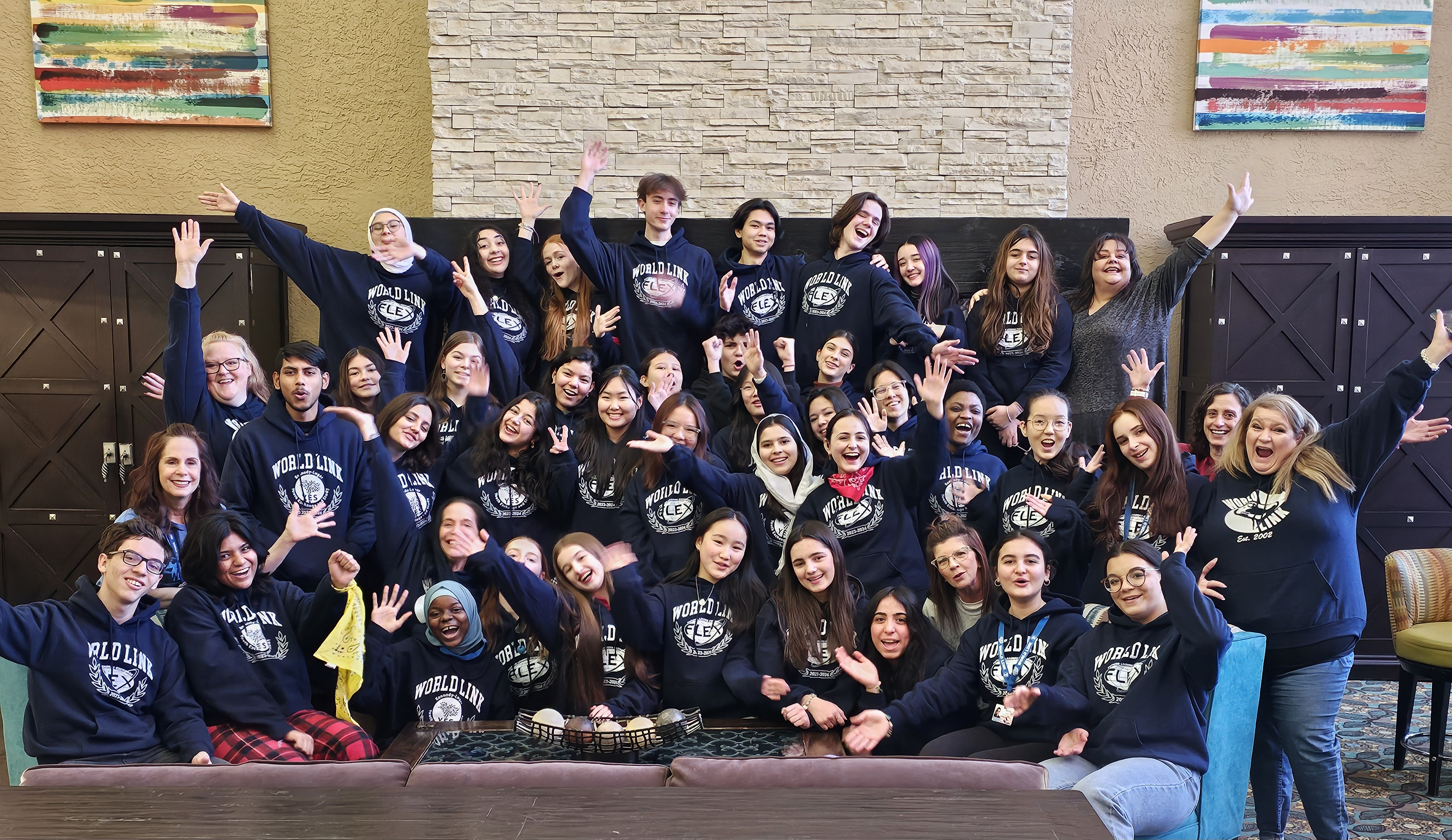
World Link exchange students at mid-term orientation in Santa Fe, New Mexico.

World Link is a non-profit international student exchange organization that develops youth leadership in students around the world. It is funded by the U.S. Department of State and is headquartered in Kalona, Iowa. It serves as a placement organization for Kennedy Lugar Youth Exchange and Study Program & FLEX program and administers participant activities.

== History ==
World Link was founded in 2002, with a merger of staff from international program departments from the National FFA Organization and the Russian Rural Youth Union.

== Programs ==
=== Grant programs ===
World Link currently administers several grant programs sponsored by the Bureau of Educational and Cultural Affairs, United States Department of State including the Kennedy-Lugar Youth Exchange and Study (KL-YES) and the Future Leaders Exchange (FLEX) program.
