= CEWS =

CEWS may refer to:

- Canada Emergency Wage Subsidy, a temporary Canadian business assistance program during the COVID-19 pandemic
- Continental Early Warning System, a conflict early warning system of the African Union

== See also ==
- CEW (disambiguation)
