= Benjamin Gilman =

American politician (1922–2016)

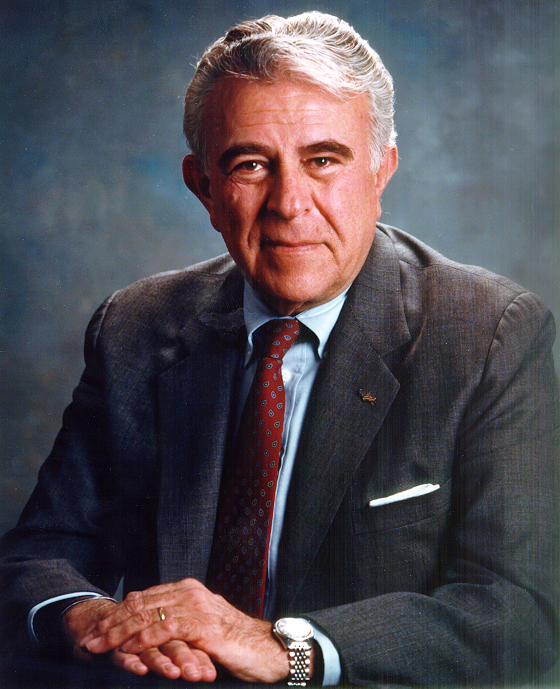

Chair of the House International Relations Committee
- In office January 3, 1995 – January 3, 2001
- Preceded by: Lee H. Hamilton
- Succeeded by: Henry Hyde

Member of the U.S. House of Representatives from New York
- In office January 3, 1973 – January 3, 2003
- Preceded by: Ogden Reid
- Succeeded by: John E. Sweeney
- Constituency: 26th district (1973–1983); 22nd district (1983–1993); 20th district (1993–2003)

Member of the New York State Assembly from the 95th district
- In office January 1, 1967 – December 31, 1972
- Preceded by: Benjamin Altman
- Succeeded by: Eugene Levy

Personal details
- Born: Benjamin Arthur Gilman; December 6, 1922 Poughkeepsie, New York, U.S.
- Died: December 17, 2016 (aged 94) Wappingers Falls, New York, U.S.
- Party: Republican
- Spouse(s): Jane Prizant (m. 1954; div. 1978) Rita Kelhofer (m. 1984; div. 1997) Georgia Tingus (m. 1997)
- Children: 5 (With Prizant)
- Education: University of Pennsylvania (BS); New York Law School (LLB)
- Benjamin Gilman's voice Gilman, as chair of the House International Relations Committee, on legislation allowing former Warsaw Pact nations to join NATO; Recorded July 23, 1996

Benjamin Arthur Gilman (December 6, 1922 – December 17, 2016) was an American politician and Republican member of the United States House of Representatives from Middletown, New York, from January 3, 1973, to January 3, 2003.

== Early life ==
Gilman was born in Poughkeepsie, New York, the son of Esther (Gold) and Harry Gilman. His parents were Austrian Jewish immigrants. Gilman graduated from Middletown High School in Middletown, New York, in 1941 and received a B.S. from the Wharton School of Business at the University of Pennsylvania in 1946. He also earned an LL.B. from New York Law School. He was a brother of Zeta Beta Tau. Gilman served in the United States Army Air Corps from 1942 until 1945 during World War II. During that conflict, he flew 35 missions over Japan, earning the Distinguished Flying Cross and the Air Medal with Oak Leaf Clusters.

== Early career ==
After graduating New York Law School in 1950, Gilman served as assistant attorney general to the Attorney General of New York from 1953 until 1955. Following this, he practiced law privately in his hometown of Middletown, New York.

Gilman was a member of the New York State Assembly from 1967 to 1972, sitting in the 177th, 178th and 179th New York State Legislatures. He was a member of the New York State Southeastern Water Commission.

== Tenure ==
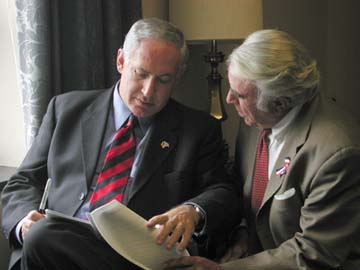
Gilman with Benjamin Netanyahu

Gilman first won election to Congress in 1972 to represent New York's 26th congressional district. New York's congressional districts had been redrawn in reapportionment, and in the general election Gilman defeated incumbent congressman John G. Dow, a Democrat who had been serving in New York's 27th congressional district, (which included most of the territory and population of the new 26th district). Gilman subsequently served in Congress from January 3, 1973, until January 3, 2003. During his time in Congress, he was chair of the House Committee on International Relations (104th through 106th Congresses).

He was widely regarded as a moderate Republican in the mold of New York's Nelson Rockefeller He was active on foreign affairs issues, serving as a Congressional delegate to the United Nations, serving under Ambassador Jeane Kirkpatrick in 1981. He was a Member of the Ukraine Famine Commission, a member of the U.S., European, Canadian and Mexican Interparliamentary conferences, and a Congressional Advisor to the U.N. Law of the Sea Conference. He was co-chair of the Committee on Irish Affairs and participated on the International Task Force on Narcotics. He was a recipient of the Secretary's Distinguished Service Award, a gold medal and certificate which represents the highest civilian honor bestowed by the State Department.

Throughout his years in Congress, he was a member of the House Post Office and Civil Service Committee, the name of which evolved into the Government Reform and Oversight Committee in the 1990s. As a co-founder of the House Select Committee on Narcotics, he served as a senior member on that Committee (1977–1989) and continued to serve as a member until the committee was abolished in 1993.

During the 1970s, Gilman became closely identified with the issue of Prisoners of War and Missing in Action in Southeast Asia. He served on the Select Congressional Committee on that problem, and was one of only two Members of Congress to vote in opposition to closing the book on the POW/MIA situation.

He also became involved with world hunger in the 1970s, authoring the legislation creating a presidential Commission Against Hunger, to which he was subsequently appointed by President Jimmy Carter.

As the chair of the House Committee on Foreign Affairs, from 1995 to 2002, Congressman Gilman consistently advocated stronger ties with India , as a counterweight against Chinese influence in the region, particularly in Pakistan. During the Kargil War against Pakistan, he urged American lawmakers to pressure the Pakistani government to withdraw from the conflict, stating that he held Pakistan solely responsible for the conflict. During a Hearing on the Status of Negotiations between China and Tibet in April 2000, Congressman Gilman said, “The Tibetan cause enjoys the global support that it does because it is a courageous attempt by a Nation and a people who are trying to regain what is rightfully theirs by throwing off the repression of colonization. It is in the interest of international stability to have Tibet once again serve as it had for 2000 years as a buffer zone strategically placed between India and China.” In recognition of his contribution to furthering U.S. ties with India, he was awarded that country's second-highest civilian honor, the Padma Vibhushan, in 2001. He is one of only 12 foreigners, and one of only 3 Americans not of Indian origin, to have received the award. In his later years in Congress, Gilman was a vociferous and frequent critic of President Bill Clinton, particularly on matters related to American foreign policy.

Congressman Gilman helped gain passage of the International Academic Opportunity Act of 2000, establishing exchange programs for American students to study abroad. Named after Gilman is the Benjamin A. Gilman International Scholarship, a program for Pell Grant eligible American college students to study or intern abroad administered by the United States Department of State.

Study abroad is a special experience for every student who participates. Living and learning in a vastly different environment of another nation not only exposes our students to alternate views, but also adds an enriching social and cultural experience. It also provides our students with the opportunity to return home with a deeper understanding of their place in the world, encouraging them to be a contributor, rather than a spectator in the international community.

— Benjamin A. Gilman

Congressman Gilman retired from Congress in 2003 after New York's 20th congressional district, which he had represented, was broken up and dispersed among the 17th, 18th, 19th and 22nd Congressional Districts in the redistricting that followed the 2000 census and reapportionment. At the time of his retirement, Gilman was the oldest sitting representative in the U.S. House (in all of Congress, only Senators Strom Thurmond and Robert Byrd were older). He was the senior Republican representing New York, and the second-most senior Member from New York overall, behind only Charles B. Rangel. In 2003, following his retirement from Congress, the Dalai Lama bestowed upon Congressman Gilman the International Campaign for Tibet's Light of Truth Award.

On March 28, 2008, Gilman participated in the ribbon cutting ceremony for the Gilman Center for International Education in his hometown of Middletown, New York, on the campus of SUNY Orange, also known as Orange County Community College. This modern new facility for international studies is expected to attract students from throughout the world, and houses Gilman's public papers from throughout his 36 years in elective office. Various photographs and memorabilia from throughout his career are on display.

On Jun 14, 2011, Gilman was awarded the Top Honor Prize, and recognized by the World Peace Prize Awarding Council for being a lifelong champion of human rights: fighting world hunger, narcotic abuse and trafficking.

== Personal life ==
Gilman was married three times: to the former Jane Prizant (1927–2000), a lawyer and daughter of a well-known actor of the Yiddish theater, Hyman Prizant, to Rita Kelhofer, and to Georgia Tingus. His children from the first marriage were Jonathan Gilman, Susan Gilman-Harts, Harrison Gilman, David Gilman (deceased) and Ellen Gilman (deceased). After his retirement, he continued to live in Middletown, his home in the Hudson Valley district that he represented.

Gilman was a 33 Degree Scottish Rite Freemason. A local Scottish Rite organization in Middletown, New York, the Benjamin Gilman Lodge of Perfection, is named in his honor and memory.

== Death ==
Gilman died on December 17, 2016, at the Castle Point Veteran's Hospital in Fishkill (town), New York from surgical complications, eleven days after his 94th birthday. He was married three times and had five children.

== See also ==
- List of Jewish members of the United States Congress

New York State Assembly
Preceded by Benjamin Altman	Member of the New York State Assembly from the 95th district 1967–1972	Succeeded by Eugene Levy
U.S. House of Representatives
Preceded by Ogden Reid	Member of the U.S. House of Representatives from New York's 26th congressional district 1973–1983	Succeeded by David O'Brien Martin
Preceded by Jonathan B. Bingham	Member of the U.S. House of Representatives from New York's 22nd congressional district 1983–1993	Succeeded by Gerald Solomon
Preceded by Nita Lowey	Member of the U.S. House of Representatives from New York's 20th congressional district 1993–2003	Succeeded by John E. Sweeney
Political offices
Preceded by Gene Taylor; Missouri	Ranking Member of House Post Office and Civil Service Committee; 1989–1993	Succeeded by John T. Myers; Indiana
Preceded by William Broomfield; Michigan	Ranking Member of the House International Relations Committee; 1993–1995	Succeeded by Lee H. Hamilton; Indiana
Preceded by Lee H. Hamilton; Indiana	Chairman of the House International Relations Committee; 1995–2001	Succeeded by Henry Hyde; Illinois
Honorary titles
Preceded by Sidney R. Yates	Oldest member of the U.S. House of Representatives; 1999–2003	Succeeded by Ralph Hall
