= Benjamin A. Gilman International Scholarship =

American scholarship program

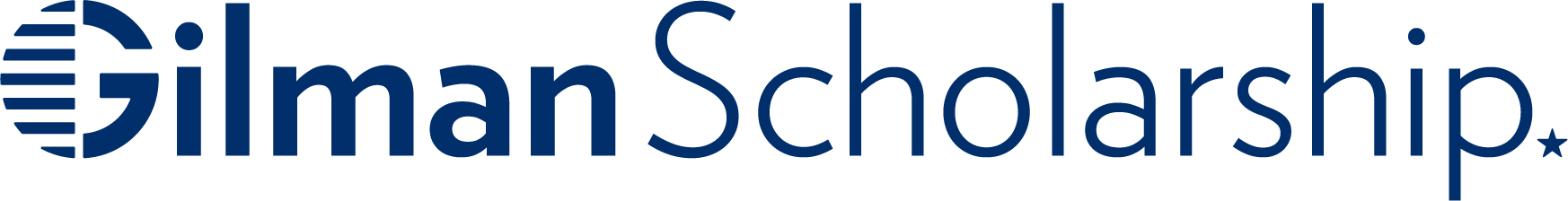
- Awarded for: U.S. undergraduate students that have received a Pell Grant and intend to study abroad
- Sponsored by: Bureau of Educational and Cultural Affairs
- Established: 2000
- Website: https://www.gilmanscholarship.org/

The Benjamin A. Gilman International Scholarship is a United States Cultural Exchange Program. Named after the late Congressman Benjamin Gilman, former chair of the House Foreign Affairs Committee, the program is administered by the United States Department of State and supported in its implementation by the Institute of International Education. It provides scholarships to U.S. undergraduates with financial need for study abroad, including students from diverse backgrounds and students going to non-traditional study abroad destinations. Established under the International Academic Opportunity Act of 2000, Gilman Scholarships provide up to $5,000 for American students to pursue overseas study for college credit.

== Program ==
The program is a minimum of length of two weeks for community college students and three weeks for students at four-year institutions. The scholarship program is open to all U.S. citizen undergraduates, in good academic standing who have received a Pell Grant and meet the following criteria. Students studying critical need languages are eligible for up to $3,000 in additional funding as part of the Gilman Critical Need Language Supplement program. Those critical need languages include Arabic (all dialects), Chinese (all dialects), Bahasa Indonesia, Japanese, Turkic (Azerbaijani, Kazakh, Kyrgyz, Turkish, Turkmen, Uzbek), Persian (including Dari, Kurdish, Pashto, Tajiki), Indic (Hindi, Urdu, Nepali, Sinhala, Bengali, Punjabi, Marathi, Gujarati, Sindhi), Korean, Russian, Swahili, and Portuguese. The program awards over 2,800 scholarships annually.
