= Ayesha Rubina =

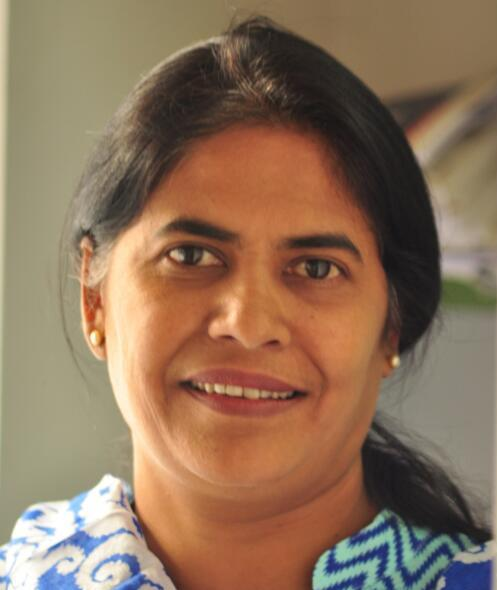
- Born: 3 May 1969 (age 57); Hyderabad, India
- Education: Osmani University
- Occupation: politician

Ayesha Rubina (عائشہ روبینہ; born 1969) is a corporator of Greater Hyderabad Municipal Corporation (GHMC), educationist, social entrepreneur, social worker and former co-opted member of (GHMC). She is noted for being instrumental in planning a first-of-its-kind park for special needs people in India. She provides special education to children with special needs. She actively takes part in social debates and local issues. She is based in Hyderabad, India.

== Education ==
Ayesha did her schooling from Holy Mary Girls High School and earned three degrees from Osmania University. She has master's degree in social work, and post graduate diploma in early childhood education and teaching from Osmania University. She had been awarded gold medal for scoring highest marks in M.A. English from Osmania University.

== Social & volunteer work ==
She is a professional social worker with a Master of Social Work. In recognition of her services in the field of education and social work, Ayesha was nominated to Greater Hyderabad Municipal Corporation as a co-opted member. In this role, she has contributed by laying out the first ward development plan, played a prominent role in planning a park for special needs persons, and initiated livelihood training for over 8,000 youth.

Ayesha has helped set up 10 schools for the underprivileged that cater to the educational needs of more than 4500 children. She also runs a school for kids with special needs. She has been in the top eight of The Times of India's "Lead India" initiative and a participant of the prestigious International Visitor Leadership Program (IVLP) of the U.S. Department of State. As an Advisory Committee member, she is associated with a Center for Social Sciences, a network of people and organizations engaged in community based services through education and social services.

== Greens Special School ==
It is one of its kind schools that give education to children with special needs. This school does not provide education to special kids. It offers medical therapies, and aims to rehabilitate & integrate these children into the mainstream. The special school is Ayesha's pet project, and it is run by Ayesha Education Society.

== Views on Girl’s Education ==
Being an activist who works in the area of girls' education, Ayesha believes that the role of economically independent women has become even more challenging nowadays. She criticizes modern society for merry-making and feeling comfortable when a woman goes out to earn, but expecting her to first deliver her 'traditional' duties efficiently. She also worked towards establishing e-libraries in the city. She said that the number of students in Hyderabad's Old City area is increasing day-by-day, and education has become a priority. Therefore, libraries are need there.

== Political affiliation ==
Ayesha is a known figure in Hyderabad's political circles for her social work and activism for public welfare. In April 2014, a press report quoted All India Majlis-e-Ittehad-ul Muslimeen (AIMIM) supremo Asaduddin Owaisi as saying that his party is forming its Shoba-e-Khwateen (Women's Wing). The same report noted that Ayesha was tipped to be joint convener of Women's Wing.

== International conferences/programs ==
Asia-Pacific Cities Summit: In 2013, Ayesha represented the Mayor of Hyderabad in the Asia-Pacific Cities Summit held in Taiwan where she presented a paper on "Trans-City Business Coalitions" and "Local Informal Economies".

International Visitor Leadership Program: She is an alumnus of U.S. Department of State's premier leadership exchange programme - International Visitor Leadership Program (IVLP).

== Leadership/management ==
| Institution | Role |
|---|---|
| Greens Special School | Managing Trustee |
| Greater Hyderabad Municipal Corporation | Co-opted Member |
| Genesis High School | Managing director |
| Bharathi Vidyalaya | Founder |
| Center for Social Sciences | Advisory committee member |
| OSE Group of Schools | Managing director (honorary) |
| Special Olympics | Trustee |
| Indian Council for Child Welfare (ICCW) | Member and Ex-coordinator, AP |
| A.P. Welfare Association for Mentally Challenged | Executive Committee Member |
| Sarojni Naidu Vanita Mahavidyalaya Alumni Association | President |
| Holy Mary Girls High School Alumni Association | President |

== Awards and recognition ==
1. Pearl of Hyderabad by JCI Hyderabad: Ayesha was awarded the title 'Pearl of Hyderabad' by local chapter of Junior Chamber International (JCI), a non-political and non-sectarian youth service organization.

2. IVLP (International Visitor Leadership Program) - U.S. Department of State: An alumnus of U.S. Department of State's International Visitor Leadership Program (IVLP). Ayesha represented India and was one among the 19 participants from various countries of the world. She visited 4 states- Washington D.C, Florida, Texas & California.

3. Lead India by The Times of India: Represented the city of Hyderabad in the Times of India's 'Lead India'- a nationwide talent hunt for the next generation of political leaders for India. Finished in the Final 8 of the nationwide competition.

4. Young Achiever Award by Rotary Club, Hyderabad.

5. Gold Medalist in M.A. (Masters in English) at Sarojni Naidu Vanitha Mahavidyalaya.

== See also ==
- Mohammad Majid Hussain
- Greater Hyderabad Municipal Corporation
- Osmania University
