= Rachel Andresen =

Founder of Youth For Understanding (born 1907)

- Born: April 8, 1907; Deerfield, Michigan, U.S.
- Died: November 3, 1988 (aged 81); South Lyon, Michigan, U.S.
- Known for: founding Youth for Understanding, volunteerism

Rachel Andresen (April 8, 1907 – November 3, 1988) was an American social worker and founder of Youth For Understanding (YFU), a non-profit organization dedicated to international exchanges of high-school students.

== Background ==
Andresen was born in Deerfield, Michigan on April 8, 1907. She was the daughter of Reverend Earl Rice, a Methodist minister, and Josephine Mills. Her parents motivated their seven children to be highly focused and productive, particularly with education. By the time Andresen was fourteen, she had read and consumed the Harvard Classics and the entire works of Shakespeare, which her father encouraged her to read.

She was very lively in high school and had participated in sports, drama, and music; she was also an accomplished pianist. Her nickname at Adrian High School was "Rollicking Rachel". She also did the unthinkable: she bobbed her hair, much to the dismay of her conservative parents. She graduated top of her class when she was sixteen years old. It was also at this time that she met her future husband, Henry Rose. Andresen attended the Detroit Conservatory of Music and received a BFA in music.

== Marriage ==
After Andresen and Rose were married, she helped to support their income by giving piano lessons while he attended the University of Michigan. They were one of the few married couples on campus. They had three children and Rose was beginning to establish himself in engineering when tragedy struck.

Rose died in the encephalitis epidemic of 1934, at the height of the Great Depression. Andresen was left with three children to raise alone and not many people opted to spend money on piano lessons at that time. Andresen decided that the only way she could make it was by returning to school. She then got a Bachelor's in Education from Wayne State University followed by an Master's in Social Work from the University of Michigan in 1943.

== YWCA ==
Andresen began her work with the YWCA in Detroit and also became the director of Camp Talahi. During the rest of the year she did a lot of inner-city work in Detroit.

In 1942 she purchased a large farm house on 82 acres near South Lyon, Michigan; this would become known as Pinebrook. It was transformed into both a summer camp and a hostel for international travelers year around.

Andresen met her second husband, Arvid Andresen, a Danish landscape architect, who was on excursion and stayed at the hostel.

On a late-1940s trip to Europe she pondered how to heal the damage done by World War II. Andresen became involved with the Michigan Council of Churches. By the end of World War II, the Council was responsible for helping to re-build Europe by providing Michigan cattle and humanitarian assistance. Andresen was approached by the Ann Arbor Rotarians and the State Department to supervise an exchange student program in 1952 in order to help bridge the rift of post-war hatred.

This began with a handful of German students who would live in Michigan for one year. The Army of the Occupation chose 75 students for the program. Andresen was apprehensive of how well the concept of American families taking in students of a former enemy would be received. She managed to place all the students, many of whom barely had enough clothes to fit into one small suitcase. At the beginning of the school year they stayed at Pinebrook before they went to their host families to attend high schools in various communities in Michigan. At the end of their academic year they stayed at Pinebrook again, speaking English and having been enveloped by American culture.

== Youth for Understanding ==
On the day the students left for home, hundreds of people – host families, teachers, and students from their schools – turned out to say goodbye. The students left with suitcases of new clothes, lifelong friends, and understanding. Andresen realized it was impossible to hate someone (or even a country) one actually knows and understands on a family and community level. This was the basic concept of Youth For Understanding (YFU). Andresen was YFU's founder and first executive director.

The YFU program began at a very grassroots level, and evolved and snowballed into a giant organization in the 25 years Andresen was at the helm. What began with a small group of students from one country ended up as a vast and global network of peace and understanding. It became the world's largest non-profit youth exchange program by the time of her retirement in 1973. She called the participants student ambassadors.

In 1972, she was honored by President Nixon at a gathering celebrating the work of Youth for Understanding. The following year, she was nominated for the Nobel Peace Prize. In 1974 she was appointed to the Commission for Volunteers in Michigan.

She championed volunteerism, local politics and empowerment programs but she also relished having more time with her family and with her piano and her gardening. She continued to travel extensively abroad and in the states.

== Death and posthumous honours ==
Andresen died on November 3, 1988, in South Lyon, Michigan, aged 81.

In 1991, she was inducted into the Michigan Women's Hall of Fame.
