= American Music Abroad =

US State Department cultural exchange program

The Rhythm Road: American Music Abroad is a $1.5 million per annum cultural exchange program for musicians sponsored in part by the United States State Department's Bureau of Educational and Cultural Affairs. This program is in partnership with Jazz at Lincoln Center. It encourages American musicians to reach out to areas in the world where American society and culture are not particularly liked. Since its launch in 2005, 150 musicians have participated in the Rhythm Road, travelling to over 100 countries. The State Department draws a direct link between this program and the Jazz Ambassadors program during the Cold War era, when Jazz legends such as Dizzy Gillespie, Louis Armstrong and Dave Brubeck went on global tours on behalf of the State Department.

In addition to performing for foreign audiences, musicians who participate in this program lead workshops and classes to educate locals in their instrument.
