= United States cultural exchange programs =

US government programs

United States cultural exchange programs, particularly those programs with ties to the Bureau of Educational and Cultural Affairs (ECA) of the United States Department of State, seek to develop cultural understanding between United States citizens and citizens of other countries. Exchange programs do not necessarily exchange one individual for another individual of another country; rather, "exchange" refers to the exchange of cultural understanding created when an individual goes to another country. These programs can be regarded as a form of cultural diplomacy within the spectrum of public diplomacy.

Exchange programs played a vital role in official and unofficial relations between the Soviet Union and the United States during the Cold War. Examples of cultural exchange programs include student exchanges, sports exchanges, and scholarly or professional exchanges, among many others. While many exchange programs are funded by the government, many others are private-sector organizations, either non-profit or for-profit.

== History of US Cultural Program ==
One of the earliest cultural exchanges to be considered part of U.S. Public Diplomacy occurred when Nelson Rockefeller, named coordinator of Commercial and Cultural Affairs for the American Republics, encouraged journalists from Latin America to visit the United States in 1940 as part of the exchange of programs program with Latin America. Leading musicians from the region were subsequently invited during the decade to CBS's broadcasting studios in New York City in order to perform on the Viva America radio program for the State Department's Office for Coordination of Commercial and Cultural Relations (OCCCRBAR) and the Office of the Coordinator of Inter-American Affairs.

Following World War II, Senator J. William Fulbright introduced legislation for what would become the Fulbright Program in 1946. One of the most significant moments in the formalization of exchange programs as tools of American Foreign Policy came under U.S. President Dwight D. Eisenhower. In 1955, Eisenhower met with Soviet Premier Nikita Khrushchev in Geneva. Soon after this meeting, Eisenhower said, "The subject that took most of my attention was the possibility of increased visits overseas by the citizens of one country into the territory of the other nation. In this subject there was the fullest possible agreement between the West and the Soviet Union".

In 1959, the exchange programs aspect of the State Department was separated from the Public Affairs Bureau to form the Bureau of Educational and Cultural Relations. In 1961, Congress passed the Mutual Educational and Cultural Exchange Act (also known as Fulbright-Hays Act of 1961), mandating an increase in governmental programs to enhance mutual understanding between the people of the United States and other countries.

== Cold War ==
Exchange Programs from the United States played a vital role during the Cold War with the Soviet Union. George Kennan, a key figure in the Cold War known as the father of containment, viewed culture as a way to decrease negative sentiments between countries. Examples of cultural exchange programs between the United States and the Soviet Union include theater, museum, and opera expositions. Although not political on the surface, cultural exchanges like these helped alleviate tensions and "humanize" the West in the eyes of the Soviets who witnessed them.

In addition to Americans visiting the Soviet Union, approximately 50,000 Soviet citizens visited the United States, including writers, politicians, musicians, and other arts figures. Oleg Kalugin, former KGB general and head of KGB operations in the United States, noted that these exchange programs were a "Trojan Horse", because they "eroded" the Soviet system.

== Post-Cold War ==
In 1993, the Alliance for International Educational and Cultural Exchange (The Alliance) was created following the merger of the International Exchange Association and the Liaison Group for International Educational Exchange. This merger made The Alliance the central association for United States exchange programs. Today, The Alliance is composed of 76 non-governmental organizations. The Alliance's activities include formulating specific recommendations to support public policy regarding educational and cultural exchanges.

Following the collapse of the Soviet Union, but before the September 11 attacks, funding for exchange programs declined. The number of exchanges per year dropped from nearly 45,000 individuals to less than 30,000. The State Department recognizes a general lack of funding. While spending on traditional diplomacy amounted to $25 billion in 2002 and intelligence spending was $30 billion the same year, spending on exchange programs was at $232 million, a decline from the $349 million spent on exchange programs in 1993.

As of 2003, exchange programs sponsored by the United States Government have brought roughly 700,000 foreigners to the United States. The ECA indicates that at least 200 heads of state (both current and previous) have received an education in the United States from one of these exchange programs. Additionally, approximately 1,500 high ranking ministers have similarly participated in such programs.

=== Significance to US Foreign Policy ===
Individuals brought to the United States or who experience Americans abroad through cultural exchange programs may develop an impression of both American culture and the government of the United States. Those who have been educated in the United States may develop an appreciation for American culture. Many of these individuals enter into positions that affect the foreign policy of the United States, such as Margaret Thatcher and Anwar Sadat.

== Trends ==
Following 9/11, there has been an increase in U.S. Government support for cultural exchange programs in the Middle East. In 2003, for example, 25% of governmental funding for cultural exchange programs was targeted at Arab and Muslim countries. This increase in targeted spending led to the creation of the Partnership for Learning (P4L), which "provides scholarships for secondary school students from countries with significant Muslim populations to spend up to one academic year in the United States. The program is vital to expanding communication between the people of the U.S. and the partner countries in the interest of promoting mutual understanding and respect".

== Examples of Exchange Programs ==
=== Critical Language Scholarship Program ===
The Critical Language Scholarship (CLS) Program is a program offered by the State Department as part of the National Security Language Initiative. It offers language students of those languages deemed "critical" to the needs of the United States full scholarship to live and study in a target country. Students live in host family environments and are completely immersed in the target country's language and culture. Students are expected to continue their study of the target country's language and culture following completion of the program.

=== Fulbright Program ===
The Fulbright Program, operating in more than 155 countries, serves to increase understanding between United States citizens and citizens of foreign countries. Since its inception in 1946, the program has counted over 114,000 people from the United States and 186,000 citizens of other countries. In 2010, The Fulbright Program received $253.8 million from the United States government, while the total of foreign contributions to the program totaled $68.5 million.

=== International Military Education and Training Program ===
The International Military Education and Training Program (IMET) was created following the Foreign Assistance Act of 1961. It is funded via the International Affairs budget of the United States Department of State, though is used by the Department of Defense. Its two goals are to increase regional stability and to increase the understanding democratic principles and human rights among foreign militaries and civilians. To these ends, foreign students are exposed to U.S. military procedures and general American culture. This program includes over 2,000 courses and offers instruction at nearly 150 military installations.

=== International Visitor Leadership Program ===
The International Visitor Leadership Program (IVLP), formerly the International Visitor Program, seeks to bring promising or current leaders of foreign countries to the United States in hopes of building lasting ties. Colin Powell estimated in 2003 that 39 of the then current heads of state formerly participated in the IVLP.

=== Peace Corps ===
The Peace Corps is a cultural exchange program run by the United States government. Founded in 1960 following then-Senator John F. Kennedy's challenge to University of Michigan students to serve the country by living and working in foreign countries, the Peace Corps serves as a vital federal agency for promoting understanding of foreign cultures among Americans and of American culture among foreigners in troubled regions of the world. Over 200,000 Americans have volunteered in the Peace Corps since its inception in 139 countries.

=== People to People Ambassador Program ===
Founded as part of the U.S. Information Agency by U.S. President Dwight D. Eisenhower in 1956 to ease tensions during the Cold War, the People to People initiative offered non-governmental contacts between people of different countries. Following Eisenhower's departure from office, the program was privatized and incorporated in the state of Missouri. People to People provides four core programs, including Student Ambassadors, Sports Ambassadors, Leadership Programs, and Citizen Ambassador Programs. More than 500,000 people have participated in these programs.

== See also ==
- American Film Program
- Bureau of Educational and Cultural Affairs
- Carnegie Hall Cultural Exchange
- Cultural diplomacy
- Benjamin A. Gilman International Scholarship
- Student exchange program
- The Rhythm Road: American Music Abroad
