= Alliance for International Educational and Cultural Exchange =

The Alliance for International Exchange (formerly Alliance for International Educational and Cultural Exchange) is an association of non-governmental exchange programs in the United States. The Alliance was founded in 1993 following the merger of the International Exchange Association and the Liaison Group for International Educational Exchange. Following this merger, the Alliance became the sole collective voice of the 76 non-governmental organization exchange programs for the purpose of developing a unified public policy voice.

== Guiding principles ==
The Alliance's stated mission is "to formulate and promote public policies that support the growth and well being of international exchange links between the people of the United States and other nations". The Alliance operates under five guiding principles:

- The experience and relationships gained through international exchange are essential to furthering global peace, freedom, mutual understanding, international cooperation, economic prosperity, and the growth of human knowledge;
- International exchange enhances the effectiveness of the United States in dealing with other nations by building the global competencies of U.S. citizens and others skills increasingly important in the world of the 21st century;
- Participating in an international exchange program contributes fundamentally to a person's intellectual development;
- The conduct of the international exchange program must embody the highest standards of quality, integrity, and professionalism, and must offer the fullest possible equality of opportunity; and
- The international exchange community in the United States has a responsibility to advocate public policies needed to sustain and strengthen international linkages with other countries through educational and cultural exchanges.

The Alliance produces specific recommendations for public policy makers concerning the exchange organizations that it represents. Further, it provides an opportunity for the leaders of the various exchange organizations to come together and exchange ideas or concerns. One of the core organizational activities of the Alliance is the spreading of public awareness of the role of exchange programs in meeting real demands.

== View on exchange programs ==
The Alliance has four stated views on the role that exchange programs play in international relations. First, the Alliance believes that participants who engage in exchange programs and those who encounter exchange program participants experience a change in understanding of other cultures. Secondly, these types of exchanges allow for participants and others to grow and to develop new or refined skills. The third role is economic as people brought to the United States necessarily expend money and benefit local economies. The final role that the Alliance states is integral to exchange programs is in leadership training. The Alliance believes that exchange programs advance leadership skills that may be used in the future in finding solutions to the critical problems facing the United States, domestically and internationally.
