= Youngistaan Foundation =

Indian non-profit organization

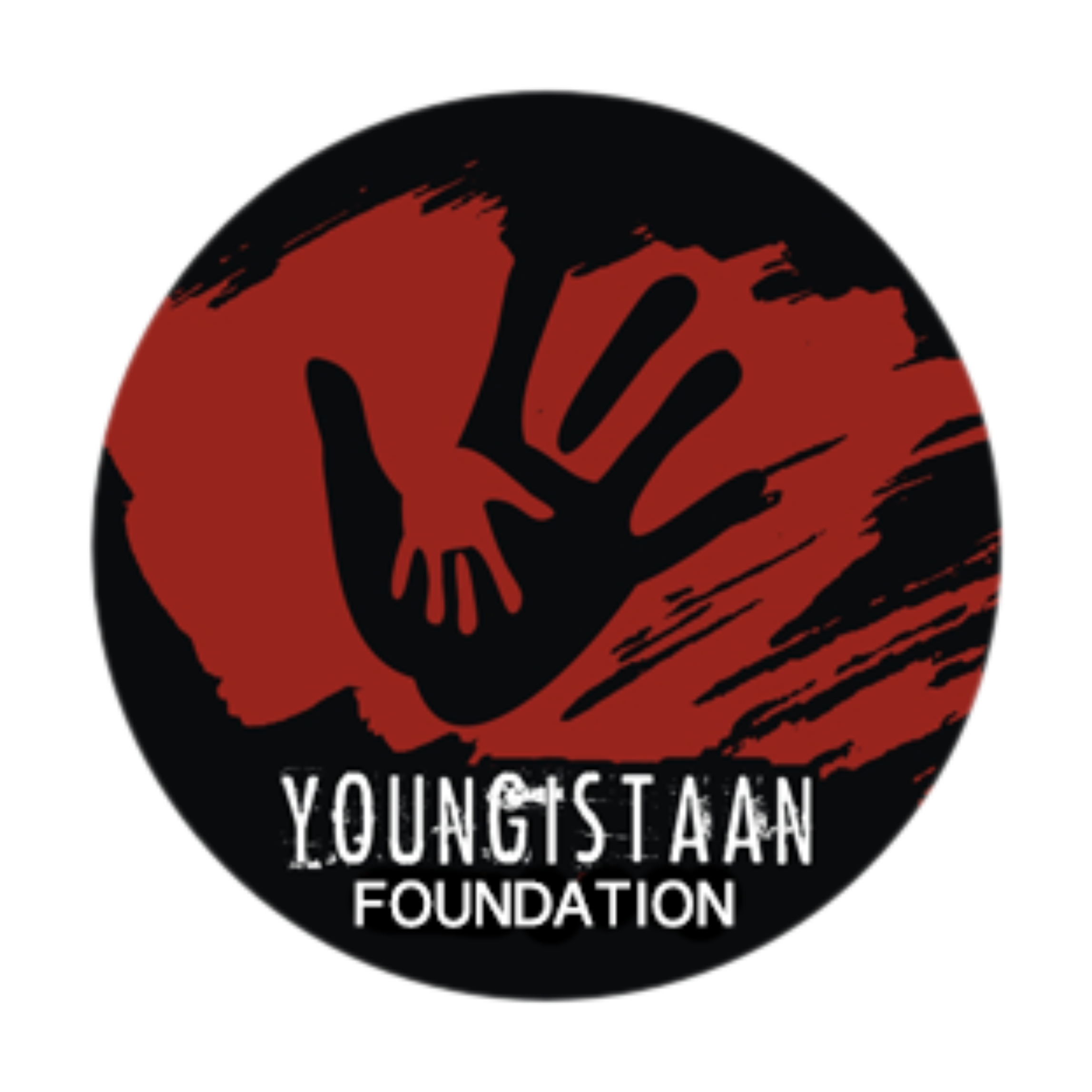
- Formation: 2014; 12 years ago
- Founder: Arun Daniel Kumar Yellamaty
- Type: Non-Governmental Organization
- Purpose: Social Welfare and Humanitarian Services
- Region served: India
- Website: youngistaanfoundation.org

Youngistaan Foundation, is a non-governmental organization based in India, that work towards providing humanitarian assistance to underprivileged communities and addressing societal issues.

== History ==
Youngistaan Foundation is an Indian non-profit organization founded in 2014 by Arun Daniel Kumar Yellamaty. Arun established the organization to encourage active participation in addressing societal issues, especially those impacting underprivileged communities in India, through diverse programs and initiatives.

Youngistaan Foundation is headquartered in Hyderabad, Telangana, with operations in various cities across India, including Delhi, Bangalore, Pune, and Mumbai.

Youngistaan Foundation operates five core programs and multiple need-based initiatives addressing social issues such as hunger, homelessness, gender equality, education, animal welfare, youth development, democracy, climate action, and emergency responses. These initiatives are aligned with nine United Nations Sustainable Development Goals (SDGs) and aim to create a sustainable impact on individuals and communities.

=== Notable associations ===
Youngistaan Foundation collaborates with various stakeholders, including government and police officials, civil societies, NGOs, donors, and corporate partners. Notable government partners include UNICEF, the Department of School Education, Telangana State Police, Women’s Safety Wing, SHE Teams, T-Hub, Telangana State Innovation Cell (TSIC), TASK (Telangana State), GHMC, WE-Hub, the Ministry of Social Justice and Empowerment, and the Women and Child Welfare Department. Corporate partners include Synchrony, Dr. Reddy’s, JP Morgan, Wipro, and IKEA. These collaborations enable efforts to address various societal issues and contribute positively within communities, making tangible differences in people's lives.

== Awards and recognition ==
Youngistaan Foundation has received the following awards and recognitions:

- Social Media for Empowerment Award at the 2017 South Asia Awards
- Outstanding Young Persons Award by Junior Chamber International (JCI) in 2017.
- Young Achiever of the Year-Social Service Award at the Sakhi Media Excellence Awards 2020.
