= Youth For Understanding =

Educational exchange organization

- Founded: 1951
- Founder: Rachel Andresen
- Location: Washington, D.C.
- Origins: Ann Arbor, Michigan
- Region served: Worldwide
- Method: International exchange programs
- Key people: Rachel Andresen, Eric Simon, Ulrich Zahlten
- Website: yfu.org

Youth For Understanding (YFU) is an international educational exchange organization. A network of over 45 independent national organizations worldwide, YFU representatives work together to advance learning across cultures.

Each year, YFU exchanges approximately 4,500 students worldwide.

== Organization ==
YFU conducts its exchange programs via direct contact between independent national organizations in over 45 countries. These autonomous organizations represent the international community network of YFU. Other YFU international activities are carried out by a volunteer International Board and a professional staff known as the Global Office. YFU organizations around the world subscribe to a set of basic operating and philosophic basic standards. The umbrella body for national Youth For Understanding organisations across Europe is EEE-YFU.

== History of YFU ==
Youth for Understanding was founded by Rachel Andresen. In 1951 it was proposed to church leaders in Ann Arbor, Michigan, USA that teenagers from Germany be brought to the United States to live with a family and attend high school for a year. As a result, 75 German teenagers arrived in Michigan in July 1951 and were hosted by volunteer U.S. families.

The exchange program itself originated in late summer 1951 by the High Commission in Germany as the "Urban/Rural Teen-Age Exchange Program". Already in its first year it was supported by members of the Michigan Council of Churches (MCC) under the motto "Youth for Understanding". Within the next 10 years it evolved into two organizations YFU-USA and YFU-Germany. The first "exchange" from the United States to Germany was a summer program with 30 US high school students organized by MCC-alumni. During that year, Germany became a sovereign country, and the US government stopped funding the exchange program with Germany, which continued as a not-for-profit activity between the two YFU organizations. In 1961/62, a one-year exchange program from the US to Germany was added with 6 initial students from the US. YFU Japan and YFU Mexico were established in 1958.

YFU, Inc., the non-profit educational organization, was established in 1964, and the organization's offices were moved to Rosedale in Washington, D.C., in 1978.

On March 8, 2002, YFU, Inc. ceased operations and filed for Chapter 11 bankruptcy later that year.

The YFU organization in United States was reorganized as YFU USA Inc., which opened on March 9, 2002. The organization's offices were moved to Bethesda, Maryland later in 2002. Ulrich Zahlten, founder and former chair of YFU Deutschland, became the new chairman of the board of YFU USA.

=== Organization ===
The guidelines for the work of the national YFU organizations will be decided by the International Advisory Council. The committee, which meets twice a year, consists of 15 representatives from national organizations. The national organisations from the United States, Germany and Japan as the largest members are constantly represented; the remaining sites are occupied in turn by other partners. The International Advisory Council is supported by the International Secretariat.

== European Educational Exchanges – Youth for Understanding ==
European Educational Exchanges – Youth for Understanding (EEE-YFU)
- Founded: 1985
- Type: Educational NGO
- Location: Brussels, Belgium
- Region served: Europe and International
- Key people: Chair – Marc Weiss, Vice Chair – Sara Brandt Treasurer – Liviu Grigorescu Board members – Knut Möller, Gregory Matheson, Laura Gabriela Balanescu

European Educational Exchanges – Youth for Understanding (EEE-YFU) is an international youth exchange non-profit organisation, founded in 1985. It is the umbrella body for national Youth For Understanding organisations across Europe and consists of 28 members.

The mission of EEE-YFU is to advance intercultural understanding, mutual respect, and social responsibility through educational exchanges for youth, families, and communities.

YFU was founded shortly after the end of World War II, in 1951. It is one of the world's oldest education exchange organisations and currently has programmes in about 60 countries around the world. Founded to allow young Germans the opportunity to experience another culture outside of their own, YFU organised for them to go on exchange to the United States to see what life was like there and to develop an understanding of democracy. Since then YFU has grown and now sends young people between 15 and 18 years old on international high school exchanges to other countries, where the students will live with and become a part of a host family. National YFU organisations from around the world are all independent from one another. However, there does exist an International Secretariat to facilitate co-operation and communication amongst them on a global scale, and to provide them with support.

EEE-YFU is a member organisation, and its members are national YFU organisations in Europe. Unlike the national YFU organisations, it is not involved with the actual logistics and organising of the exchanges. Instead, it is a member organisation which focuses on representing the interests of its members in several different ways. In supporting its members, EEE-YFU has the following aims: to promote intercultural understanding through youth exchange programmes in Europe; to enhance the public visibility for Youth For Understanding in Europe and with European institutions and organisations; to enrich the experience of European exchange students by facilitating educational and content related activities; to facilitate co-operation and networking between member organisations and to provide membership services; to facilitate intra-European activities such as seminars, meetings and conferences on various topics; and to assist in planning and conducting international training for staff and volunteers.

The organisation has its offices in Brussels, Belgium, where it works towards representing its members' interests at European level and to facilitate co-ordination between its national members.

The EEE-YFU board has the ultimate responsibility for the overall strategic direction of the organisation, as well as the European Secretariat based in its office in Brussels. The Secretariat regularly has interns and volunteers (often from the European Voluntary Service programme) working in the office.

EEE-YFU is an international non-profit organisation under Belgian law (AISBL).

EEE-YFU works alongside a number of external organisations, and is regularly granted funding for projects and initiatives by European institutions and other bodies. Its partners include the Council of Europe Directorate of Youth & Sports, the European Commission, the European Youth Forum and the Platform for Intercultural Europe, as well as many others. It receives funding from the European Commission, the Council of Europe and the Belgian state, as well as other bodies. EEE-YFU also works closely with other NGOs involved in the youth field, particularly in relation to organising activities.

EEE-YFU works in three main areas: Capacity building; advocacy and representation; and knowledge building and networking.

The organisation fulfills its objectives by organising and facilitating educational activities to provide on-going education in cross-cultural issues to its students, returnees and volunteers. These help to promote intercultural dialogue and youth participation for a wide range of young people across Europe. EEE-YFU organises activities such as study sessions, trainings and seminars on various cultural and youth-related issues both nationally and on a European level. In doing so it often works closely with its member organisations. An important feature of EEE-YFU's activities is to encourage those students who have participated in exchanges to continue to be involved with YFU by volunteering once they return home. This will help to continue the cycle of learning and will allow YFU to reach out to more young people.

EEE-YFU has its own "European Trainer Network", composed of 13 young trainers from 10 different countries, which provides its member organisations with a pool of young people with relevant expertise and knowledge that they can use to organise and facilitate a range of events. This aims to help to increase the capacity for multiplication of competences and knowledge within the international YFU network, and for contributing to the development of training structures of national YFU organisations to provide high quality educational activities. EEE-YFU also has a "Pool of Representatives", composed of 33 young people from various member organisations. The members are an important tool for EEE-YFU's advocacy work, representing EEE-YFU on various seminars, working groups, meetings, conferences and other events.

The following YFU national organisations are members of EEE-YFU: Austria, Belgium (Flanders & Wallonia), Bulgaria, Czech Republic, Denmark, Estonia, Finland, France, Germany, Georgia, Greece, Hungary, Italy, Latvia, Lithuania, Moldova, Norway, Poland, Romania, Serbia, Slovakia, Spain, Sweden, Switzerland, Turkey.

== See also ==
- World Link
- Ayusa
