= Critical Language Scholarship Program =

American student educational exchange

The Critical Language Scholarship (CLS) Program is a United States Department of State cultural and educational exchange program which offers approximately 500 undergraduate or graduate level students from the United States the opportunity to participate in an intensive language study abroad. This nationally competitive program funds students who study one of the 15 critical need foreign languages, and is part of the National Security Language Initiative. The 15 critical languages are Arabic, Azerbaijani, Bengali, Chinese, Hindi, Indonesian, Japanese, Korean, Persian, Portuguese, Punjabi, Russian, Swahili, Turkish and Urdu. With an acceptance rate of less than 10%, the Critical Language Scholarship is one of the most competitive scholarships in the U.S. and the most prestigious language program for U.S. citizens.

== Program administration ==
The program is administered by American Councils for International Education with awards approved by the U.S. Department of State, Bureau of Educational and Cultural Affairs.

== Eligibility requirements ==
Applicants to the program must be U.S. citizens enrolled in a U.S. degree-granting program at the undergraduate or graduate level at the time of application. Undergraduate students must have completed at least one year of general college course-work by the start date of the program. Other requirements are that the applicants should be in acceptable mental and physical health for which persons granted the scholarship are usually required to submit a satisfactory Medical Information Form and Physician’s Statement. The minimum age is 18 by the beginning of the CLS Program in the particular year.

The scholarship is open to students in all disciplines, including business, engineering, law, medicine, sciences, and humanities. There is also no discrimination on the basis of race, color, religion, national origin, gender, age, or disability in choosing awardees.

== Languages Offered ==
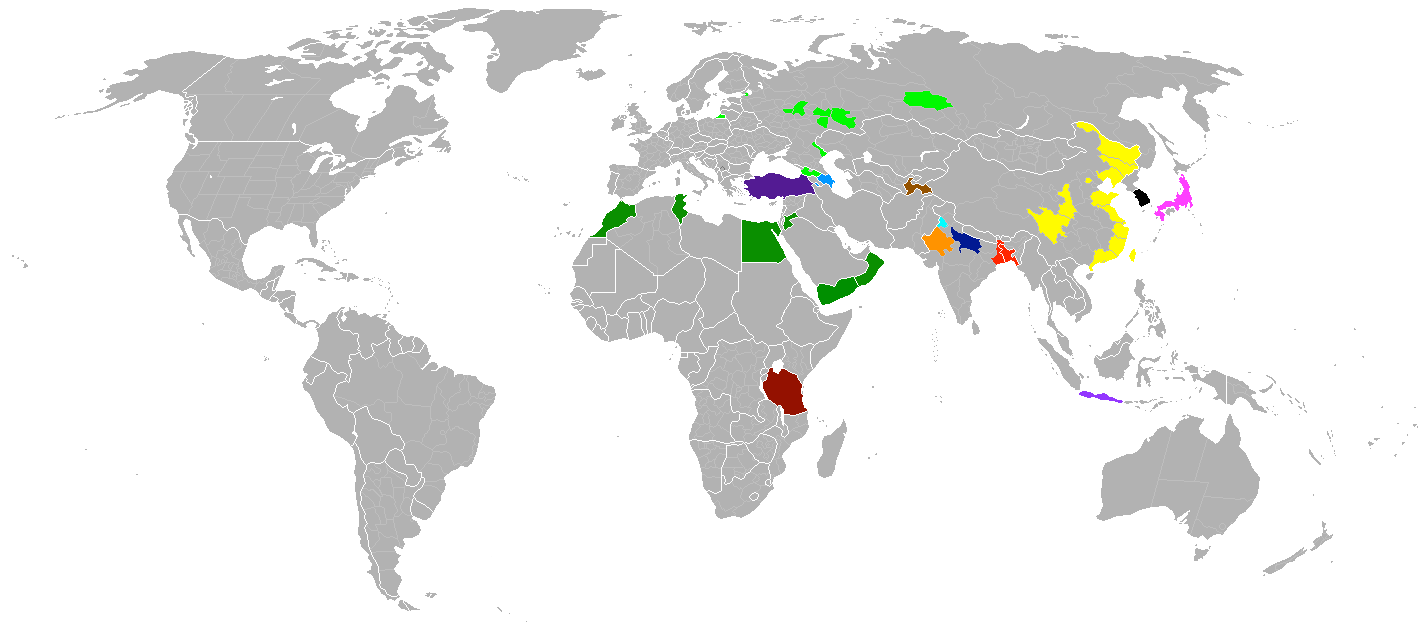
Host countries and territories of the CLS Institutes from 2006-2016.

=== Current Languages ===
As of 2025, CLS offers scholarship for study of the following languages (year of first offering in parentheses):

- Arabic (2006)
- Chinese (2007)
- Hindi (2006)
- Japanese (2010)
- Korean (2007)
- Persian (2007)
- Portuguese (2019)
- Russian (2007)
- Swahili (2016)

=== Previous Languages ===
As of 2025, CLS previously offered scholarships for study of the following languages:

- Azerbaijani (2009-2024)
- Bangla/Bengali (2006-2023)
- Indonesian (2011-2025)
- Punjabi (2006-2022)
- Turkish (2006-2025)
- Urdu (2006-2025)

== Selection process ==
Award recipients will be selected on the basis of merit with consideration for: Academic record and potential to succeed in a rigorous academic setting; Ability to adapt to a different cultural environment; Diversity; Plan for continuation of study of the language; and Plan to use the language in future career. http://www.clscholarship.org/index.php?p=news/2015/sayyestocls All applicants are initially read by two outside academic readers, and the top applications are reviewed by panels of academics and experts in the area and language. Applicants recommended for selection are forwarded to the U.S. Department of State for final approval. After notification, selected participants will be required to complete a language evaluation. Selected applicants will be assigned to a CLS institute site by mid to late April based on language evaluation results along with information provided in the online application.

== Program details ==
The program begins with a virtual pre-departure orientation in the weeks leading up to the program. Students are flown to their respective locations where they delve into the intensive language programs. The program itself involves approximately 15 hours a week of formal language instruction. In addition, CLS participants engage in a variety of language enhancement activities, including conversation partners, guest lectures, film viewings, host family visits (some sites), and cultural excursions. Some institutes require students to take a language pledge, which requires students to speak in the target language at designated times. Upon completing the program, students are asked to provide feedback and participate in post-program language testing.

=== Program in Turkey ===
In 2022 and 2023, participants in the CLS Turkish Institute had 20 per week of class in groups of 4-5 students at the Tömer Institute in Ankara, as well as 8 hours of required meetings with one-on-one language partners and an extra one-on-one session with their teachers. In addition, they had approximately one hour of homework each evening. Program-led excursions included Konya, locations around Ankara, and Cappadocia, though participants could travel on their own during free weekends with director approval.

== Grant benefits ==
All CLS Program costs are covered for participants including: travel to and from the student's U.S. home city and program location, a mandatory Washington, D.C., pre-departure orientation, applicable visa fees, room, board, group-based intensive language instruction, program-sponsored travel within country, and all entrance fees for CLS Program cultural enhancement activities.

=== OPI Scores ===
CLS participants are required to take an oral proficiency interview to measure language improvement over the summer. The scores from the interviews both before and after the program are shared with the students.

== See also ==
- National Security Education Program
- National Security Language Initiative
