= Future Leaders Exchange =

Student exchange program funded by the U.S. Dept. of State

Future Leaders Exchange Global (FLEX Global)
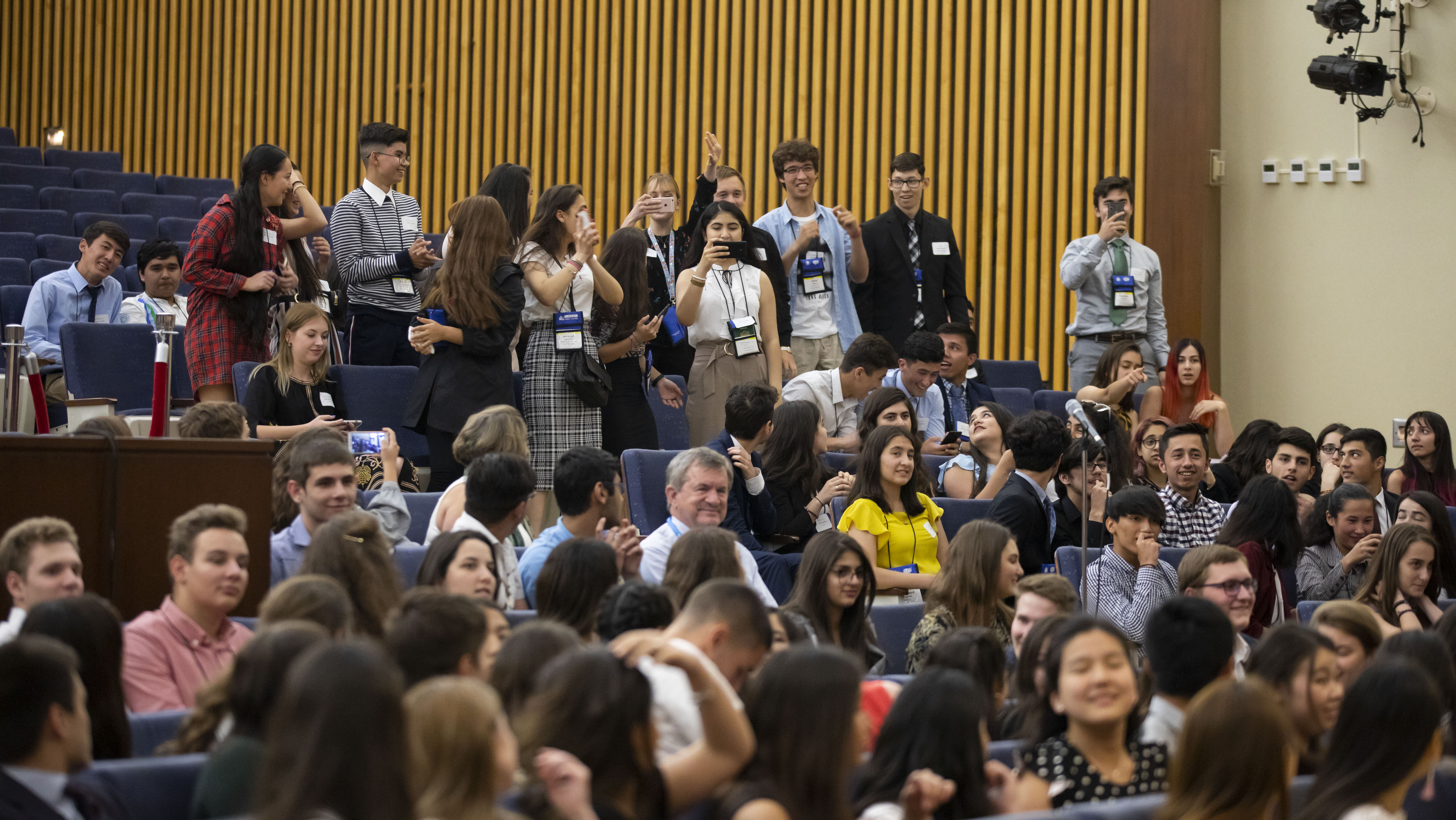
- FLEX end of year meeting in June 2019
- Type: Student exchange program
- Sponsored by: US Department of State
- Country: United States
- Established: 1992; 34 years ago
- Website: Official website

Future Leaders Exchange (FLEX) (Note: Officially FLEX Global) is a scholarship student exchange program, administered by the U.S. Department of State, that gives high school students (aged 15–19), an opportunity to spend a year in the United States, living with a host family and attending an American high school. The program seeks to develop the leadership and cultural awareness of its participants and American communities.

The program is funded and administered by State Department's Bureau of Educational and Cultural Affairs, established through the Freedom Support Act, and implemented by American Councils for International Education. It was created in 1992, for students from Eurasia, mainly from the former Eastern Bloc, since then, it expanded to include a larger list of countries under the FLEX Global umbrella.

The competition is intense. While award statistics vary by country, on average only about one in fifty applicants are ultimately selected. Since its inception in 1992, more than 32,000 high school students from 24 countries have studied in the U.S. under the program.

In 2026, FLEX and YES programs have been de jure combined, however most of the management remains the same as before. For the 2027-28 academic year the FLEX program includes 22 countries, along the past YES participant countries for the entirety of FLEX Global.

== History ==
The program was created in 1992 after former Senator Bill Bradley’s conviction "that the best way to ensure long-lasting peace and understanding between the U.S. and Eurasia is to enable young people to learn about democracy firsthand through experiencing it".

Initially the program included states from the former Soviet Union. First, it expanded to include countries in the Balkans and both central and eastern Europe, and Mongolia. Russia and Belarus used to participate in the program until 2010s, and Uzbekistan pulled out and eventually rejoined the program list.

In 2019 program included Armenia, Azerbaijan, the Czech Republic, Estonia, Georgia, Greece, Hungary, Kazakhstan, Kyrgyzstan, Latvia, Lithuania, Moldova, Mongolia, Montenegro, Poland, Romania, Serbia, Slovakia, Tajikistan, Turkmenistan, and Ukraine.

Due to resource constraints during the Second presidency of Donald Trump, there was no recruitment in Czechia, Greece, Montenegro, and Romania in 2025 for the 2026-27 program year.

For the 2026 Fiscal Year, 2027-28 academic year, FLEX and YES programs were combined to form FLEX Global. FLEX expanded to include Argentina, and Bahrain, while Azerbaijan, the Czech Republic, and some other countries that previously were part of the program before, were no longer eligible. Most of the past YES participant countries were not included for the 2027-28 academic year.

=== Russian participation ===
On 1 October 2014 Russia pulled out of the program. Russian students remaining in the US were allowed by the Russian side to complete their scholarship, and in the next editions, places allocated for Russian students were replaced by students from other countries.

The motive behind Russia's decision to end the cooperation was the case of a 16 year old student who had refused to return to Russia and searched for asylum in the United States, on the grounds that he faced persecution at home because of his sexual orientation. He had met a gay couple of military veterans and asked them for help to stay in the US. A court put the student under the couple's tutelage. Subsequently, Russian officials accused the US of endangering the child's welfare, while American officials suggested that the Kremlin was using the case as a pretext to further impair diplomatic relations.

In 2024, the Russian Ministry of Justice declared American Councils for International Education, the parent organization of FLEX an "undesirable organization" in Russia.

== Selection and participation ==
As of 2026, students are selected from Argentina^{1}, Armenia, Bahrain^{1}, Estonia, Georgia, Greece, Hungary, Kazakhstan, Kyrgyzstan, Latvia, Lithuania, Moldova, Mongolia, Montenegro, Poland, Romania, Serbia, Slovakia, Tajikistan, Turkmenistan, Ukraine, and Uzbekistan. This combines most of the past FLEX countries, as well as the ones added in 2026 (Note: Including the remaining YES countries for the full FLEX Global list.).

^{1} New FLEX countries.

=== Selection criteria ===
- Meet the grade/age requirements;
- Be enrolled in and attending a secondary school in the country in which they apply to the program, at the time of application;
- Be in good academic standing;
- Have previously studied English and demonstrate English language ability at the time of application;
- Meet U.S. visa eligibility requirements; and
- Be a citizen of Argentina, Armenia, Bahrain, Bosnia and Herzegovina, Brazil, Egypt, Georgia, Greece, India, Indonesia, Jordan, Kazakhstan, Kenya, Kosovo, Kyrgyzstan, Moldova, Mongolia, Montenegro, Morocco, North Macedonia, Pakistan, Poland, Romania, Serbia, Tajikistan, Thailand, Tunisia, Türkiye, Turkmenistan, Ukraine, or Uzbekistan, and be able to receive an international passport from the country where they apply.

Each country's application process, and age and grade requirements vary. Most of the previous FLEX countries complete their application online, while applicants in Argentina, Bahrain, and the past YES countries are required to contact their respective FLEX Global country office.

== Notable alumni ==
- Marina Verenikina, '95 alumna, Los Angeles-based singer and musician
- Elena Milashina, '94 alumna, Russian investigative journalist for Novaya Gazeta
- Sergi Kapanadze, '97 alumnus, deputy speaker of Georgia's Parliament
- Andriy Shevchenko, '94 alumnus, Ukrainian politician and journalist, former member of the Verkhovna Rada
- Rustem Umierov, '99 alumnus, Minister of Defense of Ukraine
- Aysel Teymurzada, '05 alumna, Azerbaijani pop and R&B singer.
- Rosa Linn, '18 alumna, Armenian Eurovision contestant and pop singer.
- Doina Nistor, '94 alumna, Economic Development and Digitalization Minister of Moldova.
- Roman Yanushevsky, '95 alumnus, Israeli journalist, Channel 9 TV site Editor-in-Chief, an author at Novaya Gazeta.

== See also ==
- Congress-Bundestag Youth Exchange
- National Security Language Initiative
- Kennedy-Lugar Youth Exchange and Study Programs
- CIS FLEX Community (Russian and also International version)
- CIS Blogs Finalists
