= Bureau of Educational and Cultural Affairs =

U.S. State Department division

- Seal of the United States Department of State

Bureau overview
- Formed: 1961; 65 years ago
- Preceding bureau: Bureau of Educational and Cultural Relations
- Jurisdiction: Executive branch of the United States
- Headquarters: Harry S. Truman Building, Washington, D.C., U.S.
- Employees: 455 (as of 2011)
- Annual budget: $634 million (FY 2017)
- Bureau executive: Catherine Dillon, Assistant Secretary of State for Educational and Cultural Affairs
- Parent department: U.S. Department of State
- Website: eca.state.gov

The Bureau of Educational and Cultural Affairs (ECA) of the United States Department of State fosters mutual understanding between the people of the United States and the people of other countries around the world. It is responsible for the United States' cultural exchange programs.

As of May 18, 2026, Cate Dillon is the Assistant Secretary of State for Educational and Cultural Affairs.

== History ==
In 1940, Nelson Rockefeller began the exchange of persons program with Latin America, as the Coordinator of Commercial and Cultural Affairs for the American Republics. This program sent 130 journalists from Latin America to the United States.

In 1942, The United States Office of War Information (OWI) was created out of the United States Government's need for a centralized location for information. OWI was disbanded under the Truman administration, though a small element of the original structure was maintained within the State Department as the Office of International Information and Cultural Affairs (OIC), which was renamed the Office of International Information and Educational Exchange.

In 1948, the Smith–Mundt Act sought to "promote a better understanding of the United States in other countries, and to increase mutual understanding." The educational and cultural exchange aspects of the State Department were removed from the Bureau of Public Affairs and entered the newly created Bureau of Educational and Cultural Relations (CU) in 1959.

In 1961, the 87th United States Congress passed the Fulbright-Hays Act (Mutual Educational and Cultural Exchange Act) to establish a program to "strengthen the ties which unite us with other nations by demonstrating the educational and cultural interests, developments, and achievements of the people of the United States and other nations". In 1978, the United States International Communication Agency (USICA) absorbed the bureau with the understanding that USICA was in charge of United States public diplomacy. Ronald Reagan renamed USICA to the United States Information Agency (USIA) in 1982, and in 1999, USIA was absorbed by the State Department.

== Programs ==
- Alumni TIES (Thematic International Exchange Seminars)
- Benjamin A. Gilman International Scholarship
- Congress-Bundestag Youth Exchange
- Cultural Heritage Center
- Edmund S. Muskie Graduate Fellowship Program
- EducationUSA
- English Teaching Forum: A Journal for the Teacher of English Outside the United States
- Fulbright Scholarship
- National Security Language Initiative for Youth (NSLI-Y)
- FLEX Global
  - Future Leaders Exchange (FLEX)
  - Kennedy-Lugar Youth Exchange and Study (YES)
- Hubert Humphrey Fellowship
- International Visitor Leadership Program
- TechWomen
- The Stevens Initiative
- Teachers of Critical Languages Program (TCLP)
- CLS Program
- Young African Leaders Initiative (YALI)
- Young Southeast Asian Leaders Initiative (YSEALI)

== See also ==
- Cultural diplomacy
- Assistant Secretary of State for Educational and Cultural Affairs
- Public diplomacy
- United States cultural exchange programs
