= Kennedy-Lugar Youth Exchange and Study Programs =

Student exchange program funded by the U.S. Department of State

Kennedy-Lugar Youth Exchange and Study Programs (KL-YES)
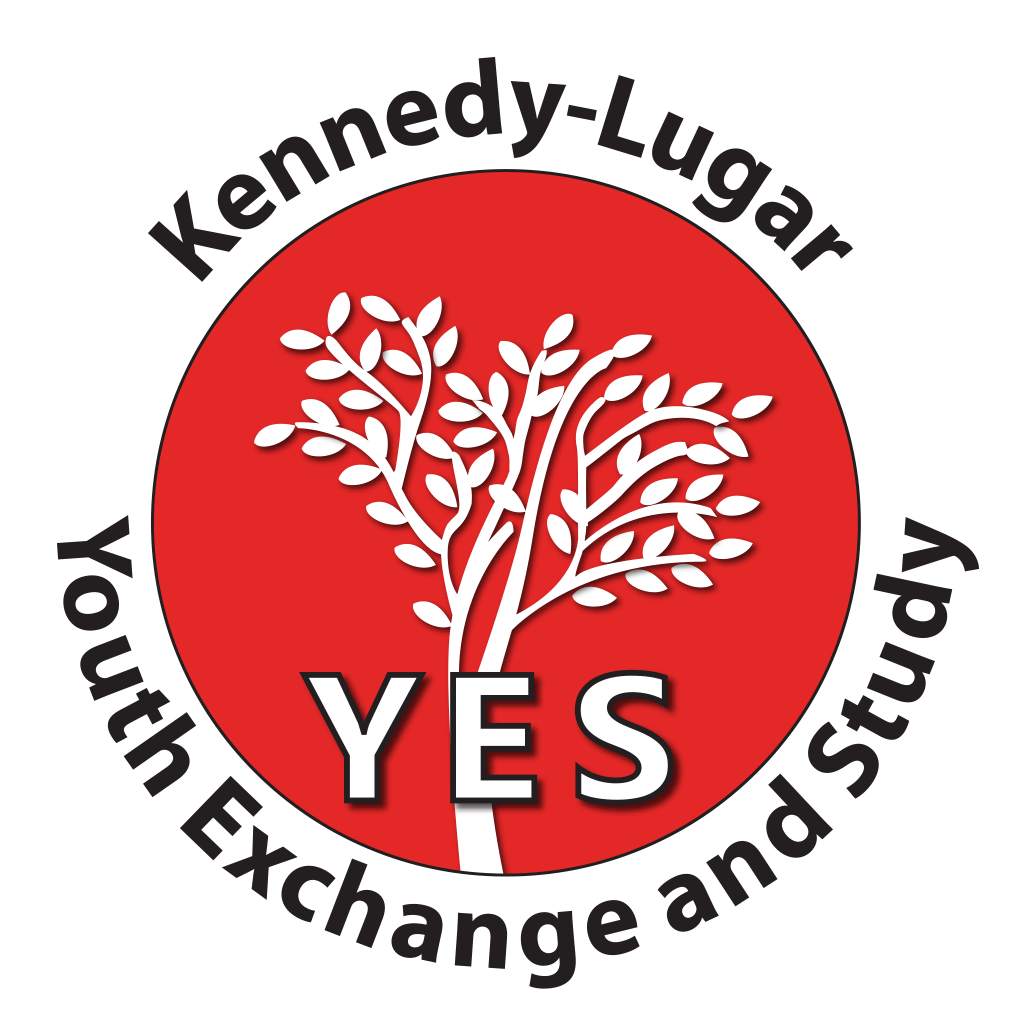

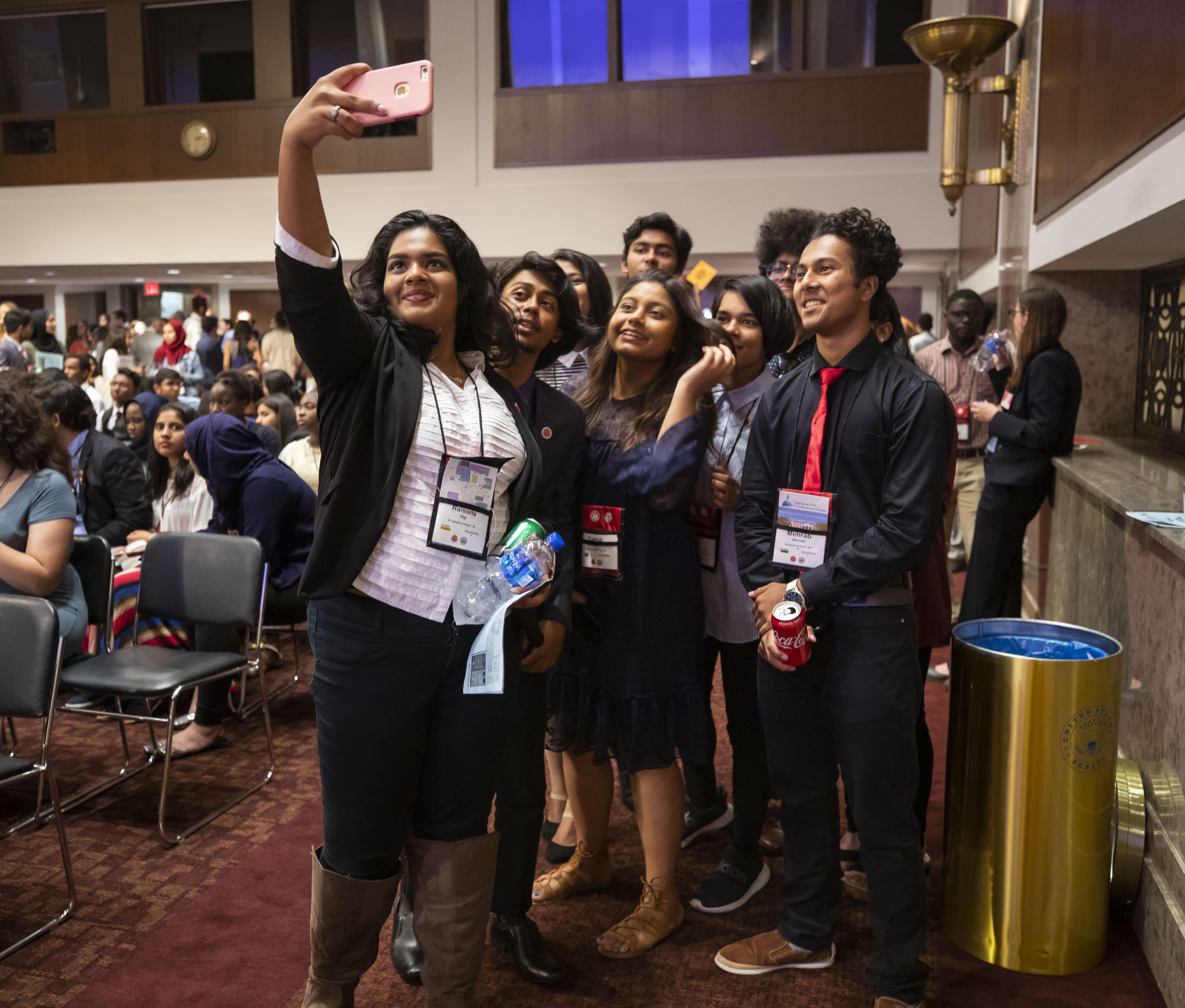
- End of State reception of YES and YES Abroad students at Capitol Hill, 2019.
- Owner: Administered by the U.S. Dept. of State
- Country: United States of America
- Ministry: Bureau of Educational and Cultural Affairs
- Launched: October 2002
- Website: yesprograms.org

The Kennedy-Lugar Youth Exchange and Study Programs (KL-YES) are fully-funded student exchange programs administered by the U.S. Department of State. YES includes the "inbound" program for students from close to 35 countries of strategic importance around the world to study and live in the U.S., and the "outbound" program, called YES Abroad, for students from the U.S. to study in selected YES countries.

The Kennedy-Lugar YES Program evolved out of a generalized recognition that public diplomacy efforts had been neglected in many countries around the world for many years and that the effects of this came into stark focus in the aftermath of the events of September 11, 2001. The Bureau of Educational and Cultural Affairs of the U.S. Department of State, along with the U.S. exchange community, recognized the importance of youth exchange as a key component of renewed commitment to building bridges between citizens of the U.S. and countries around the world.

== Kennedy-Lugar Youth Exchange and Study Program ==
The Kennedy-Lugar Youth Exchange and Study (KL-YES) Program was established in October 2002. The program provides scholarships for high school students from countries of strategic importance around the world to spend up to one academic year in the United States. The first class of YES students arrived in the United States in 2003. The program has continued to expand, and has made connections across more than 35 countries including:

- Albania
- Bahrain
- Bangladesh
- Bosnia-Herzegovina
- Bulgaria
- Cameroon
- Egypt
- Ghana
- India
- Indonesia
- Israel (Arab Communities)
- Jordan
- Kenya
- Kosovo
- Kuwait
- Lebanon
- Liberia
- Libya
- Malaysia
- Mali
- Morocco
- Mozambique
- Nigeria
- North Macedonia
- Pakistan
- Saudi Arabia
- Senegal
- Sierra Leone
- South Africa
- Suriname
- Tanzania
- Thailand
- Tunisia
- Turkey
- West Bank

== Kennedy-Lugar YES Abroad program ==
The Kennedy-Lugar YES Abroad program, sponsored by the U.S. Department of State, Bureau of Educational and Cultural Affairs, was initiated as a reciprocal extension of the YES program with the first group of American high school students and recent graduates participating in the 2009–10 academic year. YES Abroad is focused on cultural exchange and offers full scholarships for one academic year to live and study abroad in selected YES countries.

The scholarship covers costs related to round-trip airfare, room and board for necessary pre-departure orientations, support within the host country, cultural enrichment activities, school tuition (where applicable), room and board with a host family, secondary medical benefits, visa fees, and a modest stipend.

As of 2018, YES Abroad countries include:

- Bosnia and Herzegovina
- Bulgaria
- Ghana
- India
- Indonesia
- Jordan
- North Macedonia
- Malaysia
- Morocco
- Senegal
- Thailand
- Turkey

YES Abroad students serve as “youth ambassadors” of the United States, promoting mutual understanding by forming lasting relationships with their host families and communities. Participants live with a host family, attend a local high school, acquire leadership skills, and engage in activities to learn about the host country's society and values; they also help educate others about American society and values.

== YES Alumni Associations ==
YES students returning from their exchange year in U.S. are welcomed by the alumni communities in their country. These YES alumni communities actually help students to settle back into their original culture after having spent up to a whole year of learning in the host country. These YES alumni communities are also responsible for helping returnees to cope with the reverse-culture shocks.

Most of the YES alumni communities across the world are involved with volunteering activities that span over educational, cultural and recreational learning. However, these activities are not limited to managing educational projects but also include participation in rehabilitation and social welfare projects. For instance, YES Alumni Pakistan, one of the biggest YES alumni associations in the world, is involved with many of the abovementioned activities all across the year, examples being the rehabilitation project after the 2010 Pakistani floods, the YES Ramadan project in 2013, and numerous other alumni led workshops and seminars. Although one of the smallest associations, YES Alumni Albania has involved in the creation of a volunteers group known as “the YES Volunteers” that help students during different projects that are not necessarily YES affiliated. Many other such projects are also conducted under the banner of YES Alumni associations all around the world. These activities are seen as a reflection of the passion for community service that students are exposed to, over the course of their year abroad.

== See also ==
- Congress-Bundestag Youth Exchange
- Future Leaders Exchange
- National Security Language Initiative
- Near East and South Asia Undergraduate Exchange Program
- Bureau of Educational and Cultural Affairs
