= Congress-Bundestag Youth Exchange =

Program sponsored by the United States and Germany

The logo of the Congress-Bundestag Youth Exchange

The Congress-Bundestag Youth Exchange (CBYX, German name: Parlamentarisches Patenschafts-Programm or PPP) is a youth student exchange program founded in 1983. The program, which is jointly sponsored by the United States Congress and the German Bundestag, funds exchange programs for German and American students through grants to private exchange organizations in both countries. The funding in the United States is administered by the Bureau of Educational and Cultural Affairs of the United States Department of State.

The program was established to celebrate the 300th anniversary of German settlement in North America and has been renewed by both legislative bodies since its inception. Over 26,000 German and American students have completed their exchange through the program, which provides a full exchange year complete with orientation and language programs and travel opportunities within Germany and the United States. The exchange year culminates in a conference in Washington, D.C.

The scholarship program is merit-based and is funded based on the congressional district for Americans and Bundesland for Germans. It consists of a High School program; currently administered by six organizations in the United States.

== High School program ==
Former logo

The largest portion of the scholarship program has been the high school scholarships. Originally the program was only open to high school sophomores and juniors, who would spend their scholarship year in Germany, during what would be their junior or senior year in high school. Currently, the program makes 230-250 (the number fluctuates, depending on funding) national scholarships available to any high school student between the ages of 15-18.5 with a 2.5 or higher GPA on a 4.0 scale, and who is a U.S. citizen, national, or permanent resident. Applications are due in November of the year prior to the scholarship year. After receipt of a full application, select students will be offered an interview, conducted by selection committees in various locations in the United States. These selection committees then put forward the names of the best candidates to receive the scholarships, which are usually approved by the administering organizations.

The following organizations administer the high school program by region:

- AFS Intercultural Programs (AFS) - Northeastern United States, California, Alaska, and South Dakota
- American Scandinavian Student Exchange (ASSE) - Northwestern United States and Western United States
- Council on International Educational Exchange (CIEE) - Southeastern United States and Southwestern United States
- Youth For Understanding (YFU USA)- Midwestern United States, Nevada, and Hawaii

Each program in the United States has a sister program in Germany. Through CBYX's first decade and a half, Youth For Understanding (YFU) had been the primary administrative organization for the program. YFU's organization administration of the CBYX program ended after the dissolution of the United States Information Agency (USIA) in late 1999. The USIA had overseen the program on behalf of the U.S. Federal Government. In 2008, YFU again became a primary administrative organization for the grant.

American students who receive the scholarship usually spend 11 months in Germany. The first few weeks of the program are taken up by an Orientation and Language Camp. The remaining ten months of the program usually see the students spread out over Germany, staying with a host family. They attend a Gymnasium, Realschule, or a Gesamtschule, the German equivalents of high school, for an academic year. Other seminars take place over the course of the year.

== Young Professionals Exchange Program ==
This scholarship exchange is dedicated to young professionals between the ages of 18 and 24 who have clear career goals and some relevant work experience in their career field, as well as an openness to cultural exchange. Currently 75 young Germans and 75 young Americans participate in the exchange, living in all 16 German Bundesländer and 39 US states. The program is designed primarily for young Americans in business, technical, engineering, agricultural and vocational fields, while German participants have all completed an Ausbildung (practical training) in their field. Cultural Vistas administers the program in the United States and the Deutsche Gesellschaft für Internationale Beziehungen (GIZ) GmbH administers the program in Germany.

The application process of the Young Professionals Exchange Program generally mirrors that of the High School program.

After applying for the program, 150 potential candidates are selected to interview in their state of residence; Seventy-five candidates are then selected to participate in the program, which includes:

- placement with a German host, or, if no host family can be found, students are placed in a WG (shared apartment) or Studentenwohnheim (student dorm).
- two months of intensive German language training (depending on each participant's language level)
- a semester at a German university, college [Hochschule], or college of applied sciences [Fachhochschule]
- a five-month internship in the participant's career field
- international airfare, partial living stipends, various seminar expenses, and partial travel expenses

== Vocational Scholarship Exchange Program ==
This scholarship program sends graduating American high school seniors aged 18–19 (some with a vocational specializations and some from regular high schools) to Germany for two months of intensive language training followed by ten months of practical training and schooling in their field of interest. The first two months are spent with the group in Bonn, Germany, where the students live with host families and attend a German language school and cultural excursions. The following ten months are spent apart from the exchange group, where students live with host families in various cities or regions of Germany preassigned by the program. Until the end of the year, students go to a German school. These can include Gymnasiums, Realschules, or depending on one's German speaking level, continuing language school elsewhere. By February, all the students start internships in their particular field of interest. The students may find their own internships, or can ask for help from their host families and/or area representatives. These selections are based on the location of various area representatives and the availability of specific fields of internships in those locations. Students also participate in four seminars: a pre-departure seminar in Washington D.C., a mid-term seminar in Weimar, (with fellow vocational program students) a concluding seminar in Berlin, and a re-entry seminar in Washington D.C. (with all fellow CBYX program participants). Prior German language skills are not required. Nacel Open Door recruits and selects participants for this exchange and administers the program. Open Door International provides services to the students once they are in Germany.

== Program administration in Germany ==
The following organizations administer the CBYX/PPP program in Germany:

- Youth For Understanding Germany
- AFS Intercultural Programs
- Partnership International e.V.
- Experiment e.V.
- GIVE e.V.
- Open Door International e.V.
- Deutsche Gesellschaft für Internationale Zusammenarbeit GmbH
