= ILR =

ILR may refer to:

- Institute for Legal Reform, an advocacy group founded in 1998 by the United States Chamber of Commerce
- Cornell University School of Industrial and Labor Relations
  - Industrial and Labor Relations Review (ILR Review), a publication of the Cornell University School of Industrial and Labor Relations
- Interagency Language Roundtable, an unfunded organization on foreign language activities in the United States Federal Government
  - ILR scale, a measure of language proficiency originally created by the Interagency Language Roundtable
- Indefinite leave to remain, an immigration status in the United Kingdom
- Ivo Lola Ribar Institute, a Serbia-based manufacturer of heavy machine tools
- Independent Local Radio, a term for commercial radio in the United Kingdom and Ireland
- Institut Luxembourgeois de Régulation, a regulatory agency in Luxembourg
- Iowa Law Review, published by the University of Iowa College of Law
- Implantable loop recorder, a medical diagnostic device
- Interleukin receptor (IL-R), a cytokine receptor for interleukins
- Ignitable liquid residues, used in the detection of fire accelerants
- Individualised Learner Record, a data collection submitted by further education providers in England

== See also ==
- Indian Long Range Squadron (ILRS)
