= Defense Language and National Security Education Office =

US federal government initiative

On February 6, 2012, the Defense Language Office and National Security Education Program were merged to form the Defense Language and National Security Education Office (DLNSEO), which consolidates cultural, linguistic, and regional foreign studies education efforts into a single program capable of satisfying national and Department-wide requirements.

== National Security Education Program ==
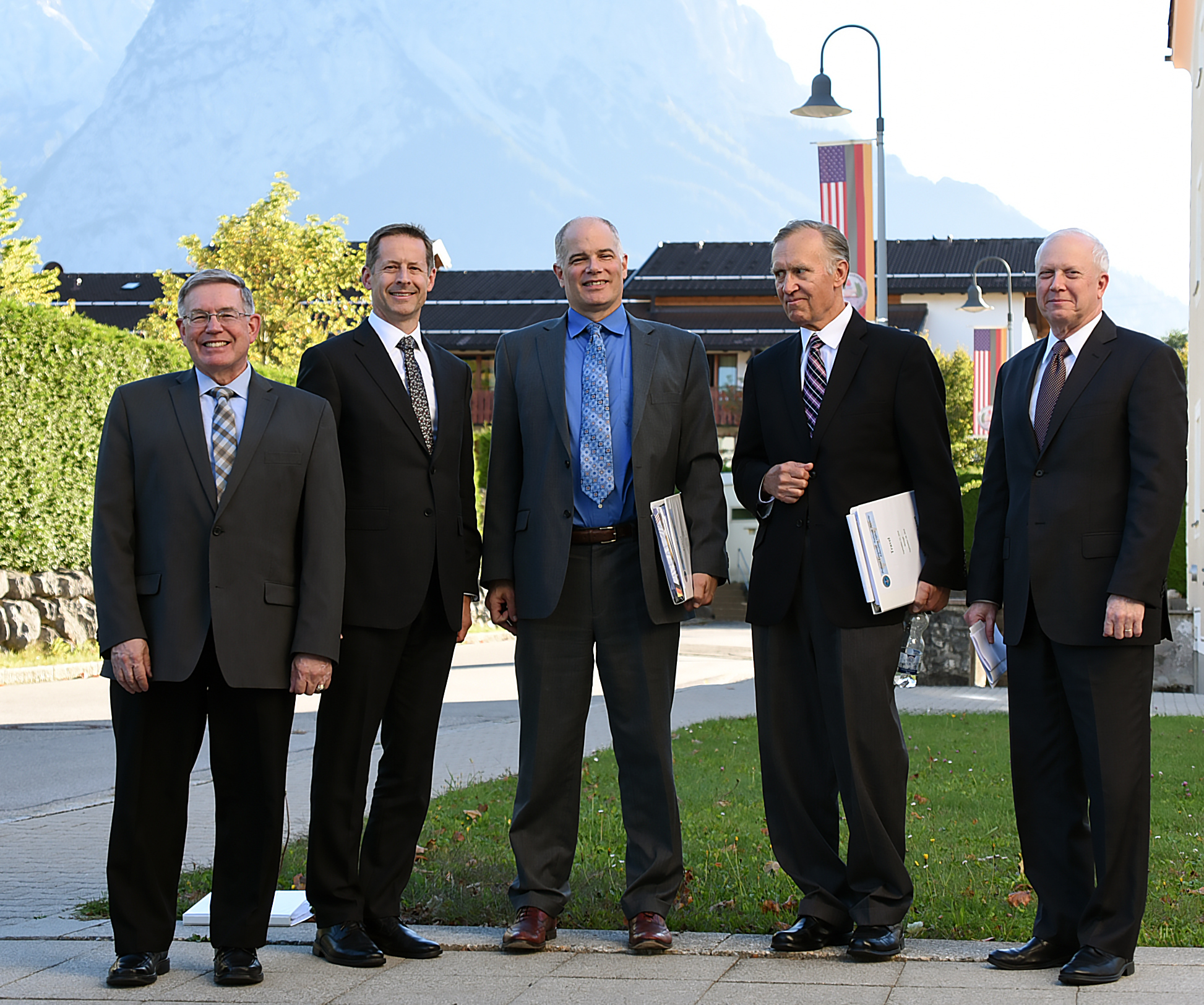
A team of U.S. Defense Department language and education officials—including Michael Nugent, then-director of the Defense Language and National Security Education Office—visited the George C. Marshall European Center for Security Studies’ programs and events in September 2018.

The National Security Education Program (NSEP) was a U.S. federal government initiative to enhance U.S. national security and economic competitiveness by increasing “critical-need” foreign language skills, cultural understanding, and regional expertise within the U.S. federal workforce. NSEP oversaw eight initiatives designed to support and expand language and cultural skills within the federal workforce. NSEP Programs provided pathways to careers in federal government, and select programs included a year-long federal service requirement upon completion of academic study.

NSEP was established by the David L. Boren National Security Education Act in 1991. Oversight for NSEP was provided by the National Security Education Board (NSEB), which met "to review and make recommendations based on program mission and objectives. The NSEB consisted of a 14-member board including representatives from eight Cabinet-level departments. Four non-federal members, appointed by the President, also serve on the NSEB. The Office of the Under Secretary of Defense for Personnel and Readiness (OSD/P&R) provided policy oversight for NSEP.

On February 6, 2012, the National Security Education Program became part of the Defense Language and National Security Education Office, which “provides strategic direction, supports policy development, and provides programmatic oversight to Military Departments, Defense Agencies, and the Combatant Commands on present and future requirements related to language, regional expertise, and culture,” including language and culture support for the DoD.

== Initiatives ==
NSEP oversaw eight programs:

Name	Description	Summary
David L. Boren Scholarships	Scholarships of up to $25,000 for U.S. undergraduate students to study abroad in world regions identified as critical to U.S. interests.	Through a competitive, national, merit-based annual competition, successful applicants distinguish themselves as highly motivated in their academic and career goals and in their strong commitment to public service. In return for support, award recipients commit to a year of national service at a federal agency.
David L. Boren Fellowships	Fellowships of up to $30,000 for U.S. graduate students to research or study in world regions identified as critical to U.S. interests.	Through a competitive, national, merit-based annual competition, successful applicants distinguish themselves as highly motivated in their academic and career goals and in their strong commitment to public service. Award recipients conduct independent projects that combine study of language and culture and commit to a year of national service at a federal agency.
The Language Flagship	Grants to U.S. institutions of higher education to develop and implement advanced, critical language programs.	The Language Flagship seeks to graduate students who will take their place among the next generation of global professionals, commanding a professional-level of fluency (Interagency Language Roundtable (ILR) level 3 or equivalent to Superior level on the American Council on the Teaching of Foreign Languages scale) in a chosen language identified as critical to U.S. security and competitiveness. U.S. university undergraduate students of all majors and language backgrounds participate in intensive domestic and overseas programs designed to give comprehensive language and culture immersion experience.
English for Heritage Language Speakers	Individual scholarships to provide intensive English language instruction at a U.S. institution of higher education to U.S. citizens who are native speakers of critical languages.	The English for Heritage Language Speakers (EHLS) program provides intensive English language instruction to professionals who are U.S. citizens and native speakers of critical languages. Participants receive scholarships to participate in the EHLS program at Georgetown University, which provides eight months of instruction. This training allows participants to achieve professional-level proficiency in the English language and prepares them for specific federal job opportunities. This project is the first of its kind to help nonnative-English-speaking individuals develop high-level English proficiency in reading, writing, listening, and speaking in preparation for public service.
National Language Service Corps (NLSC)	An initiative to create a pool of volunteer language specialists ready to assist the federal government with language needs.	The National Language Service Corps (NLSC) is designed to provide and maintain a readily available corps of civilians with certified expertise in languages determined to be critical to national security who are available for short-term federal assignments based on emergency or surge needs.
Project Global Officer	Grants to U.S. institutions of higher education, with a special priority given to Senior Military Colleges, to improve the language skills, regional expertise, and intercultural communication skills of Reserve Officers’ Training Corps (ROTC) students.	Project Global Officer (Project GO) promotes critical language education, study abroad, and intercultural dialogue opportunities for Reserve Officer Training Corps (ROTC) students nationwide in order to develop future military officers who possess the cross-cultural communication skills required for effective leadership in the 21st Century operational environment.
Language Training Centers	Program leveraging language and culture expertise at U.S. institutions of higher education to provide tailored training in critical languages, cultures, and strategic regions for Active Duty, Reserve Component, National Guard, and DoD civilian personnel.	Language Training Centers (LTC) aim to increase training capacity in critical and strategic languages and regional area studies for DoD personnel. LTC support DoD Total Force language training needs, enabling the DoD workforce to be better prepared and equipped with the language, cultural and regional expertise necessary for foreign nation cooperation and operations.
Regional Flagship Language Initiatives (RFLI)	Initiatives offer Boren Award recipients the opportunity for intensive language study through innovative domestic and overseas language programs in specific languages determined to be critical to US national security.	The Regional Flagship Language Initiatives (RFLIs) are designed to help meet the need for specialists in a range of academic and professional fields who are able to operate effectively in certain regional languages. RFLI currently offers study in African languages, (Akan/ Twi, French, Swahili, Wolof, Zulu), Indonesian, South Asian languages (Hindi, Urdu), Thai, Vietnamese, and Turkish. Boren Scholars and Fellows participating in RFLI programs complete a summer of domestic language training followed by intensive, semester-long language study overseas with the option to continue overseas study into the spring.

== Defense Language Office ==
The Defense Language Office was an office within the United States Department of Defense. It was officially established in May 2005 under the Office of the Under Secretary of Defense for Personnel and Readiness to ensure a strategic focus on language and regional expertise among Defense Department military and civilian workers.” It was created by the Fiscal Year 2005 National Defense Authorization Act, which accompanied the House Report 108-491, "to provide oversight and execution of the Defense Language Transformation Roadmap."

According to the report, the Defense Language Office was set to "ensure a strategic focus on meeting present and future requirements for language and regional expertise among military personnel and civilian employees of the Department. This office should establish and oversee policy regarding the development, management, and utilization of civilian employees as well as members of the armed forces; monitor the promotion, accession and retention of individuals with these critical skills; explore innovative concepts to expand capabilities; and establish policies to identify, track, and maximize the use to meet requirements for language and regional expertise."

== See also ==
- National Security Language Initiative
- Defense Language Institute
