= National Security Language Initiative =

Language education program

NSLI-Y
- The National Security Language Initiative

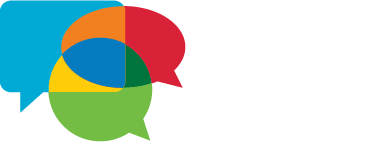
- Formation: 2006
- Founded: 2006
- Founder: • U.S. Department of State
- Type: Government initiative
- Purpose: Language education and cultural diplomacy
- Region served: United States Host countries: • South Korea • Taiwan • China • Jordan • Morocco • Kyrgyzstan • Estonia • Latvia • Kazakhstan • Indonesia • Turkey • Tajikistan Historic host countries: • India • Egypt • Russia • Bangladesh • Pakistan (Host countries are subject to annual review)
- Members: 9,200 alumni (2024)
- Students: 559 scholarship recipients in 2024; 535 to be distributed in 2025
- Website: https://www.nsliforyouth.org/

The National Security Language Initiative for Youth (NSLI-Y) is a US Department of State ECA program launched in 2006 by President George W. Bush to develop the foreign language skills of American high school students in eight critical-need languages. Korean, Mandarin, Russian, Arabic, Hindi, Bahasa Indonesian, Tajiki, and Turkish are all taught in summer and academic year programs abroad.

== Target Language Programming ==
Language education is the primary objective of the program, and the majority of time abroad is spent focusing on this. Each in-country program is facilitated by a different organization, contracted by the US Department of State.

Target language programming begins with mandatory predeparture online language class. This is done at the student's own pace and is aimed at getting all students in the cohort to the same general baseline level. Students then take an Oral Proficiency Interview, or OPI, to determine their language ability before taking part in the program.

All eight summer language programs are 6–7 weeks in duration and take place between mid June to early August. Academic year programs vary more significantly by country, but generally take place from September to May.

During summer programs abroad, students take 5–7 hours of language class per day, as well as receive daily homework. Language instruction is carried out in a full immersion setting, without the use of English for teaching, including for beginners. An immersion setting helps students pick up on both tangible language skills and on subtle nuances of the language such as regional dialects, slang, and nonverbal cues. Language teachers provide supplemental lectures and are available for office hours throughout the program.

All NSLI-Y programs consist of homestays. Host families are selected and vetted by local implementing organizations; often chosen families have previously hosted NSLI-Y or other exchange students. In the uncommon event of a program being unable to find enough volunteer hosts, students could be placed two to a family, or in some instances placed in dorms. Freedoms vary program to program, but students are generally allowed a loose leash to explore inside their city after classes and on weekends. All programs require students to navigate public transportation from their host family's residence to school daily. This commute can consist of subway, bus, train, bike and often takes between thirty minutes and an hour and a half one way.

Most weeks NSLI-Y cohorts take 1-3 day group excursions to different regions of their host country. These include trips to other major cities or landmarks, or to sites of major political importance such as the DMZ for Korean cohorts and Kinmen Island for Taiwanese cohorts. These trips are an integral part of cultural education that NSLI-Y students receive and are often some of the most enjoyable parts of students' exchanges.

Cultural programming with local students is also a cornerstone of NSLI-Y in-country programming. Varying program to program, most NSLI-Y students are paired with local partners (high school and/or college students) who complete cultural or linguistic missions together around the host city independently.

In the case of emergencies, diplomatic staff from the local American embassy or consulate are available to assist. If necessary, NSLI-Y participants would be evacuated alongside diplomatic personnel. Medical insurance is provided for participants as well as access to in-country English speaking medical professionals and American based mental health professionals are available virtually.

Post program, NSLI-Y students are required to take another OPI and score two levels higher if they started at Novice (low, mid, high), and one level higher if they started as Intermediate or Advanced. Continued funding for implementing organizations depends on the students meeting these standardized thresholds. Students who do not meet the required advancement are disadvantaged if applying to future US government scholarships.

The NSLI-Y scholarship is all encompassing and pays for international and domestic flights to the host country, meals, board, and classes while in the host country, as well as significant stipends for use on living expenses abroad.

== Korean ==
South Korea - Virtual and Summer

According to the State Department's grant document, in 2026-2027 there will be 0 virtual, 30~ summer, and 0 academic year Korean NSLI-Y spots. The academic year program for Korean was canceled as a result of State Department budget cuts along with increased costs associated with the exchange program.

=== NSLI-Y Summer Korean Program ===
Incheon Cohort

NSLI-Y summer program in Incheon is implemented by SUNY Korea. The Incheon cohort is 20 students who are placed in host families in Songdo and other neighborhoods in Incheon. Cultural excursions include traveling to the DMZ, a templestay at Bulguk-sa, overnight stays in Kangwha-do or Busan, k-pop dance lessons, and trips to Seoul. Given its close proximity to Seoul, students often go to the city on weekends and afterschool with friends by subway. Students in the Incheon cohort get assigned local university student language partners with whom they complete weekly cultural assignments and are also paired with high school students from the partnering Bakmun Girls High School. Lecturers and guest speakers present to the Incheon cohort on many topics including democratization and economic development, linguistics, traditional arts and pottery and a meeting with North Korean defectors.

Seoul Cohort

The Seoul summer program is implemented by Ewha Women's University or Hanyang University and is the largest cohort at thirty to forty students. Homestays are throughout Seoul and surrounding cities and some students have one way commute times of up to two hours. Cultural excursions include meeting Korean and Japanese high schoolers at the US embassy, Korean high school supporters, a graduation trip to the eastern coast beach city Gangneung, a baseball game, and other annual programs. Students from the Seoul cohort often complain that because of the many English speakers in the city, it was harder to utilize their Korean skills in their everyday lives.

Yongin Cohort

Yongin-si summer NSLI-Y program is implemented by the American Cultural Exchange Service (ACES) with classes being held at Dankook University and consists of 15 students. Yongin is a midsized city located roughly two hours south of Seoul. Students are placed with host families in Yongin and are assigned Korean peer partners from Dankook University. Cultural programming includes pottery, Korean war and economic development lectures, a templestay at Beopju-sa, a baseball game, k-pop dance lessons, and trips to Seoul both as a cohort and with host families.

Jeonju Cohort

Jeonju is a small to midsized city located in the southwest of South Korea in Jeolla-do. The Jeonju summer NSLI-Y cohort is 15 people and is implemented by American Councils. Jeonju is most known for being a traditional Korean city with minimal western influence, and most students are placed with host families who live in Hanok villages. Cultural programming for the cohort includes a templestay at Bulguk-sa, hiking in Andong, Korean saunas, and traditional cultural excursions throughout Jeonju and Jeolla-do.

- All Korean summer cohorts follow different curriculum, but students in all programs receive equally quality teaching that consistently meets the OPI thresholds set by the State Department. NSLI-Y summer cohorts operate entirely independently of each other and there are no programs done as a group between different cohorts.
- Cohorts are generally divided by preprogram Korean knowledge, but which cohort is advanced/beginner varies.

=== Korean Academic Year ===
The NSLI-Y Korean Academic Year program is held annually in Seoul and the scholarship is awarded to 10-15 students per year. Over the course of the academic year (September to May) students are placed with host families, take classes in local Korean high schools and also receive 10 hours of Korean language instructional time per week. Most participants already have an Intermediate proficiency level and leave the program as Advanced. Programming is more varied and can include trips to Jeju-do, academic conferences/lectures, sports, and annual holiday celebrations.

=== Korean Virtual NSLI-Y ===
Korean virtual NSLI-Y is implemented by the Department of East Asian Studies at Yale University. The intensive language class teaches absolute beginners the basics of Korean including hangul, counting, and basic conversation. By the end of the course students are able to read, write, and carry out everyday conversations at a Novice-Low level. Classes are twice a week for 2.5 hours over the course of ten weeks, adding up to fifty hours of instructional time. During this period, some classes are dedicated to making kimbap, learning Korean history, and guest lecturers teaching Minhwa art, and traditional Korean music.

NSLI-Y student blogs and cohort student-run Instagram pages are great resources for further information.

== Other Language Programs ==
Chinese: (China and Taiwan) - Virtual, Summer, and Academic Year

- In 2026-2027 there will be 50 virtual, 150 summer, and 30 academic year Mandarin NSLI-Y spots.

Arabic: Virtual, Summer (Morocco and Jordan), and Academic Year (Morocco)

(Egypt is being considered as a possible location for 2025-2026 programs.)

- In 2026-2027 there will be 40 virtual, 90 summer, and 12 academic year Arabic NSLI-Y spots.

Russian: Virtual, Summer (Latvia, Kazakhstan, Kyrgyzstan), and Academic Year (Kyrgyzstan)

- In 2026-2027 there will be 50 virtual, 95 summer, and 12 academic year Russian NSLI-Y spots.
- Unlike in previous years, in 2025-2026 there will be no cohorts located in Estonia

Hindi: (India) Virtual and Summer

- In 2026-2027 there will be no summer or academic year cohorts.

Turkish: (Turkey) Virtual and Summer

- In 2026-2027 there will be no virtual and no summer Turkish NSLI-Y spots.

Bahasa Indonesian: (Indonesia) Summer

- In 2026-2027 there will be no summer Bahasa NSLI-Y spots.

Tajiki: (Tajikistan) Summer

- In 2026-2027 there will be no summer Persian NSLI-Y spots.

Student quotas generally remain stable year on year; for the most up to date data refer to the NSLI-Y ECA Grant Document for the upcoming two years.

== Application Process ==
Applications are administered by American Councils for International Education. NSLI-Y summer program is limited to US citizen high schoolers that have completed their freshman year and is open to high school graduates under the age of 19. Academic year programs are available to high schoolers starting their sophomore year but are most popular as a gap year program.

NSLI-Y is a highly competitive program and while the acceptance rate varies by language and program, it averages less than twenty percent. The application process begins in September with a primary application that consists of transcript submission, questionnaires, short answer prompts, and 3-4 essays. This application is due November 1. Semifinalist status is then announced in December, with those advancing being required to provide an interview with a State Department employee and medical forms. Finalists are announced by program in March. Preprogram virtual classes begin promptly and continue until departure in June. Prestudy materials usually take one to five hours per week depending on the student's previous familiarity with the language. The application is intended to select for those best suited for rigorous language education, life abroad through demonstrated independence and maturity, and those with demonstrated interest in the target language/culture/country. Successful virtual NSLI-Y participants applying in the same language to summer or academic year programs are significantly more competitive in admissions. Likewise, successfully completing a summer program makes an applicant much more competitive for an academic year exchange. However, 38% of participants reported having not previously formally or informally studied their target language.

When applying to NSLI-Y, applicants solely provide their first and second choice languages, and cannot request a certain country, cohort, or city. If accepted NSLI-Y assigns students to a cohort and the student cannot change country, language, or cohort.

It is possible to participate in NSLI-Y programs multiple times, however you can only move upwards in duration length. (Those who have done academic year or summer NSLI-Y exchange cannot participate in another summer or virtual program). While uncommon, students who choose to participate in more than one NSLI-Y program do not have to continue studying the same target language.

== Virtual NSLI-Y ==
Launched in 2019, virtual NSLI-Y is a twice per year 10-week language program for absolute beginners. Offered in the fall and winter, programming consists of two online 2.5 hour long classes per week in Korean, Chinese, Arabic, Russian, Hindi, and Turkish. Students are ineligible to apply to any target language program that they have prior knowledge of. Virtual NSLI-Y classes focus on both language and culture, and all target language classes include culture specific programming. Many learn calligraphy, local games, and make one to three local foods. Virtual NSLI-Y programming is unrelated to NSLI-Y summer or academic year courses, are taught by different teachers, and do not have the sole goal of preparing students for further NSLI-Y programs. The majority of virtual NSLI-Y students do not go on to participate in an overseas NSLI-Y exchange.

Target language instruction time is 50 hours, with the goal of achieving Novice Low proficiency. Students can expect between one hour to three hours of out of class assignments and homework in addition to the 5 hours of weekly intensive language instruction.

Virtual NSLI-Y is similarly competitive and has the same application timeline and requirements as the summer and academic year programs, but essay prompts are different. All US citizens attending high school at the time of the program who are younger than 19 are eligible to apply for virtual NSLI-Y.

== Alumni ==
In an alumni report conducted by NSLI-Y in 2023, 85% of alumni continued to study their target language in formal settings, 94% of alumni respondents reported the program as a positive experience in their educational careers and 99% labeled it as "the most or one of the most influential educational experiences in their lifetime."

NSLI-Y programs are highly acclaimed by alumni, many of which attend or have graduated from prestigious universities across the United States and abroad. In addition, many alumni go on to successful careers in the foreign service as diplomats or in prestigious positions in a variety of other fields from academia to the natural sciences and business. NSLI-Y alumni also heavily incentivized and given special status when applying to other US government scholarships, exchanges, and fellowships, particularly in the field of diplomacy and national intelligence.

== History ==
NSLI was launched on January 5, 2006, by President George W. Bush as a means to strengthen national security and expand Cross-cultural communication|intercultural dialogue. The languages sponsored by NSLI-Y were described as critical need languages for Diplomacy|. The program was awarded $114 million by Congress and the State Department's Bureau of Educational and Cultural Affairs in 2007, $26.6 million in 2008, and $750 million in later grants have added to this. The initiative is coordinated by the Department of State, Education Department, Department of Defense and the Director of National Intelligence.

From 2006 to 2008, NSLI-Y's first three years of operation, the program awarded nearly a thousand summer study abroad scholarships in the Arabic and Mandarin Chinese programs. Since then, NSLI-Y has expanded to include Hindi, Indonesian, Korean, Tajiki, Russian, and Turkish languages. NSLI-Y has also begun offering academic year programs in Arabic, Chinese, Korean, and Russian. In 2019 Virtual NSLI-Y was launched to provide language education to absolute beginners. As of 2024, NSLI-Y has accumulated a network of over 9,200 alumni. The White House noted in 2011 that ECA alumni number over one million globally, including over 50 Nobel laureates and over 300 current or former heads of state.

== Criticism ==
When the program was first launched in 2006, several academics expressed concern over the large role the Pentagon played in the initiative. Criticism was initially drawn to the program's announcement in a speech by President Bush at the United States University Presidents Summit in 2006 when he described foreign language education as a means to "defeat [terrorists] in foreign battlefields so they don't strike us here at home." Bush's intentions were initially viewed as an offensive strategy for combating terrorism, rather than as an attempt to promote international diplomacy through intercultural dialogue. As the program grew to encompass more languages, its initial focus on combatting terrorism through cultural diplomacy has waned.

== See also ==
- Critical Language Scholarship (CLS) Program - Nine week college summer intensive language program offering in-country study of thirteen critical languages
- Fulbright Program - US government grant for students, scholars, researchers, and language teachers to research and study abroad
- Kennedy Lugar Youth Exchange and Study Programs - Academic year high school exchange to 18 different Muslim majority countries meant to encourage cultural diplomacy with the aim of combating terrorism and extremist radicalization
- Future Leaders Exchange - Academic year high school exchange to former Soviet Bloc nations to of encourage cultural diplomacy with the goal of combating authoritarianism and instilling a democratic culture through prolonged contact with American youth
- National Security Education Program
- National Language Service Corps
