= Overseas housing allowance (United States military) =

An overseas housing allowance (OHA) is a United States military entitlement given to military servicemen and women living overseas. It is administered by Defense Travel Management Office (DTMO) and is the overseas equivalent of the Basic Allowance for Housing. OHA is intended to private lease local housing instead of living in government or on-base housing. Over $1.8 billion is paid in OHA benefiting approximately 61,000 members annually.

== How it works ==
=== Eligibility Factors ===
OHA is given to servicemembers so that they can provide housing for themselves and their dependents (usually spouse and children). OHA is given when the member and their dependents do not occupy government quarters.

OHA is non-taxable money paid on a monthly basis, and is equivalent to the amount of rent owed under the OHA rate. Whereas servicemembers stationed in the Continental United States (48 contiguous states) are allowed to keep any additional allowance pay that they do not use for their rent, servicemembers do not receive their full complement of OHA if their rents are lower than the maximum allowable rates.

Each servicemember is allowed a set OHA rate, broken down by district, depending on where they are stationed. The rates are slightly higher for those servicemembers with families, otherwise known as dependents. There are three factors for determining the maximum amount of OHA allowed to the servicemember:

1. Pay grade (this is essentially synonymous with rank), the higher the grade, the higher the maximum OHA rate.
2. Location Overseas - BAH is intended to match the average monthly rent in the area where the member is stationed, thus more expensive regions (they are indexed online) receive a higher allocation of OHA. Depending on the status of the assignment (such as temporary duty, or an unaccompanied assignment) the OHA may be calculated where the dependents actually reside.
3. If the member has dependents or not. There are two types or OHA, with dependents and without dependents. The rationale behind this is that a single person doesn't need as much room as a couple or a family. The number of dependents does not affect a servicemember's OHA (a member with a spouse and no children and a spouse and one or several children receive the same amount of OHA).

OHA is paid in the dollar equivalent of the rent due, and therefore rises and falls with monthly changes in the exchange rate.

=== Determining allowances ===
Frequently a "utility allowance" also accompanies OHA. This is usually a flat rate given to the member to cover the cost of utilities, regardless of the actual amount. In certain countries, an additional Move In Housing Allowance (MIHA) is allotted to cover the cost of cleaning, maintenance, repainting, and general refurbishing of the rental unit. Utility/recurring maintenance expenses are calculated annually. Move-in Housing Allowance (MIHA) expenses are calculated every 3 years. Both are based on actual servicemember expense reports. The rent allowance is meant to cover 80% of a servicemember's full expenses and the majority of the remaining 20% servicemember housing expenses.

== See also ==
- Basic Allowance for Housing
- Cost of Living Allowance (U.S. Military)
- Leave and Earnings Statement (LES)
- United States Military Pay
