= CLRC =

CLRC may refer to:

- California Law Revision Commission, an independent state agency in California, US
- Central Laboratory of the Research Councils, UK government research body
- Children's Literature Research Collection (Adelaide), at the State Library of South Australia, Adelaide
- Children's Literature Research Collection (Minneapolis), at the University of Minnesota Libraries
- Civilian Linguist Reserve Corps, now the National Language Service Corps, United States
- Criminal Law Revision Committee, England and Wales
