= Korea Area Incentive Program =

The Assignment Incentive Program - Korea is a system which gives members of the U.S. military an incentive pay for voluntarily extending their tour of duty in the Republic of Korea.

== Reasons ==
A typical tour of duty in South Korea is unaccompanied and one year in duration. This provides for a number of problems involving unit and mission continuity as people are constantly coming, being trained, training their replacements, and then leaving. The KAIP is a chance for the member to receive extra money in exchange for staying for two years instead of one.

== Terms ==
KAIP typically pays a member $300 (taxable) extra per month for every month that they are in Korea. Over a two-year tour, this can amount to an extra $7,200. Some units may allow a member to renew KAIP for a third year. Acceptance of KAIP means losing the chance to take advantage of the follow-on base program. Follow-ons are the number one reason why the service members do short tours in the first place. Typically, if a member gains accompanied status (called command sponsorship), then their regular tour is extended to two years. If they sign up for KAIP then it becomes a three-year tour.

Some services require the member to accept or decline KAIP before their Permanent Change of Station. Others allow the member the option of signing up after they have been in Korea no more than three months. In that case the KAIP money goes into effect upon signing.

== See also ==
- United States military pay
- United States Forces Korea
- Leave and Earnings Statement
