= OPIC (disambiguation) =

OPIC may refer to:

- Overseas Private Investment Corporation
- Oral Proficiency Interview - computer (OPIc): a computerized test of English usage skills
- On-line Page Importance Computation (Selection policy, fifth para)
