= Cost of living =

Cost to live based on price of necessities

The cost of living is the cost of maintaining a certain standard of living for an individual or a household. Cost-of-living calculations are also used to compare the cost of maintaining a given standard of living across different geographic areas. Differences in the cost of living between locations can be measured using purchasing power parity rates.

== Measurement ==
Cost of living is the cost of maintaining a certain standard of living. Changes in the cost of living over time can be operationalized in a cost-of-living index. Cost-of-living calculations can be used to compare the cost of maintaining a certain standard of living across different geographic areas. Differences in the cost of living between locations can be measured using purchasing power parity rates.

Major components of the cost of living include food, housing costs, and energy. Energy costs include heating, light, and cooking costs. In the United Kingdom, about 18% of an average home's energy costs are for water heating.

Consumer price index by country in 2024 compared to 2010 in %: 100 to 110 110 to 120 120 to 130 130 to 140 140 to 150 / 150 to 200 200 to 300 300 to 1000 above 1000 no data

The consumer price index (CPI) measures the prices of goods and services bought by households. Increases in CPI over time show an increase in cost of living in that time period. The increase in the consumer price index within one year is also called the inflation rate.

The Economist Intelligence Unit produces a semi-annual (twice-yearly) worldwide cost-of-living survey that compares more than 400 individual prices across 160 products and services. They include food, drink, clothing, household supplies and personal care items, home rents, transport, utility bills, private schools, domestic help, and recreational costs. The survey itself is an online tool designed to calculate cost-of-living allowances and construct compensation packages for corporate executives who maintain a Western lifestyle. The survey incorporates easy-to-understand comparative cost-of-living indices between cities. The survey allows city-to-city comparisons, but for this report, all cities are compared to a base city, New York City, with an index set at 100. The survey has been carried out for more than 30 years.

In March 2017, Singapore remains the most expensive city in the world for the fourth year running, in a rare occurrence where the entire top five most expensive cities were unchanged from the year prior. Sydney and Melbourne have both cemented their positions as top-ten staples, with Sydney becoming the fifth most expensive, and Melbourne becoming the sixth. Asia is home to more than five of the most expensive cities in the top twenty, but also to eight of the ten cheapest cities.

== Effects ==
A sharp rise in the cost of living can trigger a cost of living crisis, where purchasing power is lost and, for some people, their previous lifestyle is no longer affordable.

The link between income and health is well-established. People who are facing poverty are less likely to seek regular and professional medical advice, receive dental care, or resolve health issues. The cost of prescription medicine is often cited as a metric in cost-of-living research and consumer price indices. Cost of living pressures may lead to household energy insecurity or fuel poverty as well as housing stress. When the cost of living increases without proportional increases in per capita income, then the share of people who do possess the privilege of a comfortable financial situation tends to decrease.

== Causes ==
Some taxes can increase the cost of living, for example studies found sales tax tend to increase prices. Housing costs are a significant share of the cost of living. Increased market concentration and reduced economic competition can increase the cost of living.

A positive annual inflation target by central banks results in a slow increase in the nominal cost of living.

== Cost-of-living adjustment (COLA) ==
Employment contracts and pension benefits can be tied to a cost-of-living index, typically to the consumer price index (CPI). Another statistical measure, COLA, adjusts salaries based on changes in a cost-of-living index. Salaries are typically adjusted annually. They may also be tied to a cost-of-living index that varies by geographic location if the employee moves. In this latter case, the expatriate employee will likely see only the discretionary income portion of their salary indexed to the CPI differential between the new and old employment locations, leaving the non-discretionary portion of the salary (e.g., mortgage payments, insurance, car payments) unmodified. Some examples of cost-of-living adjustments made recently include a 3.2% increase in Social Security benefits and an increase in the maximum annual contribution limit for traditional and Roth IRAs from $22,500 to $23,000, both implemented in 2024.

Annual escalation clauses in employment contracts can specify retroactive or future percentage increases in worker pay that are not tied to any index. These negotiated pay increases are colloquially referred to as cost-of-living adjustments or cost-of-living increases because they resemble increases tied to externally determined indexes. The cost-of-living allowance equals the nominal interest rate minus the real interest rate.

Stipends or extra pay provided to employees temporarily relocated may also be called cost-of-living adjustments or cost-of-living allowances. Such adjustments are intended to offset changes in welfare due to geographic differences in the cost of living. Such adjustments might more accurately be described as a per diem allowance or tied to a specific item, as with housing allowances. Employees who are being permanently relocated are less likely to receive such allowances, but may receive a base salary adjustment to reflect local market conditions.

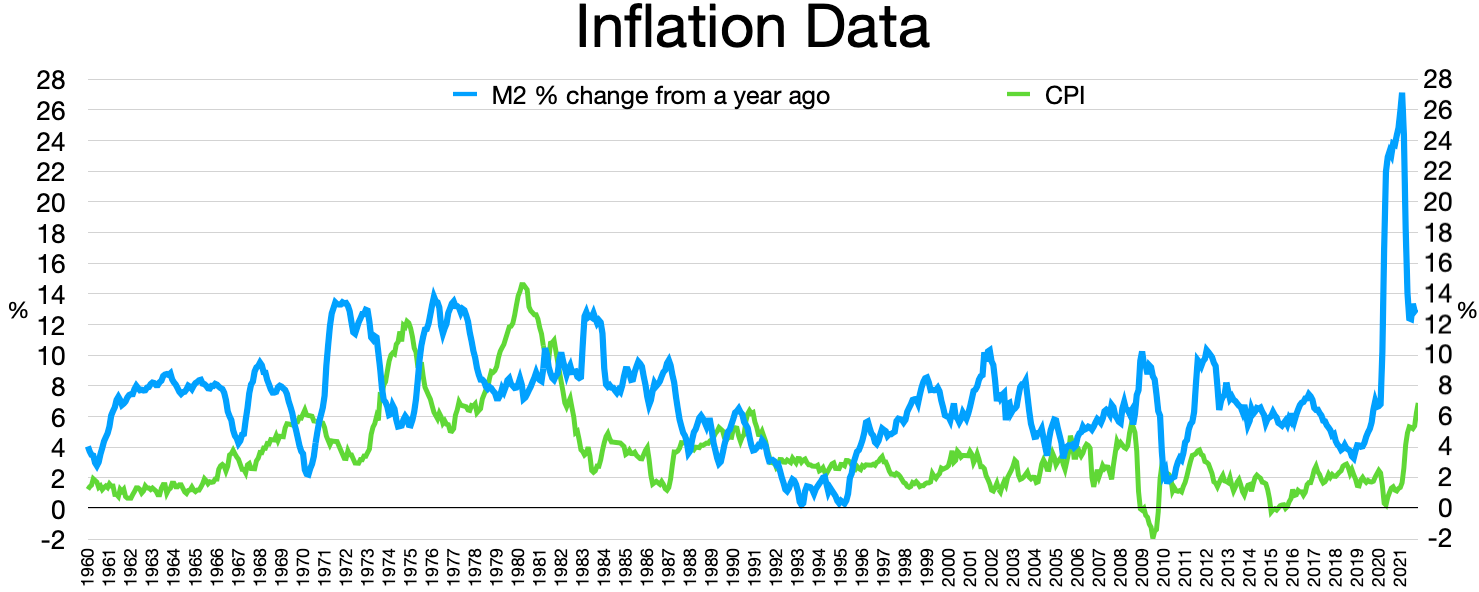
M2 % change from a year ago Consumer price index

When cost-of-living adjustments, negotiated wage settlements, and budgetary increases exceed the CPI, media reports frequently compare the two without considering the relevant tax code. However, CPI is based on the retail pricing of a basket of goods and services. Most purchases from that same basket require the use of after-tax dollars—dollars that were often subject to the highest marginal tax rate. Consequently, the COLA will necessarily have to exceed the CPI inflation rate to maintain purchasing power.

The widely recognized problem known as bracket creep can also occur in countries where the marginal tax brackets themselves are not indexed — COLA increases place more dollars into higher tax rate brackets. Only under a flat tax system would a percentage gain on gross income translate into a comparable inflation-offsetting gain at the after-tax level.

Some salaries and pensions in the United States with a COLA include:

- Social Security
- Civil Service Retirement System (CSRS)
- Federal Employees Retirement System (FERS)

Pensions in Canada with a COLA include:

- Canadian Auto Workers union (CAW) Local 200 (Ontario)

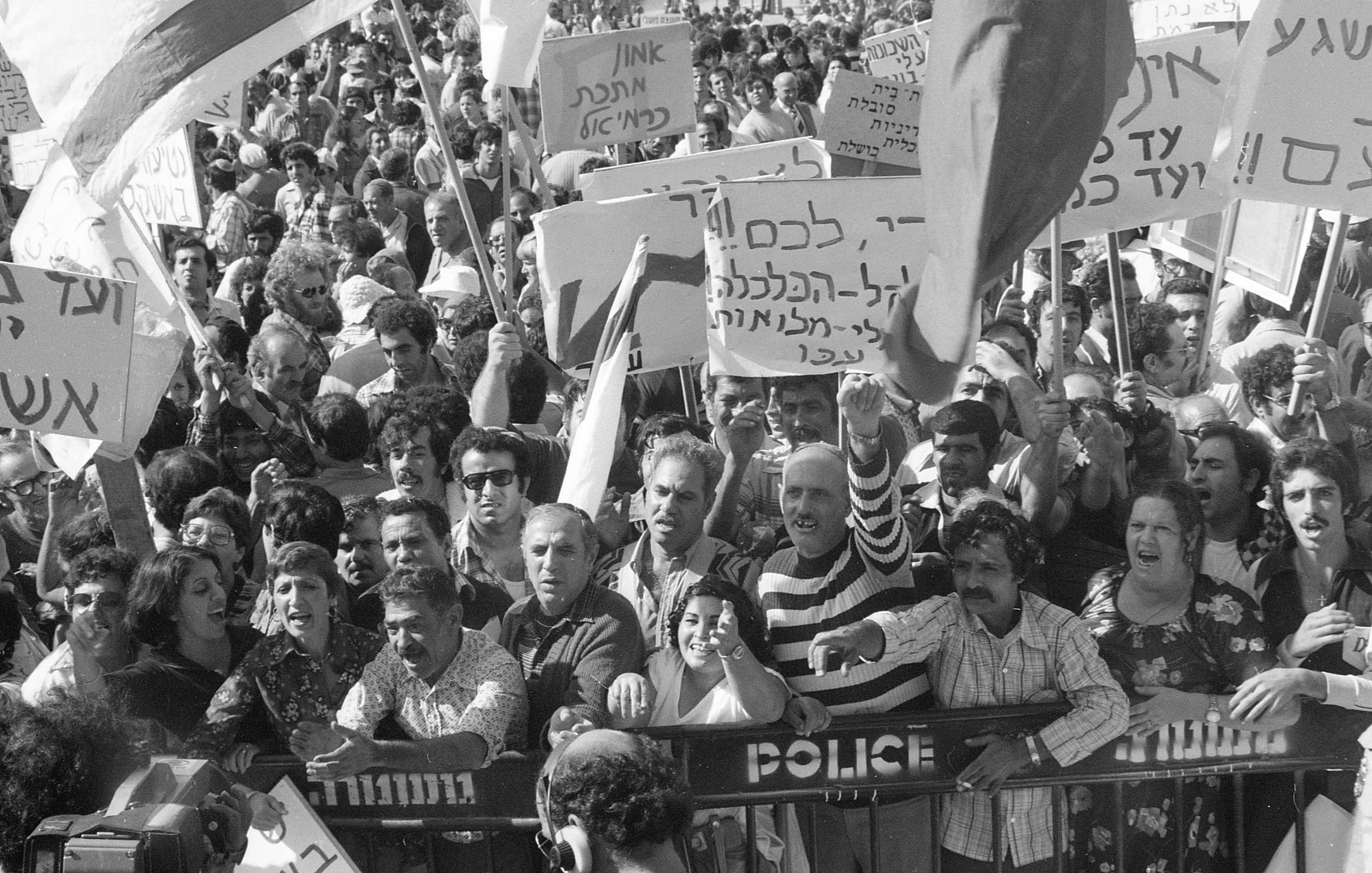
The Histadrut worker's union in Israel holding a cost-of-living protest in 1980

=== United States ===
Social security benefits in the United States receive cost-of-living adjustments (COLAs) to match increases in the Consumer Price Index for Urban Wage Earners and Clerical Workers (CPI-W). They can also receive funds from public charities for specific issues. The COLAs are set annually and are calculated based on the CPI-W value for the third quarter of the year (averaging the values from July, August, and September). COLAs can only increase benefits, so in deflationary years when the CPI-W drops, there is no COLA.

A non-taxable Cost of Living Allowance (U.S. Military) is frequently given to members of the U.S. military stationed at overseas bases if the area to which a service member is assigned has a higher cost of living than the average area in the United States. For example, service members stationed in Japan receive a cost-of-living allowance of between $300 and $700 per month (depending on pay grade, years of service, and number of dependents), in addition to their base pay.

=== Canada ===
Canada's social security system incorporates cost-of-living adjustments (COLA) across multiple federal and provincial programs to maintain the purchasing power of retirement benefits amid inflation. Federal programs include the Old Age Security (OAS) pension, which is adjusted quarterly and increased by 2.0% over the past year. For the January to March 2025 period, OAS showed no increase as the CPI reflected a small dip over the previous three months. The Canada Pension Plan (CPP) benefits will see increases due to cost-of-living adjustments to address rising living costs.

Beyond federal initiatives, provincial and occupational pension plans also implement COLA mechanisms. British Columbia's Municipal Pension Plan applied a 1.6% increase effective January 1, 2025, while Ontario's OPTrust pensions increased by 2.7% for 2025. The Alberta Teachers' Retirement Fund demonstrates variable adjustment rates, with 1.74% for service before 1993 and 2.03% for service after 1993.

COLA calculation methodologies share common features but vary in implementation. Most provincial plans use changes in the Canadian consumer price index (CPI) measured over specific periods. The College Pension Plan bases its 2.6% COLA on "the change in the 12-month average Canadian consumer price index (CPI) up to the end of October 2024 compared to the previous 12-month period". The Alberta Teachers' Fund uses the Alberta Consumer Price Index (ACPI), which is specific to Alberta's economy. For new retirees, COLA is typically pro-rated based on pension receipt duration.

These adjustments significantly impact retirees' long-term financial security. OPTrust illustrates this effect: a $20,000 pension that began in 1995 would grow to $37,313 by 2025—an 87% increase over three decades. While preserving purchasing power remains the primary goal, pension administrators must balance this with sustainability concerns. The College Pension Plan notes that "the plan's ability to provide you a full COLA demonstrates the health of the plan's inflation adjustment account", while the BC Municipal Pension Plan has removed COLA caps through 2025 due to the financial strength of the plan's accounts.

As Canada faces ongoing inflation pressures, these cost-of-living adjustments across federal, provincial, and occupational programs provide crucial protection for retirees, demonstrating Canada's commitment to safeguarding retirement benefits against inflation's erosive effects while maintaining system sustainability.

== See also ==
- Affordable housing – Housing affordable to those with a median household income
- Living wage – Minimum income to meet a worker's basic needs
- ACCRA Cost of Living Index
- Precariat – Class of wage-earners in a tenuous job situation close to unemployment
- United Kingdom cost of living crisis
- United States Consumer Price Index
- List of most expensive cities for expatriate employees
- Middle class squeeze – Decline in middle-class real wages and increase in economic inequality
- Cost of raising a child
- Walk to work protest – Protests that occurred in Uganda in April 2011
- Boots theory – Economic theory by Terry Pratchett
