= Basic Allowance for Housing =

United States military entitlement

Basic allowance for housing (BAH) is a United States military entitlement given to many military members. It was previously called Basic allowance for quarters (BAQ) and is administered by the Defense Travel Management Office (DTMO).

== How it works ==
Basic Allowance for Housing (BAH) is calculated based on several factors, primarily the location of the military member's duty station, their pay grade, and whether they have dependents. BAH rates are determined annually by the Department of Defense and are intended to cover a portion of the housing costs for military personnel. The rates can vary significantly from one location to another, reflecting the cost of living in that area. If the military member has dependents, they typically receive a higher BAH rate to account for their larger housing needs. BAH is not taxable as income.

=== Eligibility factors ===
Basic allowance for housing is given to members so that they can provide housing for themselves and their dependents (usually spouse and children). BAH is given when the member or their dependents do not occupy government quarters or barracks.

BAH is non-taxable money paid on a monthly basis. There are 3 factors for determining the amount of BAH:

1. Marital status – In Britain, this allowance used to be called "marriage allowance" in the 1930s. In the United States, as of 2018, the U.S. military required its members to produce marriage documentation.
2. Pay grade – This is essentially synonymous with rank, the higher the grade, the higher the BAH.
3. Location in the United States – BAH is intended to match the average monthly rent in the area where the member is stationed, thus more expensive regions (they are indexed by zip codes) to live allocate more BAH. Depending on the status of the assignment (such as temporary duty, or an unaccompanied assignment) the BAH may be calculated where the dependents actually reside.
4. Dependents – There are 2 types or BAH, with dependents and without dependents. The rationale behind this is that a single person doesn't need as much room as a couple or a family.

The following do not affect the amount of BAH:

- The number of dependents (a member with a spouse and no children and a spouse and one or several children receive the same amount of BAH).
- The actual amount paid for rent.
- The size of the unit (unlike other calculations like HUD's FMR)

Reservists who are activated, even if they are housed by the military during their mobilization, are still paid BAH on the assumption that a reservist still may have the civilian obligations (like a mortgage) that BAH is designed to offset.

Lastly, veterans who are full-time students taking advantage of the Post 9-11 GI Bill are given an allowance pegged to the BAH with dependents rate for an E-5, irrespective of their rank or dependent status.

A service member who is married makes substantially more allowance money than a single member. Reports of soldiers marrying for the extra pay are not uncommon.

=== Determining allowances ===
Robert D. Niehaus, Inc. (RDN), a private firm based in California is contracted to provide the data used to calculate BAH allowances.

==== Locations ====
Every location in the U.S. has a BAH, including those without a significant military population. Non-military areas are combined with similar priced rental markets based on U.S. Housing and Urban Development (HUD)'s Fair Market Rent (FMR) data, and then use same RDN BAH source data available for similar areas. These comparably priced groups are called "County Cost Groups" (CCGs). There are 39 CCGs in the U.S., consisting of half of all counties (about 1,500) containing less than two percent of the uniformed services' population eligible to receive BAH.

==== Methodology ====
The following data sources are used to determine BAH:

- Current residential vacancies, identified in local newspapers and real estate rental listings
- Telephone interviews
- Yellow page listings of apartments
- Real estate management companies
- Real estate professionals
- Fort/post/base housing referral offices
- On-site evaluations
- Internet research
- Housing data available from other government agencies

==== Timing ====
BAH changes every year, based on data gather during the Summer / Spring active rental seasons. Generally BAH changes 2–5% annually and 5–10% in "hot" markets.

== 2025 BAH Rates ==
BAH rates are updated annually based on rental market surveys conducted during the spring and summer. As of January 1, 2025, rates increased an average of 5.4% nationwide, with larger increases in high-demand military areas.

The following table shows example 2025 BAH rates for select high-population military installations:

2025 BAH Rates (Monthly) - With Dependents
Installation	State	MHA Code	E-4	E-7	O-3
Fort Liberty	NC	NC182	$1,443	$1,773	$2,094
Fort Cavazos	TX	TX286	$1,494	$1,836	$2,169
Joint Base Lewis-McChord	WA	WA606	$2,394	$2,805	$3,150
Camp Pendleton	CA	CA606	$3,186	$3,636	$3,960
Fort Moore	GA	GA075	$1,350	$1,647	$1,941
Naval Station Norfolk	VA	VA107	$1,884	$2,283	$2,658

Additional installation-specific BAH data is available through the Defense Travel Management Office's BAH calculator.

== Housing Cost Analysis ==
BAH rates are designed to cover average rental costs in each Military Housing Area (MHA), though actual housing expenses vary significantly. Service members can optimize their housing budgets by comparing on-base and off-base housing options based on their specific circumstances.

Factors affecting housing decisions include:

- BAH rate vs actual rent - Some markets allow "BAH profit" where rent is below the allowance
- Utilities and fees - Off-base housing may include additional costs not covered by BAH
- Commute distance - On-base housing eliminates commute costs but may have waitlists
- Space and amenities - Quality and size vary between on-base and local rental markets

Military families should compare total housing costs including utilities, commute, and lifestyle preferences when deciding between on-base and off-base housing options.

== OHA ==
Overseas Housing Allowance, or OHA, may be given instead of BAH when a member is stationed outside the United States. BAH and OHA are similar, but have some significant differences. In OHA, each country, and each region in a country have a cap on a per month basis as to what the military will pay for housing. OHA is the exact amount of monthly rent in the local currency (so the exchange rate is taken into consideration each month as the member is paid in US dollars) up to the cap.

OHA may also be paid in certain circumstances if the dependents are living overseas, for example if a member is deployed, and the dependents stay in a country outside of the US.

Frequently a "utility allowance" also accompanies OHA. This is usually a flat rate given to the member to cover the cost of utilities, regardless of the actual amount.

== Acronyms ==
- Basic Housing Allowance (BAH) – The housing subsidy paid to military members.
- Military Housing Areas (MHAs) – Zip codes combine to make rental markets surrounding a duty area of metropolitan region. There are 350 MHAs in the U.S. named for installation of nearest city.
- Military Housing Offices (MHOs) – Local base department involved in BAH.
- County Cost Groups (CCGs) – Comparably priced U.S. rental markets. There are 39 in the U.S.

== See also ==
- Basic Pay
- Leave and Earnings Statement (LES)
- Overseas Housing Allowance (OHA)
