= Cost of Living Allowance (U.S. Military) =

Money given to military personnel

Cost of Living Allowance (COLA) is an entitlement given to military servicemen and women United States military living in high-cost areas or stationed overseas. It is intended to compensate service members for the high cost of living at certain duty stations. COLA is also given to other US government employees living abroad, dependent upon agency.

== Operation ==
The fundamental goal of COLA is to compensate service members for the high cost of living at certain duty stations. COLA rates are based on a service member's pay grade, years of service, and number of dependents.

An area is considered high cost if the cost of living for that area exceeds 108% of that national average of non-housing costs. COLA takes into account the availability of commissary, exchange, and hospital facilities at a specific duty station, because servicemembers without this infrastructure tend to have a higher cost of living. However, not having this infrastructure is not enough in and of itself to qualify an area for COLA. COLA also factors in local taxes, including taxes on such things as privately owned vehicles for a specific duty location in calculating the cost of living in a particular area.

Members will only receive COLA, whether stationed in the United States or abroad, if they are assigned to an area where the cost of living is higher than it would be in an average area in the United States. If the cost of living at the duty station is the same as or lower than the average in the US, they will not receive any COLA.

COLA rates vary from station to station, even within a specific country.

== Calculation ==
The Defense Finance and Accounting Service calculates the cost of living in a particular area by using two surveys: the Living Pattern Survey and a Retail Price Schedule.

The Living Pattern Survey indicates how much service members purchase at on post facilities, and how much they spend off post at local stores. The survey produces an average for a specific area. For example, in a specific area the survey may show that members buy half of their products on post, and half on the local economy. This is only an average and may not apply to all service members within that area.

Using this information and the Retail Price Schedule, shoppers will price 120 goods and services, everything from auto repair to zucchini, to compare their prices with equivalent goods and services in the US. If the overseas costs are higher than in the US, a COLA equal to the difference is paid.

When changes in spending patterns occur because of changes in the exchange rate, the Living Pattern Survey will be updated. The opening/closing of a commissary or an exchange may also prompt an update to the Living Pattern Survey.

== Updating overseas rates ==
The Per Diem Committee in the Defense Finance Accounting Service monitors the exchange rates between local currency and US currency throughout the year. Changes to an area's COLA are made along with changes to the exchange rate to maintain your purchasing power overseas.

The committee adjusts the COLA rate as often as possible and can even adjust it every day. These changes, however, will not have an immediate impact on your paycheck. It takes time for the Department and Defense Finance and Accounting Service to chart currency movements, set the COLA, and then distribute the money via payrolls.

In other words, the COLA rate is always playing catch up with the dollar's movement in value against other currencies. On the reverse side of it, if the dollar rebounds, it will again take some time for service members to see a reduction in their COLA.

In the short term, members may see big fluctuations in the US dollar's buying power. But over time, COLA adjustments will offset those changes and a member's purchasing power will remain steady.

== Updating stateside rates ==
COLA rates for the Continental United States are updated once a year, and changes go into effect January 1 of each year. At that time, an area's COLA may increase or even decrease, based on the changes in the cost of living in the area.

== On-post vs. off-post housing ==
A military serviceperson will receive less COLA if they live on post than they would if they lived off post. This reduction in COLA reflects the lower living expenses. Overseas Housing Allowance, however, is completely independent from COLA and the amount one receives in COLA will not affect one's Overseas Housing Allowance.

== Taxation ==
Overseas COLA is a non-taxable allowance. Stateside COLA, however, is taxed. To offset these taxes, these COLA rates incorporate an 18% increase to cover the average income tax.

== See also ==
- Basic pay
- Leave and Earnings Statement (LES)
