= Defense Language Proficiency Tests =

Foreign language proficiency tests used by the US DoD

The Defense Language Proficiency Test (DLPT) is a battery of foreign language tests produced by the Defense Language Institute and used by the United States Department of Defense (DoD). They are intended to assess the general language proficiency of native English speakers in a specific foreign language, in the skills of reading and listening. An Oral Proficiency Interview (OPI) is sometimes administered to Defense Language Institute students to establish the graduate's proficiency in speaking following training there, but it is not part of the DLPT.

== Description ==
The tests are meant to measure how well a person can function in real-life situations in a foreign language according to well-defined linguistic tasks and assessment criteria. Originally paper tests, they are increasingly delivered by computer.

The tests are used to assess the skill level of DoD linguists. Linguists are tested once a year in the skills of reading and listening. Test scores determine the amount of Foreign Language Proficiency Pay (FLPP) that a military linguist receives, and also whether they are qualified for certain positions that require language aptitude. DLPT scores may also figure into the readiness rating of a military linguist unit.

Scoring for the current (2007) series of tests, called DLPT5, is, like that for their predecessors, based on the guidelines of the Interagency Language Roundtable (ILR), with the test results stated as levels 0+ through 3 or up to 4 for some languages.

Military language analysts are required to maintain a L2/R2 proficiency. Exams are administered annually, normally immediately after language upkeep classes, and can be taken as often as every 6 months without a language refresher course. In order to receive extra pay, they must exceed the minimum score for that language in one or more categories without falling below the minimum in either. For example:

Listening	Reading	FLPP (Monthly)
2	2	$200
1	2+	$0
2	2+	$250
2+	2+	$300
and so forth

Each service maintains independent FLPP rates, which vary based on the difficulty of the language, the number of speakers of that language in the service, and the needs of the service. FLPP is awarded in addition to base pay, other pay, and is subject to taxation, except within a war zone.

DLI students, regardless of their course grades, may not graduate without achieving an L2/R2 on the DLPT. They must also pass a series of tests called FLO (Final Learning Objective) Tests, as well as achieve a minimum of 1+ on the OPI. Although there is a minimum standard for DLI graduation, military language analysts are not required to maintain speaking proficiency unless required in the performance of duties.

Because of the subjective wording of the distractors (i.e., the "wrong" answers), the fact that many individuals take versions of the test numerous times and acquire a feel for its peculiarities while others lack that advantage, and the fact that it was not nearly challenging enough, the status of the DLPT IV as a proficiency test was controversial. These are among the reasons why the DLPT5 was instated, with an emphasis on incorporating "authentic materials". The intention of the DLPT5 was to provide a more accurate idea of how proficient the test taker was; whether it accurately assesses proficiency is as much (or even more so) a source of controversy as with the previous version. Because the net effect on military linguists was an average drop of about half a point of proficiency across all skills and all languages, many believe that the new version was intended to be a cost saving measure by reducing FLPP.

While the format of previous DLPTs was consistent across languages, there are two distinct formats of the DLPT5—multiple choice (in Russian, Chinese, MSA, and others) and constructed response (in some of the so-called "Less Commonly Taught Languages" like Hindi and Albanian).

DLPT5 was initially slated to be a computer-based test, but during that version's infancy, it was proctored much like the previous exams, using scantron sheets, taped media, and test booklets. DLPT5 was taken in conjunction with DLPT IV during the trial stage of that version, and has since usurped it as the standard test. Although some versions, such as those given to linguists in the field, abroad, or in other extraordinary situations, are still paper tests, the CONUS facilities which house linguists use the computer proctored exams.

DLPT is used to measure both government and military proficiency in the United States, whereas the ACTFL proficiency test is used in academic circles. Below is an equivalency chart:

ACTFL	DLPT
Novice – Low	0
Novice – Mid	0/0+
Novice – High	0+
Intermediate – Low	1
Intermediate – Mid	1
Intermediate – High	1+
Advanced	2
Advanced – Plus	2+
Superior	3 and above

== See also ==
- Defense Language Aptitude Battery
- Defense Language Institute
- Foreign Language Proficiency Pay
- Defense Language Office
- List of language proficiency tests
