= Foreign Language Proficiency Pay =

Foreign Language Proficiency Bonus (FLPB) is a special pay given to members of the United States Military who demonstrate proficiency in one or more foreign languages and is regulated by 37 United States Code Section 353(b) and DoD Instruction 1340.27. Military Foreign Language Skill Proficiency Bonuses. FLPB is one of the skill proficiency bonuses under 37 U.S.C. Section 353(b). Also, consult Chapter 19 of Volume 7A of the DoD Financial Management Regulations (because this chapter is updated more frequently than the DoD Instruction). Foreign Language Proficiency Pay (FLPP) for military was changed to FLPB in 2006; it is usually pronounced "Flip Pay." If referring to FLPP after 2006, one is referring to DoD Civilian FLPP, not the military FLPB. By receiving FLPB, a member agrees that they are available wherever and whenever they are needed by the military for the purpose of their language skills.

== Payment ==
FLPB is usually paid on a monthly, bonus basis (installments), but may be paid an annual, lump sum bonuses. The amount of bonus varies based on the category (payment list) of the language, the level of demonstrated proficiency, and possibly the member's occupation (Army or Marine Corps MOS, Air Force Specialty Code (AFSC) or Navy Enlisted Classification (NEC) Code]). The lowest payment is $100 per month. By law, 37 U.S.C. Section 353(b), the Services are authorized to pay up to $1,000 per month per member for FLPB, depending on the number of languages proficient at, and the skill level demonstrated on the DLPT. They are also authorized to pay out an annual lump sum (max $12,000) instead of monthly payments, but not required.

National Guard Service Members are coded for recurring FLPB payments through their home state USPFO and receive the same total entitlement as Active Duty Service Members. This entitlement is pro-rated only if the Service Member earns fewer than 50 retirement points during the certification period. There is no requirement that individuals perform duty during the month that the entitlement is paid.

== Eligible Languages and Ratings ==
Eligible languages are updated annually in a memo put out by the U.S. government. These languages are listed on the Strategic Languages List (SLL) and categorized by payment list A (Immediate Investment languages), payment list B (SLL Stronghold languages), and payment list C. Languages that are considered "dominant in the force" are not eligible for FLPP unless the servicemember is in a linguist-position job (as with French, Spanish, Portuguese—Brazilian and European, Tagalog, and German). Many other languages are eligible for FLPP regardless of the member's jobs or language use in their jobs.

== Demonstrated Proficiency ==
Proficiency is demonstrated via the Defense Language Proficiency Test (DLPT). Typically, a score of 2/2/1+ (2 in listening, a 2 in reading, and a 1+ in speaking) is the minimum to receive the payment. The member must retest each year to continue receiving the payment.

To be paid FLPP a service member's orders must state the service members' eligibility for this entitlement.

== See also ==
- United States military pay
- Defense Language Institute
- Defense Language Proficiency Tests
