= ILR scale =

Descriptions of abilities to communicate in a language

The Interagency Language Roundtable scale is a set of descriptions of abilities to communicate in a language. It is the standard grading scale for language proficiency in the United States's federal-level service. It was originally developed by the Interagency Language Roundtable (ILR), which included representatives of the U.S. Foreign Service Institute, based at the National Foreign Affairs Training Center (NFATC).

The scale grades people's language proficiency on a scale of 0–5. The designation 0+, 1+, 2+, 3+, or 4+ is assigned by most agencies when proficiency substantially exceeds one skill level but does not fully meet the criteria for the next level. The exception is the DLIELC (Defense Language Institute English Language Center), which assigns a + designation for failure/inconsistency at the next higher level.

Grades may be assigned separately for different skills such as reading, speaking, listening, writing, translation, audio translation, interpretation, and intercultural communication. For some of these skills, the level may be referred to with an abbreviation, for example, S-1 for Speaking Level 1.

== ILR scale ==
=== ILR Level 0 – No proficiency ===
No communicative ability. Possibly able to speak a few isolated words.

=== ILR Level 0+ – Memorized proficiency ===
A person who can satisfy their immediate needs using memorized phrases is rated 0+ on the scale. The following describes the traits of an ILR Level 0+ individual:

- may be able to ask questions or make statements with reasonable accuracy only with memorized utterances or formulae
- unable to read connected prose but may be able to read numbers, isolated words and phrases, personal and place names, street signs, office and shop designations
- understanding limited to occasional isolated words or memorized utterances in areas of immediate needs.
- may be able to produce symbols in an alphabetic or syllabic writing system or 50 of the most common characters

=== ILR Level 1 – Elementary proficiency ===
Elementary proficiency is rated 1 on the scale. The following describes the traits of an ILR Level 1 individual:

- can fulfill traveling needs and conduct themselves in a polite manner
- able to use questions and answers for simple topics within a limited level of experience; the native speaker must strain and leverage contextual knowledge to understand what is said
- able to understand basic questions and speech, which allows for guides, such as slower speech or repetition, to aid understanding
- has a vocabulary only large enough to communicate the most basic of needs
- writes in simple sentences or sentence fragments with continual spelling and grammar errors

The majority of individuals classified as Level 1 are able to perform most basic functions using the language; this includes buying goods, reading the time, ordering simple meals and asking for minimal directions

=== ILR Level 2 – Limited working proficiency ===
Limited working proficiency is rated 2 on the scale. A person at this level is described as follows:

- able to satisfy routine social demands and limited work requirements
- can handle with confidence most basic social situations including introductions and casual conversations about current events, work, family, and autobiographical information
- can handle limited work requirements, needing help in handling any complications or difficulties; can get the gist of most conversations on non-technical subjects (i.e. topics which require no specialized knowledge), and has a speaking vocabulary sufficient to respond simply with some circumlocutions
- has an accent which, though often quite faulty, is intelligible
- can usually handle elementary constructions quite accurately but does not have thorough or confident control of the grammar

=== ILR Level 3 – Professional working proficiency ===
Professional working proficiency is rated 3 on the scale. Level 3 is what is usually used to measure how many people in the world know a given language. A person at this level is described as follows:

- able to speak the language with sufficient structural accuracy and vocabulary to participate effectively in most conversations on practical, social, and professional topics
- can discuss particular interests and special fields of competence with reasonable ease
- has comprehension which is quite complete for a normal rate of speech
- has a general vocabulary which is broad enough that searching for a word has become a seldom phenomenon
- has an accent which may be obviously foreign; has a good control of grammar; and whose errors virtually never interfere with understanding and rarely disturb the native speaker

Individuals classified at level 3 are able to use the language as part of normal professional duties and can reliably elicit information and informed opinion from native speakers; examples include answering objections, clarifying points, stating and defending policy, conducting meetings, and reading with almost complete comprehension a variety of prose material on familiar and unfamiliar topics such as news reports, routine correspondence, and technical material in trained fields of competence.

=== ILR Level 4 – Full professional proficiency ===
Full professional proficiency is rated 4 on the ILR scale. A person rated at this level should have the following characteristics:

- able to use the language fluently and accurately on all levels and as normally pertinent to professional needs
- can understand and participate in any conversations within the range of own personal and professional experience with a high degree of fluency and precision of vocabulary
- would rarely be taken for a native speaker, but can respond appropriately even in unfamiliar grounds or situations
- makes only quite rare and minor errors of pronunciation and grammar
- can handle informal interpreting of the language

Individuals classified at level 4 are able to understand the details and ramifications of concepts that are culturally or conceptually different from their own language and can set the tone of interpersonal official, semi-official and non-professional verbal exchanges with a representative range of native speakers; examples include playing an effective role among native speakers in contexts such as conferences, lectures and debates on matters of disagreement, as well as advocating a position at length. While proficiency may match that of an educated native speaker, the individual is not necessarily perceived as culturally native due to occasional weaknesses in idioms, colloquialisms, slang, and cultural references.

=== ILR Level 5 – Native or bilingual proficiency ===
Native or bilingual proficiency is rated 5 on the scale. A person at this level is described as follows:

- has a speaking proficiency equivalent to that of an educated native speaker
- has complete fluency in the language, such that speech on all levels is fully accepted by educated native speakers in all of its features, including breadth of vocabulary and idiom, colloquialisms, and pertinent cultural references

== Equivalence with the European language proficiency scale CEFR ==
A table published by the American University Center of Provence gave the following correspondences between the ILR, the European language proficiency scale CEFR, and the proficiency scale of the American Council on the Teaching of Foreign Languages (ACTFL):

CEFR	ILR	ACTFL
A2	1	IL, IM
B1	1+	IH
B2	2/2+	AL, AM, AH
C1	3/3+	S

A 2012 study had 88 participants over the range of CEFR levels take both a CEFR and an ILR-based exam, and arrived at a relationship between CEFR, ILR, and ACTFL in the following table.

CEFR	ILR	ACTFL
A2	1/1+	IM
B1	2	AL
B2	2+	AM
C1	3	S

The Chartered Institute of Linguists presents the following equivalents between the ILR and CEFR scales:

CEFR	ILR
A1	0/0+
A2	1/1+
B1	2/2+
B2	3/3+
C1	4/4+
C2	5

== See also ==
- List of language proficiency tests
- Assessment of Basic Language and Learning Skills
- Common European Framework of Reference for Languages, the European language-proficiency scale
- Defense Language Proficiency Tests
- Interagency Language Roundtable
- Second language
- Second-language acquisition
- Studies in Language Testing (SiLT)
- Task-based language learning
- Wikipedia:Babel (originating at Commons:Babel), a similar, though informal, 0–5 language scale
