= Housing stress =

Housing stress describes a situation where the cost of housing (either as rental, or as a mortgage) is high relative to household income. It may also be used to describe inadequate housing for a proportion of the population.

As a rule of thumb, a household spending 30 percent or more of its income can be considered under housing stress, and under "extreme" housing stress if spending exceeds 50 percent. Other studies may apply a different threshold, or restrict its definition to households with below average income. The Economic Research Service of the United States Department of Agriculture classifies counties as under housing stress" if 30 percent or more of its housing units meets one or more of the following criteria: lacked complete plumbing, lacked complete kitchens, paid 30 per cent or more for owner costs or rent, or had more than one person per room.

== Definition ==
Housing stress describes financial hardship caused by housing expenses. More specifically, it may be described as "housing-induced financial stress." Although housing stress can be stressful, the phenomenon is economic and unrelated to psychological stress. In general, a household that struggles to or is unable to meet their basic needs after housing expenses is said to be under housing stress.

Housing stress primarily affects households in the bottom 40% income bracket, or the "working poor." However, the phenomenon extends beyond the working poor and is increasingly affecting the middle class as well. A number of other groups may be prone to suffering from housing stress, including couples with many dependents, people suffering from illness, those who have lost money following a crash in the real estate market, those who lack insurance, the elderly, students and those who are unemployed.

== Measurement ==
Housing stress can be used as a benchmark to measure affordability. In general, housing stress describes the amount one's housing expenses cut into the income they have available to cover the rest of their expenses. One concrete way of measuring housing stress is using the concept of "residual income," which is to say, how much income a household has leftover after covering housing expenses.

A rule of thumb is commonly used in measuring housing affordability. Internationally, it's common to say a household is under financial stress if 30% or more of its income is being spent on housing costs. This 30% rule of thumb is considered to be a conservative estimate. In the United States, the affordability ratio, or the ratio of housing expenses to all other expenses required for housing to be considered affordable, was widely believed to be 25% up to the 1980s. The 30% rule was adopted subsequently. Australia uses the same 30% rule in addition to the 30/40 rule, which is stricter. The 30/40 rule measures housing affordability more generally, suggesting that housing is affordable if it can be afforded by people in the lowest 40% income bracket using only 30% of the household's pretax income.

== See also ==
- Cost of living
- Downshifting
- Lying flat
- Quarter-life crisis
- Standard of living
- Tasmanian House
