= Leave and earnings statement =

US military payroll record

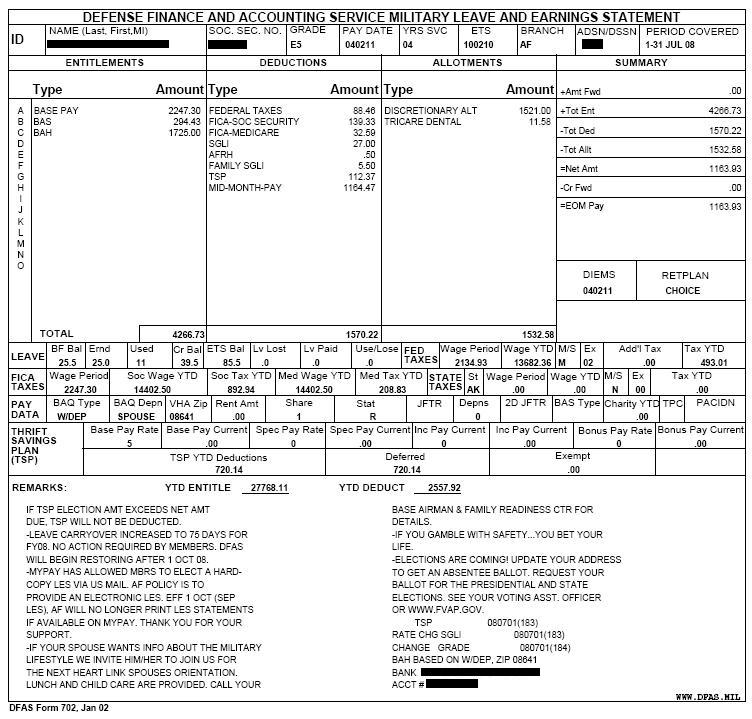
Example of an LES

A Leave and Earnings Statement, generally referred to as an LES, is a document given on a monthly basis to members of the United States military which documents their pay and leave status on a monthly basis.

Employees in the civil service receive a similar document each pay period, called a Civilian Leave and Earnings Statement, a link to which the Defense Finance and Accounting Service emails two days prior to the scheduled pay day.

== Delivery ==
While paper LES documents were originally mailed or handed out in person, it is now almost always retrieved by the member from an online system called myPay from the Defense Finance and Accounting Service. For United States Coast Guard personnel LES can be retrieved by the member from an online system called Direct Access that is controlled by U.S. Coast Guard Personnel Services Command.

== Sections ==
There are multiple sections to an LES.

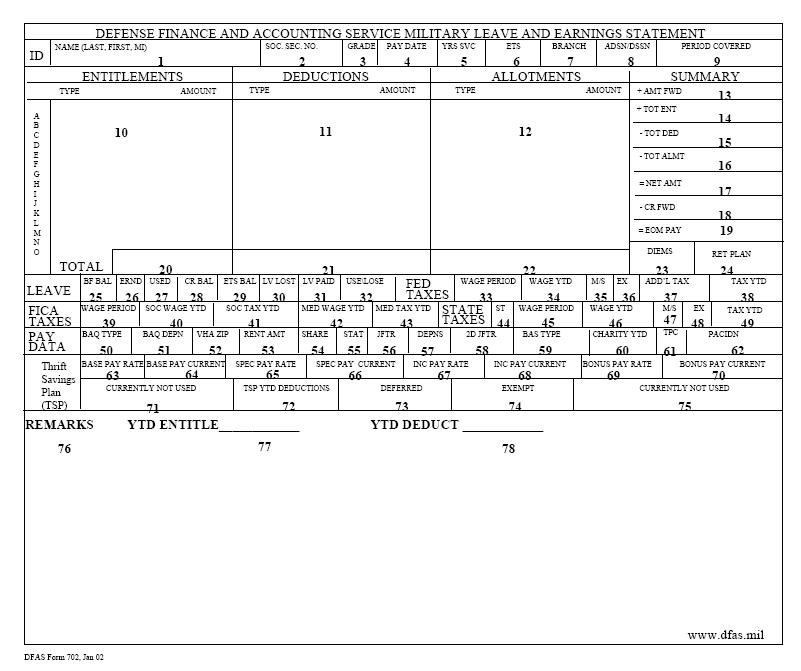

=== Pay ===
The first section lists the monetary entitlements that month. For all members it consists of Basic Pay, and for many members it also includes Basic Allowance for Housing and Basic Allowance for Subsistence. Other kinds of pay including Cost of Living Allowance, Overseas Housing Allowance, incentive pay, bonus pay, or hazardous duty pay may be included.

Per diem and TDY money are usually not included in the LES.

=== Deductions ===
The second section describes the money that has been deducted. Common deductions include:

- Federal and state taxes
- Social Security
- Servicemembers' Group Life Insurance (SGLI) (if the member is a participant)
- Montgomery GI Bill deduction for the first year (if the member is a participant)
- The service retirement center
- Thrift Savings Plan (TSP) (if the member is a participant)
- Mid month pay
  - Most members receive their money two times per month, on the 15th of the month (known as mid month pay) and on the 1st of the following month (known as end of month pay). The mid month pay is also listed in the deductions section.

=== Allotments ===
Common allotments include:

- Bank account
  - Savings
  - Checking
  - Loan payment (car, etc.)
- TRICARE premiums
- Combined Federal Campaign (CFC) contributions
- Service relief societies (i.e.: Navy-Marine Corps Relief Society, Air Force Aid Society, etc.)

=== End of Month Pay ===
After all the pay is added, all deductions & allotments are subtracted, and loose ends from previous months are accounted for, what is left is the end of month pay, which is indicated on the far right.

=== Leave ===
Military members accumulate 2.5 days of leave per month or 30 days per year. The maximum amount of leave that can accrue is 60 days (this can be more if a member was deployed within the year). The fiscal year ends on September 30, unless Congress decides to change it temporarily.

- BF Bal - Brought forward leave balance. This is the unused leave rolled over from the last fiscal year.
- Ernd - The cumulative amount of leave earned in the current fiscal year, or current term of service if the service member re-enlisted or extended since the start of the fiscal year.
- Used - The cumulative amount of leave used during the current fiscal year, or term of enlistment.
- Cr Bal - The current leave balance as of the end of the period covered by the LES. It is calculated by BF BAL + ERNED - USED.
- ETS Bal - The projected leave available through the current Expiration Term of Service. This helps make appropriate plans if the member does not plan to re-enlist.
- LV Lost - The amount of leave that has been lost, usually because of having too high a balance at the end of the fiscal year.
- LV Paid - The number of days of leave for which you have been paid to date.
- Use/Lose - The projected number of days of leave that will be lost if not taken on in the current fiscal year on a monthly basis. The number of days of leave in this block will decrease with any leave usage.

=== TSP ===
TSP information is listed near the bottom, along with the YTD (calendar year) total tax withholdings.

== See also ==
- United States Military Pay
