= National Language Service Corps =

The National Language Service Corps (NLSC) is a US civilian corps of multilingual volunteers who are readily available to serve the American federal government by providing foreign language services as required. NLSC Members use their language skills to facilitate communications with other speakers of their language and to serve as a bridge to their community and the federal government. To date, members have supported the government in assignments that have included interpretation, translation as well as providing cultural and regional knowledge and expertise to government agencies.

The mission of the NLSC is to maintain an available group of on-call language-capable members who provide support to requesting federal agencies. Membership is offered to US citizens who are at least 18 years old and fluent in English and another language. As part of the enrollment process, applicants seeking NLSC membership certify their language skills by self-assessing their speaking, reading, listening and writing abilities. Formal language proficiency certification is determined by the NLSC. As a general rule, NLSC Members possess professional working proficiency rating at a Level 3 or higher on the Interagency Language Roundtable (ILR) scale.

When an NLSC Member is selected to assist federal agencies with their language requirements, they do so as short term temporary federal employees. The NLSC does not offer full-time federal employment to members. The NLSC is an invaluable resource for federal agencies and provides a cost-effective solution that addresses surge requirements, contingency plans and language gaps within the organization’s workforce. Members are a part of a unique network of multilingual speakers and a first-of-its kind organization that values language skills, diversity, and culture. NLSC Members network face-to-face at meet & greet functions and chapter meetings throughout the year. Members also have exclusive access to members-only Facebook groups and a members-only virtual platform that provide access to language sustainment training resources and other Members-only materials. Members are required to renew their membership every four years.

The NLSC’s membership currently is over 9,300 member volunteers, and growing, representing over 410 languages. The NLSC is an authorized Department of Defense program through the National Defense Authorization Act for Fiscal Year 2013 (NDAA 13), is administered by the Defense Language and National Security Education Office (DLNSEO), and is one of nine initiatives within DLNSEO.

== Background ==
The following legislative history depicts the sequence of events in the years that established the NLSC:

- 2002: Section 325 of Public Law 107-306 (Intelligence Authorization Act for Fiscal Year 2003) directed the Secretary of Defense, acting through the Director of the National Security Education Program (NSEP) to prepare a Feasibility Study on the Civilian Linguist Reserve Corps (CLRC).
- 2004: DoD/National Security Education Program (NSEP) delivers the Feasibility Study
- "Intelligence Authorization Act of 2005 (P.L. 108-487, Sec. 613)" (PDF). gpo.gov. 2005. Authorizes and funds 3-Year CLRC pilot project.
- 2005: DoD incorporates concept into Language Transformation Roadmap and Quadrennial Defense Review.
- 2006: CLRC adopted as major component of President's National Language Security Initiative announced in January.
- 2006: Congress transferred administration of CLRC to DoD in P.L. 109-364, Sec. 944.
- 2007: DoD/NSEP awarded contract to General Dynamics Information Technology in April to implement the NLSC Pilot, formerly the CLRC, as authorized and funded by the John Warner National Defense Authorization Act for Fiscal Year 2007 (P.L. 109-364, Sec. 944).
- 2013: The President of the United States signed the National Defense Authorization Act for Fiscal Year 2013 (H.R. 4310, Sec. 954), which authorized the Secretary of Defense to establish the NLSC as a permanent program.
- 2015: The Department of Defense (DoD) published DoD Instruction 1110.02, National Language Service Corps (NLSC) which formally established the NLSC as a permanent program and implements the responsibilities of the Secretary of Defense in Section 1913 of Title 50 of the United States Code.
- 2016: Part 251 of Title 32 of the United States Code of Federal Regulations became effective on January 11, 2016, providing guidance for the NLSC to support not only DoD, but any department or agency of the United States.

== See also ==
- National Security Language Initiative
- National Security Education Program
- Interagency Language Roundtable scale
