= Individualised Learner Record =

Data collection

The Individualised Learner Record (ILR) is the primary data collection about further education and work-based learning in England. It is requested from learning providers in England's further education system. The data is used widely, most notably by the government to monitor policy implementation and the performance of the sector, and by organisations that allocate FE funding.

ILR data is collected from providers receiving funding from the Education and Skills Funding Agency (ESFA). Data collected within the ILR also feeds into the Personalised Learner Record (PLR), an online record of a learner's qualifications which is accessible to the learner and subsequent institutions that they enrol at. In October 2019, the official statistics released by the Department for Education indicated it controlled over 28.4 million named, individual records.

== Specification ==
The ILR Specification defines the data is collected in the Individualised Learner Record for each academic year (from 1 August to 31 July).

== Controversy ==
In January 2020, the Sunday Times reported that "Betting companies have been given access to an educational database containing names, ages and addresses of 28 million children and students in one of the biggest breaches of government data", which referred to Learner Records Service data. It said that over 12,000 organisations had access to the Learning Records Service.
