= Interagency Language Roundtable =

US Government organization on foreign languages

Agency overview
- Formed: 1955
- Employees: 10 officers
- Agency executive: Scott McGinnis, ILR Coordinator & Chief, Steering Committee
- Website: www.govtilr.org/

The Interagency Language Roundtable (ILR) is an unfunded organization comprising various agencies of the United States federal government with the purpose of coordinating and sharing information on foreign language activities at the federal level.

The ILR's primary function is to act as an avenue for the varying participating federal agencies to keep abreast of modern methods and technology regarding the teaching of language, the use of language, and any other language related issues.

== Membership ==
The ILR membership consists of a large number of people with professional interest in language with regards to the teaching, learning, or use of language in a professional context. About 60% of the membership are federal employees.

Regularly Attending Entities
| Government Agencies and Offices | Academic Organizations, Proprietary Institutions and Other NGOs |
|---|---|
| Administrative Office of the United States Courts; Arlington County Schools; Bureau of the Census; Coast Guard; Department of Commerce; Department of Defense/Office of the Secretary of Defense (DOD/OSD); DOD: Army Foreign Language Program; DOD: Defense Intelligence Agency; DOD: Defense Language Institute Foreign Language Center (DLIFLC); DOD: Defense Language Institute-Washington; DOD: Defense Language Office; DOD: DLI English Language Center; DOD: Office of the Undersecretary of Defense-Personnel and Readiness; DOD: U.S. Army Foreign area officer Program; Department of Education; Department of Health & Human Services; Department of Homeland Security; Department of Justice: Executive Office for Immigration Review; Department of Justice: Language Services; Department of State Foreign Service Institute; Department of State Office of Language Services; District of Columbia Courts; Fairfax County Schools; Federal Bureau of Investigation; Government Accountability Office; Intelligence Language Institute; Library of Congress; National Cryptologic School; National Institutes of Health; National Security Agency; National Security Education Program; National Virtual Translation Center; Office of the Director of National Intelligence; Peace Corps; Postal Service; Secret Service; Voice of America | ALTA Language Services; American Council on Education; American Council of Teachers of Russian; American Council of Learned Societies; American Council on the Teaching of Foreign Languages; American Translators Association; ASET International Services; Association of Proprietary Language Schools; Center for Advanced Study of Language; Center for Applied Linguistics; Center for Naval Analyses; Coalition for International Education; Comprehensive Language Center; Council for International Exchange of Scholars; Diplomatic Language Services; East Coast Organization of Language Testers; George Washington University; Georgetown University; Howard County Community College; Howard University; ICA Language Services; International Center for Language Studies; InLingua School; Institute of International Education; InterGalaxSystems, Ltd.; Joint National Committee for Languages; Language Learning Enterprises; Linguistic Data Consortium; Linguistic Society of America; McNeill Technologies; MITRE Corporation; Modern Language Association; National Capital Language Resource Center; National Foreign Language Center; National Language Museum; San Diego State University; SCOLA; Second Language Testing; Transparent Language; University of Maryland University College; University of Maryland College Park; University of Virginia; Washington Language Center; World Bank |

=== Committees ===
Aside from general membership, the ILR has three standing special interests committees:

- Steering Committee
  - The Steering committee is responsible for planning ILR direction and events, and is composed of members from eight different federal agencies.
- Testing Committee
- Training Committee
- Translation and Interpretation Committee.

Committees are chaired by federal employees from five different agencies.

Additionally, the ILR hosts the ILR Special Interest Group (SIG) on the Center for Advanced Study of Language (CASL). CASL SIG meetings, unlike ILR plenary meetings, are not open to general membership, allowing only federal representatives in attendance.

=== Joining the ILR ===
Any interested person may attend unrestricted ILR plenary meetings and events, requiring only two days' advance registration via the ILR home page. To become an ILR member, a person must first join their mailing list. Joining a specific committee requires only notifying a co-chair of the committee involved, and regularly attending meetings. Further details are listed on the ILR website. Membership is free.

=== Meetings ===
Plenary meetings are held monthly between September and June. Lectures and demonstrations on linguistic general interest topics are featured at every plenary meeting. Prior to each plenary meeting, each committee meets to discuss specific topics of interest. Some committee meetings are not open to general membership, due to coverage of certain topics of federal interest. These meetings' attendance restrictions are announced in advance.

Most plenary meetings boast between 75 and 100 attendees.

=== Officers ===
All officers of the ILR are volunteers who hold full-time federal positions elsewhere.

Current Officers
| Office | Officer |
|---|---|
| ILR Coordinator and Chair of the Steering Committee | Dr. Scott McGinnis |
| Co-chair, Testing Committee | Christina Hoffman |
| Co-chair, Testing Committee | Inna Sabia |
| Co-chair, Training Committee | Doug Gilzow |
| Co-chair, Training Committee | John Samaha |
| Co-chair, Translation and Interpretation Committee | Maria Brau |
| Co-chair, Translation and Interpretation Committee | Teresa Salazar |
| Co-chair, Culture Committee | Allison Greene-Sands |
| Co-chair, Culture Committee | Ewa Zeoli |
| Co-chair, UARC SIG | Marsha Kaplan |
| Co-chair, UARC SIG | Stephanie Stauffer |
| Webmaster | Dr. Bogdan B. Sagatov |

The Foreign Service Institute, the National Cryptologic School, and the Defense Language Institute lend additional minor clerical assistance.

== Formation ==
The origins of the ILR can be traced back to 1955, when the Foreign Service Institute's Howard Sollenberger, the CIA's Clyde Sargent, and James Frith of the Air Force Language Program, conversed regarding the need for communication and coordination between federal agencies in training, policies, and practices of foreign languages.

Subsequent meetings included attendance by members of the local academic community as well as Charles Ferguson, Director of the Center for Applied Linguistics.

The ILR was formally institutionalized in 1973, after a study conducted by the General Accounting Office demonstrated the value of the organization.

== Contributions to the field of linguistics ==
Since the 1950s, the ILR has made a number of contributions to the field of linguistics, both for American and foreign linguists, including, but not limited to:

- ILR Proficiency Level Descriptions – This is a system of measuring the language proficiency of an individual, on a scale of 0 to 5. Proficiency level of 0 equates to no knowledge of a language, while the proficiency level of 5 equates to a highly educated foreigner or native speaker. Proficiency levels in excess of a whole number, but not reaching the next whole number are represented with the 'plus' sign, for example, a linguist who speaks at a near native level might be represented as having a 4+ level proficiency.
- ILR Translation Performance Skill Level Descriptions – Translation proficiency measurements based on the ILR Proficiency Level Descriptions, developed in 2005.
- ILR Interpretation Performance Skill Level Descriptions – Interpretation proficiency measurements based on the ILR Translation Performance Skill Level Descriptions, developed in 2006.
- Co-sponsorship with the National Virtual Translation Center of the "Languages of the World" website.
- The development of a widely used interagency training manual for oral proficiency testing candidates.

== See also ==
- Defense Language Aptitude Battery
- Defense Language Proficiency Tests
- Center for Advanced Study of Language
- ILR scale
