= United States military pay =

Money paid to members of the US military

United States military pay is money paid to members of the United States Armed Forces. The amount of pay varies according to the member's rank, time in the military, location duty assignment, and by some special skills the member may have.

Pay will be largely based on rank, which goes from E-1 to E-9 for enlisted members, O-1 to O-10 for commissioned officers and W-1 to W-5 for warrant officers. Commissioned and warrant officers will be paid more than their enlisted counterparts. Early pay grade promotions are quite frequent, but promotions past E-4 will be less frequent.

== Pay versus allowances ==
There are two broad categories of military pay: "pay" and "allowances". Typically, pay is money which is based upon remuneration for employment, while allowances are money necessary for the efficient performance of duty. Generally speaking, pay is income, while allowances are reimbursement. In the landmark case Jones v. The United States, the United States Court of Claims decided that military allowances are not "of a compensatory character" and "not income as well". Since it was determined that allowances are not income, they cannot be taxed, divided, or garnished, while pay can be. (42 USC 659, et seq.)

== Method of pay ==
Typically members are paid on the 1st and 15th day of each month. If the 1st or 15th of the month falls on a Saturday, Sunday, or federal holiday the member is paid the first business day before. The monthly pay statement is known as a "Leave and Earnings Statement" (LES), which is usually available near the end of each month. The money is directly deposited into a member's personal banking account. The payment on the 15th is known as "mid month pay", and the pay on the 1st is "end of month pay". (End of month pay used to fall on the last day of the month, but in 1986 was moved one day to the first to save money in a fiscal year.)

== Major components ==
There are a few components which most military members receive.

=== Basic pay ===
Also known as "base pay", this is given to members of the active duty military on a monthly basis and is determined by their rank (or more appropriately their pay grade) and their length of time in military service. Basic pay is the same for all the services.

37 USC 1009 provides a permanent formula for an automatic annual military pay raise that indexes the raise to the annual increase in the Employment Cost Index (ECI). The fiscal year 2010 president's budget request for a 2.9% military pay raise was consistent with this formula. However, Congress, in fiscal years 2004, 2005, 2006, 2008, and 2009 approved the pay raise as the ECI increase plus 0.5%. The 2007 pay raise was equal to the ECI.

A military pay raise larger than the permanent formula is not uncommon. In addition to across-the-board pay raises for all military personnel, mid-year, targeted pay raises (targeted at specific grades and longevity) have also been authorized over the past several years.

=== Reserve/National Guard "drill" pay ===
According to Title 37 United States Code §206, the basic pay amount for a single drill is equal to 1/30 of the basic pay for active duty service members.

For members of the Reserve components of the United States Armed Forces performing duties with their units on drill weekends, pay is usually based on four drill sessions of four hours per session, equal in pay to four days of active duty basic pay.

=== Common allowances ===
- Basic Allowance for Housing (BAH)
  - According to myarmybenefits.us.army.mil Basic Allowance for Housing (BAH) is a United States (U.S.) based allowance that provides uniformed Service members equitable housing compensation based on housing costs in local housing markets when government quarters are not provided. A Service member stationed outside the U.S., including U.S. territories and possessions, who does not have government housing available is eligible for Overseas Housing Allowance (OHA). There are several types of BAH to satisfy various housing situations that occur among military members. In general, the amount of BAH you receive depends on your location, pay grade, and whether you have dependents. Under most circumstances, you receive BAH for the location where you are assigned, not where you live. Additionally, you may be entitled to some BAH amounts if you are residing separately from your dependents. This occurs in situations involving unaccompanied overseas tours or having a dependent Child that resides with a former Spouse. The rules regarding these situations can become quite complex.
- Basic allowance for subsistence (BAS): BAS is meant to offset costs for a member's meals. This allowance is based in the historic origins of the military in which the military provided room and board (or rations) as part of a member's pay. This allowance is not intended to offset the costs of meals for family members.

Beginning on 1 January 2002, all enlisted members receive full BAS, but paid for their meals (including those provided by the government). It was the culmination of the BAS reform transition period.

Because BAS is intended to provide meals for the service member, its level is linked to the price of food. Therefore, each year it is adjusted based upon the increase of the price of food as measured by the USDA food cost index. This is why the increase to BAS will not necessarily be the same percentage as that applied to the increase in basic pay, as annual pay raises are linked to the increase of private sector wages. As of 2024, enlisted members receive $460.25; officers receive $316.98 per month.

Enlisted BAS II. Enlisted members on duty at a permanent station and assigned to single (unaccompanied) government quarters, which do not have adequate food storage or preparation facilities, and where a government mess is not available and the government cannot otherwise make meals available, may be entitled to BAS II. The rate for BAS II is fixed at twice the rate for standard enlisted BAS. Effective 10 February 2006, the Navy authorized the payment of BAS II. Effective 1 October 2010, the Air Force authorized payment of BAS II to members at specific locations.

- Overseas housing allowance (OHA) is BAH for servicemembers stationed OCONUS. This differs from BAH in that it reimburses actual housing costs below a certain amount, and therefore servicemembers cannot save any extra pay from this allowance.
- Clothing allowance: Comes to most members on an annual basis to buy and replace required uniforms. The amount varies by service and rank. (Typically, commissioned officers receive no clothing replacement allowance.)

=== Pay raises ===
U.S. code dictates a rather complex equation for military pay raises, based on the Employment Cost Index, a measure compiled by the Bureau of Labor Statistics to track the costs of labor for businesses. Military pay increases by "the percentage (rounded to the nearest one-tenth of one percent) by which the ECI for the base quarter of the year before the preceding year exceeds the ECI for the base quarter of the second year before the preceding calendar year (if at all)". Specifically, the code states that the ECI for wages and salaries of private industry workers will be used.

Essentially, when the ECI goes up, so does military pay, so that military salaries do not fall behind civilian ones. For example, because the ECI increased 1.4 percent in 2009, that was the military pay raise in 2010. That raise was unusually low — the smallest percent change since the series began in 1975, according to the Bureau of Labor Statistics.

The president is empowered to suggest a lower or higher pay raise, which must be ratified by Congress, in extenuating circumstances like an economic crisis. Congress can also vote to change the president's proposed decrease or increase. For the 2011 budget, the House Armed Services Committee suggested boosting the 1.4 percent raise. But Defense personnel officials resisted, saying they would rather that money be used for other programs that benefit military families. After an 11-year string of increases that slightly exceeded average private sector annual raises, Army Deputy Chief of Staff for Personnel Lt. Gen. Thomas P. Bostick said that, "We actually think we have a surplus in terms of pay." The Department of Defense announced increases in military housing allowances, family support programs, and child care and tuition assistance for military families in the 2011 budget request, many of which outpace the base pay increase.

== Special pay ==
A member may be eligible for some of the following pays depending on rating (MOS) and assignment (location and duty).

- Submarine duty pay: Varies by rank and time in service
- Sea duty pay: Varies by rank and time in service
- Flight pay: For members on flying status. Monthly pay varies by rank and flight experience.
- Jump pay: For military parachutists who meet the requirements. Regular is $150 per month, HALO is $225 per month
- Foreign Language Proficiency Pay
- Imminent danger pay: For members in a designated imminent danger pay area

== Historic pay raise chart ==
Ref
| Year | Military pay raise percent | Average private sector raise | Pay gap |
|---|---|---|---|
| 1976 | 5.0 | 9.0 | 2.6% |
| 1977 | 3.6 | 7.0 | 4.8% |
| 1978 | 6.2 | 6.8 | 4.5% |
| 1979 | 5.5 | 7.5 | 6.5% |
| 1980 | 7.0 | 7.8 | 7.3% |
| 1981 | 11.7 | 9.1 | 4.7% |
| 1982 | 14.3 | 9.1 | -0.5% |
| 1983 | 4.0 | 8.1 | 3.6% |
| 1984 | 4.0 | 5.6 | 5.2% |
| 1985 | 4.0 | 5.1 | 6.3% |
| 1986 | 3.0 | 4.4 | 7.7% |
| 1987 | 3.0 | 4.2 | 8.9% |
| 1988 | 2.0 | 3.5 | 10.4% |
| 1989 | 4.1 | 3.5 | 9.8% |
| 1990 | 3.6 | 4.4 | 10.6% |
| 1991 | 4.1 | 4.4 | 10.9% |
| 1992 | 4.2 | 4.2 | 10.9% |
| 1993 | 3.7 | 3.7 | 10.9% |
| 1994 | 2.2 | 2.7 | 11.4% |
| 1995 | 2.6 | 3.1 | 11.9% |
| 1996 | 2.4 | 2.9 | 12.4% |
| 1997 | 3.0 | 2.8 | 12.2% |
| 1998 | 2.8 | 3.3 | 12.7% |
| 1999 | 3.6 | 3.6 | 12.7% |
| 2000 | 6.2 | 4.3 | 10.8% |
| 2001 | 4.1 | 3.2 | 9.9% |
| 2002 | 6.9 | 4.1 | 7.1% |
| 2003 | 4.1 | 3.6 | 6.0% |
| 2004 | 4.2 | 3.1 | 4.9% |
| 2005 | 3.5 | 3.0 | 4.4% |
| 2006 | 3.1 | 2.6 | 3.9% |
| 2007 | 4.6 | 2.2 | 3.4% |
| 2008 | 3.5 | 3.0 | 2.9% |
| 2009 | 3.9 | 3.4 | 2.4% |
| 2010 | 3.4 | 3.0 | 2.0% |
| 2011 | 1.4 | 2.9 | 3.5% |
| 2012 | 1.6 | 2.8 | 4.7% |
| 2013 | 1.7 | 2.8 | 5.8% |
| 2014 | 1.0 | 2.9 | 7.7% |
| 2015 | 1.0 | 1.9 | 8.6% |
| 2016 | 1.3 | 2.3 | 9.6% |
| 2017 | 2.1 | 2.8 | 10.3% |
| 2018 | 2.4 | 3.3 | 11.2% |
| 2019 | 2.6 | 3.0 | 11.6% |
| 2020 | 3.1 | 2.5 | 11.0% |
| 2021 | 3.0 | 4.6 | 12.6% |
| 2022 | 2.7 | UNK | UNK |
| 2023 | 4.6 | UNK | UNK |
| 2024 | 5.2 | UNK | UNK |
| 2025 | 4.5 | UNK | UNK |
| 2026 | 3.8 | UNK | UNK |

== Other types of pay ==
- Incentive pay: Example, Korea Area Incentive Program (KAIP)
- Hardship pay: Monthly pay for certain "hardship duty locations". The rate varies by the location.
- Hostile fire pay/imminent danger pay: Monthly pay that appears on the LES as "HFP/IDP". Sometimes referred to as "combat pay".
- Hazardous duty pay: Monthly additional pay for certain "hazardous" duty assignments, such as the flight deck operations personnel on an aircraft carrier. Other examples are parachuting and scuba diving.
- Family separation allowance: Money paid when required to be away from dependents (spouse, minor children, or other designated individuals) due to military duties. Technically it is intended to offset the costs associated with being separated such as landscaping, car maintenance, occasional child care, phone calls and mail, rather than being a monetary compensation for the emotional effect of the distant spouse. Appears on the LES as "FSH".
- COLA (cost of living allowance): Non-taxable money paid monthly to offset the additional costs of living in a particular location, usually an overseas location. The amount of COLA varies by country and possibly location in a country. The amount of COLA also varies by rank, number of dependents (in the location) as well as living situation (off base may receive more than on base) and the exchange rate between the US dollar and the local currency. COLA is meant to provide a member overseas and a CONUS the same spending power, so COLA may go up and down as prices in either country change.

== See also ==
- Uniformed services pay grades of the United States
- Military compensation

== Sources ==
- Ballenstedt, Brittany R. "Obama backs 2 percent civilian pay raise, 2.9 percent for military." Government Executive. 26 February 2009.
- Berry, John. "January 2010 Pay Adjustments." Press release. United States Office of Personnel Management.
- Bureau of Labor Statistics. "Employment Cost Index – December 2009." 29 January 2010.
- "Adjustments of monthly basic pay." 37 USC 1009.
- Miles, Donna. "Pay, Medical, Family Issues Highlight Budget Request." Press release. American Forces Press Service. 26 January 2010.
- Maze, Rick. "Officials: Fund programs, not bigger raise." Army Times. 19 March 2010.
