= Oral Proficiency Interview =

An Oral Proficiency Interview (OPI) is a standardized, global assessment of functional speaking ability. Taking the form of a conversation between the tester and test-taker, the test measures how well a person speaks a language by assessing their performance of a range of language tasks against specified criteria. In the United States, the criteria for each of ten proficiency levels are described in the ACTFL Proficiency Guidelines, devised by the American Council on the Teaching of Foreign Languages (ACTFL).

In an OPI, the test-taker is interviewed by a certified ACTFL tester, who guides the conversation to explore the abilities and limits of the individual's oral target language abilities. During the course of the interview, the interviewee is guided to engage in a variety of tasks such as describing, narrating, and hypothesizing. The interview is recorded and scored by the interviewer as well as a second certified tester using the following scale: Superior, Advanced High, Advanced Mid, Advanced Low, Intermediate High, Intermediate Mid, Intermediate Low, Novice High, Novice Mid, Novice Low.

The OPI test format consists of four stages. In the first stage, otherwise known as the "Warm-up" stage, the interviewee is put at ease and provides the interviewer with information they can use later in the interview. The interviewer may ask "What are some things that interest you?" This stage is also used to indicate the interviewee's skill level before moving further into the interview. The second stage, called "Level Checks", helps identify what the interviewee can do and finds the highest level of sustained performance by the speaker (floor). Questions at the second stage might be, "Which cryptocurrency would you buy?" or "How is cryptocurrency changing the way we interact monetarily?" The third stage, known as "Probes", shows the interviewer what the interviewee cannot do, and finds the lowest level of performance which they are unable to sustain for prolonged periods of time (ceiling). Questions at the third stage might be, "Is Cryptocurrency a waste of money? Why or why not?" or "Explain to me why Cryptocurrency has more or less value". An effective OPI will show an interviewee what they can and can't do with their speech in the target language. The fourth and final stage, known as the "Wind-down", is designed to ease the interviewee and bring them to a comfortable level of speaking. The interviewer may end the interview by asking, "Do you have any plans for this weekend?" As the interviewer wraps up the interview, the interviewee will feel a sense of confidence as they exit the interview.

The levels of ACTFL's scale can be conceived as an inverse triangle, with the "Superior" rating at the top representing a wide range of skill in linguistic structures, vocabulary, and fluency. The Novice Low category forms the bottom point of the triangle, showing little functional knowledge of the language. Each progressive category represents broader skills and depth of knowledge. While one can progress relatively quickly through the Novice levels, progress is much slower through the upper ratings.

OPI is generally used for native speakers of English, but it was adopted in South Korea after the computer version was developed by the Korean computer company Credu. In September 2009, 40,000 people applied to take the test in South Korea.

== Oral Proficiency Interview - computer ==
Oral Proficiency Interview - computer (OPIc) is a computerized test of English-usage skills developed by the American Council on the Teaching of Foreign Languages (ACTFL) and Language Testing International (LTI). It is a computer-based version of the OPI. OPIc is a kind of test business interview. The one-hour test is a series of recorded questions that are assessed by a computer. The test scores have seven levels. The evaluations are done by ACTFL professionals in the United States.

== Criticism ==
In addition to presenting both test takers and test users with a significant time and finciancial burden, some researchers have also noted that the ACTFL OPI is limited by the fact that its scores are based on a series of subjective statements, rather than empirical measurements of linguistic performance. Researchers have also shown that OPI test takers' ratings can be significantly affected by their anxiety during the test, and that rating judgements can vary significantly between individual raters.
