= Pay grade =

Salary range for employment

A pay grade is a unit in systems of monetary compensation for employment. It is commonly used in public service, both civil and military, but also for companies of the private sector.

The United States military has used it since the inception of the United States Department of Defense, and in the Department of the Army at least as early as 1919, as well as the United States Department of the Navy. United States Post Office clerks and letter carriers also had pay grades by 1919. 1919 was immediately after the Great War, when bureaucracies were becoming more systematic, so it makes sense that pay grades were more prevalent by that time. As of 2026, pay grades continue to be used by the United States military.

Pay grades are also commonly used by academia, where they are sometimes called by other names, such as salary schedules.

Pay grades facilitate the employment process by providing a fixed framework of salary ranges, as opposed to a free negotiation.

Typically, pay grades encompass two dimensions: a “vertical” range where each level corresponds to the responsibility of, and requirements needed for a certain position; and a “horizontal” range within this scale to allow for monetary incentives rewarding the employee's quality of performance or length of service. Thus, an employee progresses within the horizontal and vertical ranges upon achieving positive appraisal on a regular basis. In most cases, evaluation is done annually and encompasses more than one method.

== "Above my pay grade" ==
In parts of the English-speaking world, it may be said that an answer to a given question is "above one's pay grade" (or "beyond one's pay grade"). This is intended to convey that the respondent is not qualified or authorised to answer said question, and it must be referred to a higher (and implicitly higher-paid) authority for a definitive response.

== See also ==
- Job evaluation – Procedures to identify content of a job activities, attributes or requirements to perform (used to determine which pay grade should apply to a specific type of job, irrespective of who does it).
- Equal pay – Concept of labour rights that people doing jobs of equal value should be awarded equally, irrespective of race or gender.
