= American Council on the Teaching of Foreign Languages =

Language education organization

- Abbreviation: ACTFL
- Formation: 1967; 59 years ago
- President: Milton Alan Turner
- Website: www.actfl.org

American Council on the Teaching of Foreign Languages (ACTFL) is a language education organization based in Alexandria, Virginia. It is an individual membership organization and administrators from elementary through graduate education, as well as in government and industry.

The organization was founded in 1967 as a small offshoot of the Modern Language Association (MLA). The organization has advocated for language education funding and connected colleagues at the ACTFL Annual Convention.

== The Language Educator ==
The Language Educator (TLE) magazine is ACTFL's membership publication. TLE is published quarterly with issues available to members in print and for digital download and via a mobile app.

== ACTFL language proficiency guidelines ==
The ACTFL Proficiency Guidelines provide a means of assessing the proficiency of a foreign language speaker. It is widely used in schools and universities in the United States.

The guidelines are broken up into different proficiency levels:

- novice – subdivided into low (NL), mid (NM), and high (NH)
- intermediate – subdivided into low (IL), mid (IM), and high (IH)
- advanced – subdivided into low (AL), mid (AM), and high (AH)
- superior (S)
- distinguished (D)

These proficiency levels are defined separately for ability to listen, speak, read and write. Thus, in those American programs that emphasize written language over spoken, students may reach the advanced level in reading and writing while remaining at a lower level in listening and speaking.

The ACTFL Performance Descriptors are defined in three different subsets of communications skills with their own more generalized grading scales in terms of domains, functions, contexts/ content, text type, language control, vocabulary, communication strategies, cultural awareness in all of the following modes of communication:

- Interpersonal (Novice, Intermediate, and Advanced)
- Interpretative (Novice, Intermediate, and Advanced)
- Presentational (Novice, Intermediate, and Advanced)

On January 30, 2026, ACTFL filed a lawsuit against Avant Assessment and the Global Seal of Biliteracy. The lawsuit claims that Avant's references to the ACTFL Proficiency Guidelines and its description of STAMP assessments as aligned to those Guidelines constitute a violation by Avant of some intellectual property right of ACTFL. ACTFL claims sole ownership of the Guidelines and alleges they were developed exclusively for use with ACTFL's own for-profit assessments which are marketed and delivered by Language Testing International (LTI), a Samsung company. ACTFL states on its website that “Only official ACTFL tests are aligned to the Guidelines.” Beyond the trademark issues, ACTFL is asking the Court to stop Avant and the Global Seal from using or referring to the Guidelines — and has demanded that Avant stop using even the proficiency terms "Novice," "Intermediate," and "Advanced." ACTFL is also seeking significant monetary relief, including all profits Avant has earned that it attributes to the alleged infringement, potentially tripled by the court.

== See also ==
- Task-based language learning
- Common European Framework of Reference for Languages
- Canadian language benchmarks
- Defense Language Proficiency Tests
- Oral Proficiency Interview
- Language education in the United States
