= List of cyber warfare forces =

List of national military and government units specializing in cyber warfare

Many countries around the world maintain military units that are specifically trained to operate in a cyberwarfare environment. In several cases these units act also as the national computer emergency response team for civilian cybersecurity threats.

== Albania ==
- Military Cyber Security Unit (Një e Sigurisë Kibernetike)

== Argentina ==
- Joint Cyber Defense Command of the Armed Forces Joint Staff (Comando Conjunto de Ciberdefensa del Estado Mayor Conjunto de las Fuerzas Armadas)
  - Cyberdefense Operations Center (Centro de Operaciones de Ciberdefensa)
  - Cyberdefense Engineering Center (Centro de Ingenieria de Ciberdefensa)
  - Security Operations Intelligent Center (Centro Inteligente de Operaciones de Seguridad)
- National Cyberdefense Center (Centro Nacional de Ciberdefensa)
  - Informatic Energencies Response Center of the Defense Ministry (Centro de Respuesta ante Emergencias Informáticas del Minisetrio de Defensa)
  - Cybernetic Analysis Laboratory (Laboratorio de Análisis Cibernéticos)

== Armenia ==
- Subdivision 1991 (1991 Ստորաբաժանում - 1991 Storabazhanum)

== Australia ==
- Information Warfare Division
  - Defence Signals Intelligence and Cyber Command
  - Joint Cyber Unit
    - Army
      - 138th Signal Squadron
    - Navy
      - Fleet Cyber Unit
    - Air Force
      - No. 462 Information Warfare Squadron

== Austria ==
- Information Communications Technologies and Cybersecurity Center (Informations-Kommunikations-Technologie und Cybersicherheitszentrum)

== Azerbaijan ==
- Special Communication and Information Security State Service (Xüsusi Rabitə və İnformasiya Təhlükəsizliyi Dövlət Xidməti)

== Belarus ==
- Information Technology Specialized Company (Специализированную роту по информационной безопасности - Spetsializirovannuyu Rotu po Informatsionnoy Bezopasnosti)

== Belgium ==
- Defense Cyber Directorate
- Cyber Command

== Bolivia ==
- Cybersecurity and Cyberdefense Center (Centro de Ciberseguridad y Ciberdefensa)

== Brazil ==
- Cybernetic Defense Command (Comando de Defesa Cibernética)
  - National Cybernetic Defense School (Escola Nacional de Defesa Cibernética)
  - Cybernetic Defense Center (Centro de Defesa Cibernética)

== Brunei ==
- Air Force
  - Cyber Defence Unit

== Bulgaria ==
- Stationary Communication Information System (Стационарна Комуникационна Информационна Система - Statsionarna Komunikatsionna Informatsionna Sistema)

== Canada ==
- Canadian Armed Forces Cyber Command (CAFCYBERCOM), established on September 26, 2024
- Canadian Forces Network Operation Centre
- Army Reserve
  - Cyber Group, 32 Signal Regiment
  - Cyber Group, 34 Signal Regiment

== Chile ==
- Cyberdefense Incidents Response Center (Centro de Respuesta a Incidencias de Ciberdefensa)

== China (People’s Republic of China) ==
- Ministry of State Security
  - Jiangsu State Security Department
- People's Liberation Army Strategic Support Force (人民解放军战略支援部队 - Rénmín Jiěfàngjūn Zhànlüè Zhīyuán Bùduì)
  - People's Liberation Army Network System Department (人民解放军网络系统部 - Rénmín Jiěfàngjūn Wǎngluò Xìtǒng Bù)
    - Unit 61489 (61489部队 - 61489 Bùduì)
    - Unit 61786 (61786部队 - 61786 Bùduì)
    - 56th Jiangan Computing Technologies Research Institute (第56江南计算技术研究所 - Dì 56 Jiāngnán Jìsuàn Jìshù Yánjiū Suǒ)
    - 57th Research Institute (第57研究所 - Dì 57 Yánjiū Suǒ)
    - 58th Research Institute (第58研究所 - Dì 58 Yánjiū Suǒ)
    - Cyberspace Security Academy (网络空间安全学院 - Wǎngluò Kōngjiān Ānquán Xuéyuàn)

== China (Republic of China/“Taiwan”) ==
- Information Communication and Electronic Warfare Command (信息和电子战司令部 - Xìnxī Hé Diànzǐ Zhàn Sīlìng Bù)

== Colombia ==
- Joint Cybernetic Command (Comando Conjunto Cibernetico)
  - National Army Cybernetic Unit (Unidad Cibernética Ejército Nacional)
  - National Navy Cibernetic Unit (Unidad Cibernética Armada Nacional)
  - Air Force Cybernetic Unit (Unidad Cibernética Fuerza Aérea)
- Communications and Cyberdefense Operational Support Command (Comando de Apoyo Operacional de Comunicaciones y Ciberdefensa)

== Croatia ==
- Cybernetic Domain Command of the General Staff (Zapovjedništvo za Kibernetički Prostor Generalštaba)

== Cuba ==
- Military Cyberdefense Command (Mando Militar de Ciberdefensa)

== Cyprus ==
- Cyber Defense Command of the General Staff of National Defense (Διοίκηση Κυβερνοάμυνας του Γενικού Επιτελείου Εθνικής Άμυνας - Dioíkisi Kyvernoámynas tou Genikoú Epiteleíou Ethnikís Ámynas)

== Czech Republic ==
- Czech Information and Cyber Forces
  - 92nd Cyber Warfare Group
- National Cyber Operations Centre (Národní centrum kybernetických operací)

== Denmark ==
- The defense intelligence service

- Center for Cyber Security (Center for Cybersikkerhed)

== Dominican Republic ==
- Armed Forces Command, Control, Communications, Computers, Cybersecurity and Intelligence Center (Centro de Comando, Control, Comunicaciones, Computadoras, Ciberseguridad e Inteligencia de las Fuerzas Armadas)

== Ecuador ==
- Cyberdefense Command (Comando de Ciberdefensa)

== Estonia ==
- Cyber Command (Küberväejuhatus)
- Defence League Cyberdefense Unit (Kaitseliidu küberkaitseüksus)

== Finland ==
- Defense Forces Command System Center (Puolustusvoimien Johtamisjärjestelmäkeskus)

== France ==
- Inter-service
  - Cyberdefence Command (Commandement de la Cyberdéfense)
    - Armed Forces Cyberdefence Group (Groupement de la Cyberdéfense des Armées)
      - Information Systems Security Audit Center (Centre d’Audits de la Sécurité des Systèmes d’Information)
      - Defensive Computer Fighting Analysis Center (Centre d’Analyse en Lutte Informatique Défensive)
      - Cyber Operational Readiness Center (Centre Cyber de Préparation Opérationnelle)
      - Main Inter-services Standardization Center(Centre d’Homologation Principale Interarmées)
- Army
  - Operational Center for Land Information and Communication Systems and Cybersecurity Networks (Centre Opérationnel des Réseaux SIC (Systèmes d’Information et de Communication) Terre et de Cybersécurité)
  - Cyber Defence Regiment
- Navy
  - Cyber Defense Support Center (Centre Support de Cyber-Défense)
  - Cyber Defense Platoon, Commando Kieffer (Section de Cyberdéfense, Commando Kieffer)
- Air Force
  - Aerospace Environment Cyberdefence Center of Excellence (Centre d’Excellence en Cyberdéfense du Milieu Aérospatial)

== Georgia ==
- Cyber Security Bureau

== Germany ==
- Cyber and Information Domain Command (Kommando Cyber- und Informationsraum)
  - Armed Forces Information Technology Command (Kommando Informationstechnik der Bundeswehr)
    - Armed Forces Cyber Security Center (Zentrum für Cyber-Sicherheit der Bundeswehr)
  - Strategic Reconnaissance Command (Kommando Strategische Aufklärung)
    - Cyber Operations Center (Zentrum Cyber-Operationen)

== Greece ==
- Cyber Defense Directorate of the General Staff of National Defense (Διεύθυνση Κυβερνοάμυνας του Γενικού Επιτελείου Εθνικής Άμυνας - Diéfthynsi Kyvernoámynas tou Genikoú Epiteleíou Ethnikís Ámynas)

== Guatemala ==
- Computing and Technology Command (Comando de Informática y Tecnología)
- Ministry of the Interior of Guatemala (Ministerio de Gobernación de Guatemala)

== Hungary ==
- Cyber Defense Center - Military National Security Service (Kibervédelmi Központ - Katonai Nemzetbiztonsági Szolgálat)

== India ==
- Defence Cyber Agency

== Indonesia ==
- Inter-service
  - Indonesian National Armed Forces Cyber Unit (Satuan Siber Tentara Nasional Indonesia)
- Army
  - Army Cypher and Cyber Center (Pusat Sandi dan Siber Angkatan Darat)
- Navy
  - Navy Security and Cypher Service (Dinas Pengamanan dan Persandian Angkatan Laut)
    - Navy Cyber Unit (Satuan Siber TNI-AL)
- Air Force
  - Air Force Security and Cypher Service (Dinas Pengamanan dan Persandian Angkatan Udara)
    - Air Force Cyber Unit (Satuan Siber TNI-AU)

== Iran ==
- Cyber Defense Command (قرارگاه دفاع سایبری; - Gharargah-e Defa-e Saiberi)
- Islamic Revolutionary Guard Corps Cyber Command

== Ireland ==
- Communications and Information Services Corps (An Cór Seirbhísí Cumarsáide agus Eolais)

== Israel ==
- Inter-services
  - C4I and Cyber Defense Directorate
  - Unit 8200 (יחידה 8200 - Yehida Shmonae Matayim)
- Air Force
  - Unit "Horizon 324" (יחידת "אופק 324 - Yehidat "Ofek 324" )

== Italy ==
Inter-service

- Network Operations Command (Comando per le Operazioni in Rete)
  - Security and Cyber Defence Unit (Reparto Sicurezza e Cyber Defence)
  - Cyber Operations Unit (Reparto Cyber Operations)

Army

- Cybernetic Security Unit (Reparto Sicurezza Cibernetica)
- Computer Incident Response Team - 3rd Signal Regiment (Nucleo CIRT - 3° Reggimento Trasmissioni)
- Computer Incident Response Team - 32nd Signal Regiment (Nucleo CIRT - 32° Reggimento Trasmissioni)
- Computer Incident Response Team - 46th Signal Regiment (Nucleo CIRT - 46° Reggimento Trasmissioni)

Navy

- Cybernetic, Informatic and Signal Security Office (Ufficio Sicurezza Cibernetica, Informatica e delle Comunicazioni)

Air Force

- Automated Information Systems Unit (Reparto Sistemi Informativi Automatizzati)

== Japan ==
- Japan Air Self-Defense Force (航空自衛隊 - Kōkū Jieitai)
- Self Defence Force Command and Communication System Department (自衛隊指揮通信システム隊 - Jieitai Shiki Tsūshin Shisutemu-Tai)
  - Cyber Defense Team (サイバー防衛隊 - Saibā Bōei-Tai)
  - Network Operations Team (ネットワーク運用隊 - Nettowāku Un'yō-Tai)

== Jordan ==
- Armed Forces Computer Emergency Response Team

== Korea (Democratic People’s Republic of Korea/“North Korea”) ==
- Research Institute 110 (110호 연구소 - 110ho Yeonguso)
  - 31st Technical Reconnaissance Office (기술정찰조 31소 - Gisuljeongchaljo 31so)
  - 32nd Technical Reconnaissance Office (기술정찰조 32소 - Gisuljeongchaljo 32so)
  - 56th Technical Reconnaissance Office (기술정찰조 56소 - Gisuljeongchaljo 56so)

General Staff Department of the Korean People's Army:

- Operation Bureau
- Communications Bureau
- Electronic Warfare Bureau
- Enemy Collapse Sabotage Bureau: (Note: According to others, Unit 204 may be under: KWP United Front Department’s Operations Bureau, Enemy Operations Department, (Note: AKA 563rd Unit, conducts operations against populations in territories occupied by the KPA, assesses reactionaries, and seeks out KPA supporters.) or Unification Bureau’s Operations Department)
  - Unit 204 (Note: cyber psychological and information warfare operations, using phishing e-mails against the Korean military, and research.)
- Command Automation Bureau/Department: (Note: AKA General Staffs Electronic Warfare Department, responsible for military communications, system penetration programs, and electronic warfare operations, composed of two brigade-level electronic warfare units with 600 staff members each, one in Sangwön, South P'yöng'an Province and one in Nampo City)
  - (General Staff's) Office 31/unit (develops hacking tools)
  - (General Staff's) Office/unit 32 (develops military-related software)
  - (General Staff's) Office/unit 56 (develops software for command and control)

Reconnaissance General Bureau: (Note: RGB; 정찰총국; military spy agency controlled by the regime’s Defense Ministry and North Korea’s primary (foreign-)intelligence bureau/agency.)

- Bureau 325 (stealing information on vaccine technology related to COVID-19)
- Bureau 121 (network attacks and exfiltration operations)
  - Lab 110 (Technology Reconnaissance Team) (Note: collects intelligence and conducts offensive cyber operations penetrating adversary networks and infecting networks with malware)
    - Office 98
    - Office 414
    - Office 35
  - Office/Unit 91: (Note: Cyber attack unit / headquarters of North Korea’s hacking operations in Mangkyungdae district of Pyongyang.)
    - Unit 110 (AKA Technology Reconnaissance Team)
    - Unit 35 (Central Party's Investigations Department)
    - Unit 121 (NKPA Joint Chiefs Cyber Warfare Unit 121)
    - Unit 204 (Cyber PSYOPS)
  - Unit 180
  - 128 Liaison Office
  - 413 Liaison Office
  - The Andariel Group
  - The Bluenoroff Group
  - an Electronic Warfare Jamming Regiment
  - Lazarus Group
- Computer Technology Research Lab
- 6th Technical Bureau of the Reconnaissance General Bureau
  - Bureau/Lab 110 / 110 Institute (Technology Reconnaissance Team, conducts computer network operations against military units and strategic organizations.)
- 3rd Bureau of the RGB (AKA 3rd Technical Surveillance Bureau, responsible for North Korea's cyber operations)
  - 110th Research Center
    - Lazarus Group
      - Bluenoroff (earn revenue illicitly in response to increased global sanctions...)
      - Andariel (See source for details)

Others:

- The Data Investigation Examination Office (conducts cyber espionage to collect intelligence on politics, economics, and societies abroad)
- KWP's Unification and United Front Department (cyber influence operations through social media and websites such as Uriminzokkiri, which is maintained by the party's Committee for the Peaceful Reunification of the Fatherland.)
- The KWP Central Party Investigative Group
  - Unit 35 (education and training).
- The State Security Department's (secret police) communications monitoring and computer hacking group conducts cyber warfare, presumably in support of its mission of internal state security.

== Korea (Republic of Korea/“South Korea”) ==
- Cyber Operations Command (사이버 작전 사령부 - Saibeo Jagjeon Salyeongbu)
  - 500th Center (Cyber Defense Operations Office) (500센터(사이버방어작전 담당) – 500 Senteo Saibeobang-Eojagjeon Damdang)
  - 700th Center (Cyber Threats Information Management Office) (700센터(사이버위협정보 담당) – 700 Senteo (Saibeo Wihyeob Jeongbo Damdang))

== Latvia ==
- National Guard Cyber Defence Unit (Zemessardzes Kiberaizsardzības Vienība)

== Lithuania ==
Lithuanian Armed Forces

- Cyber Defence Command (Kibernetinės gynybos valdyba)
  - Lithuanian Great Hetman Kristupas Radvila Perkūnas CIS Battalion (LDE Kristupo Radvilos Perkūno RIS batalionas)
  - Information technology service (Informacinių technologijų tarnyba)

National Cyber Security Centre of Lithuania (Nacionalinis kibernetinio saugumo centras)

== Malaysia ==
- Cyber and Electromagnetic Command (Pemerintahan Siber dan Elektromagnetik)

== Mexico ==
Mexican Army

- Cyberspace Operations Center (Centro de Operaciones del Ciberespacio)

Mexican Navy

- Cybersecurity Unit (Unidad de Ciberseguridad)

== Moldova ==
- Armed Forces Cybernetic Incidents Reaction Center (Centru de Reacție la Incidente Cibernetice a Forțelor Armate)

== Morocco ==
- Royal Armed Forces Cyber Center of Excellence

== NATO ==
- Cyber Operations Centre
- NATO Cyber Range
- Cooperative Cyber Defence Centre of Excellence
- European Centre of Excellence for Countering Hybrid Threats

== Netherlands ==
- Defense Cyber Command (Defensie Cyber Commando)
- Defense Cyber Security Centre
- Joint Signal Intelligence (SIGINT) Cyber Unit

== New Zealand ==
- Cyber Cell, 1st Command Support Regiment

== Nigeria ==
- Cyber Warfare Command

== Norway ==
- Cyber Defence Force (Cyberforsvarets)
  - Cyber Defense Computer Information Services (CIS) Regiment (Cyberforsvarets CIS-regiment)
  - Cyber Security Center (Cybersikkerhetssenteret)
  - Cyber Defense Weapons School (Cyberforsvarets Våpenskole)
  - Cyber Defense Information and Communication Technologies (ICT) Service (Cyberforsvarets IKT-tjenester)
  - Cyber Defense Base and Alarm Service (Cyberforsvarets Base- og Alarmtjenester)

== Pakistan ==
PAF Cyber Force.

== Paraguay ==
- General Directorate of Information and Communication Technologies of the Armed Forces (Dirección General de Tecnologías de la Información y Comunicación de las Fuerzas Armadas)

== Peru ==
- Cyberdefense Operational Command (Comando Operacional de Ciberdefensa)

== Philippines ==
- Army Cyber Defense Team

== Poland ==
- Cybernetic Operations Center (Centrum Operacji Cybernetycznych)
- National Center for Cyberspace Security (Narodowe Centrum Bezpieczeństwa Cyberprzestrzeni)
- Defense Ministry Coordination Center for Computer Incident Response - Military Counterintelligence Service (Centrum Koordynacyjnego Systemu Reagowania na Incydenty Komputerowe Obrony Narodowej - Służba Kontrwywiadu Wojskowego)
- Cyberspace Defense Forces (Wojska Obrony Cyberprzestrzeni)

== Portugal ==
- Cyberdefense Center - Armed Forces General Staff (Centro de Ciberdefesa – Estado Maior General das Forças Armadas)
  - Computer Incident Response Capability - Army (CIRC Exercito)
  - Computer Incident Response Capability - Navy (CIRC Marinha)
  - Computer Incident Response Capability - Air Force (CIRC Força Aerea)

== Romania ==
- Cyber Defence Command (Comandamentul Apărării Cibernetice)
  - Information Technology Agency (Agenţia de Tehnologia Informaţiei)
  - Cyber Defence Agency (Agenţia de Apărăre Cibernetică)
    - Computer Emergency Response Team - Military (Centrul de Răspuns la Incidente de Securitate Cibernetică)
  - Deployable Cyber Defence Systems and IT Agency (Agenția pentru Sisteme Dislocabile de Apărare Cibernetică și Tehnologia Informației)
  - Logistics Section (Secția logistică)

== The Russian Federation ==
- Information Operations Troops (Войска информационных операций - Voyska Informatsionnykh Operatsiy)
  - Western Military District Cybersecurity Center (Западный военный округ центр киберзащиты – Zapadnyy Voyenny Okrug Tsentr Kiberzashchity)
  - Southern Military District Cybersecurity Center (Южный военный округ центр киберзащиты – Yuzhnyy Voyenny Okrug Tsentr Kiberzashchity)
  - Central Military District Cybersecurity Center (Центральный военный округ центр киберзащиты – Tsentral'nyy Voyenny Okrug Tsentr Kiberzashchity)
  - Eastern Military District Cybersecurity Center (Восточный военный округ центр киберзащиты – Vostochnyy Voyenny Okrug Tsentr Kiberzashchity)
  - Joint Strategic Command “Northern Fleet” Cybersecurity Center (Объединённое стратегическое командование “Северный флот” центр киберзащиты - Ob"yedinonnoye Strategicheskoye Komandovaniye “Severnyy flot” Tsentr Kiberzashchity)
  - Special Development Center of the Ministry of Defense (Центр специальных разработок Министерства обороны - Tsentr Spetsial'nykh Razrabotok Ministerstva Oborony)
- 6th Directorate - General Directorate of the General Staff (Шестое Управление-Главное управление Генерального штаба - Shestoye Upravleniye-Glavnoye Upravleniye General'nogo Shtaba)
  - 85th Special Service Main Center – Military Unit 26165 (85-й главный центр специальной службы-Военная часть 26165 - 85-y Glavnyy Tsentr Spetsial'noy Sluzhby-Voyennaya Chast' 26165))
  - Special Technologies Main Center – Military Unit 74455 (Главный центр специальных технологий-Военная часть 74455 - Glavnyy Tsentr Spetsial'nykh Tekhnologiy-Voyennaya Chast' 74455)

== Serbia ==
- 224th Center for Electronic Action (224. Центар за електронска дејства - 224. Centar za Elektronska Dejstva)

== Singapore ==
- Defence Cyber Organisation
  - Cyber Defence School
  - Cyber Defence Group
  - Digital and Intelligence Service

== Slovakia ==
- Military Intelligence Cybernetic Defense Center (Centrum pre Kybernetickú Obranu - Vojenského Spravodajstva )

== South Africa ==
- Directorate Information Warfare

== Slovenia ==
- Communication and Information Systems Unit (Enota za Komunikacijske in Informacijske Sisteme)
  - Cyber Defence Centre (Center za Kibernetsko Obrambo)
  - Threat Research Centre (Center za Raziskovanje Groženj)

== Spain ==
Inter-service

- Joint Cyberspace Command (Mando Conjunto del Ciberespacio)
  - Cyberspace Operations Force (Fuerza de Operaciones en el Ciberespacio)
  - Cyberdefense Systems Command (Jefatura de Sistemas de Ciberdefensa)
- Army
  - 32nd Electronic Warfare Regiment (Regimiento de Guerra Electrónica nº 32)
- Navy
  - Cyberdefense Section (Sección de Ciberdefensa)
- Air Force
  - Cyberdefense Security Operations Center (Centro de Operaciones de Seguridad de Ciberdefensa)

== Sri Lanka ==
- Ministry of Defence Cyber Operations Centre (MoD COC) - SLAF Colombo
- 12th Regiment (Cyber Security), Sri Lanka Signal Corps

== Sweden ==
- Information Technologies Defense Forces (Informationsteknikförsvarsförbandet)
- Information Systems Defense Force (Informationssystemförband)
- National Defence Radio Establishment (FRA, Försvarets Radioanstalt)

== Switzerland ==
- Command Support Base (Führungsunterstützungsbasis - Base d'Aide au Commandement - Base d'Aiuto alla Condotta)
  - Cyber Security Division
  - Cyber Fusion Center
  - Cyber Battalion 42

== Thailand ==
- Army Cyber Center (ศูนย์ไซเบอร์กองทัพบก - Ṣ̄ūny̒ Sịbexr̒ Kxngthạph Bk)

== Turkey ==
- Cyber Defence Command (Siber Savunma Komutanlığı)
  - Cyber Defence Center (Siber Savunma Merkezi)

== Ukraine ==
- Command of the Communications and Cyber Security Troops of the Armed Forces of Ukraine (Командування військ зв’язку та кібернетичної безпеки Збройних Сил України - Komanduvannya vijsk zvyazku ta kibernetychnoyi bezpeky Zbroynykh Syl Ukrayiny)

== United Kingdom ==
Army

- 13th Signal Regiment
  - 224 (Defensive Cyber Operations) Signal Squadron
  - 233 (Global Communication Networks) Signal Squadron
  - 259 (Global Information Services) Signal Squadron

Navy

- Cyber Defence Operations Center

Air Force

- Air Cyber and Information Services Operations Centre
  - No. 5 (Information Services) Squadron
- 591 Defensive Cyber Air Combat Service Support Unit

Government Communications Headquarters

- National Cyber Force

Inter-service

- Joint Forces Cyber Group
  - Joint Cyber Unit (Cheltenham)
  - Joint Cyber Unit (Corsham)
    - Cyber Information Systems Operations Centre
  - Cyber Security Operations Centre
  - Defense Cyber School
- Joint Cyber Unit (Reserve)
  - Army Reserve
    - Land Information Assurance Group (Reserve)
    - 254th Specialist Group Information Services (SIGIS) Signal Squadron, 15th Signals Regiment (Reserve)
  - Navy Reserve
    - Reserve Cyber Unit
  - Royal Auxiliary Air Force
    - Cyberspace Communications Specialists Section, No. 600 (City of London) Squadron (Royal Auxiliary Air Force)
    - Cyberspace Communications Specialists Section, No. 614 (County of Glamorgan) Squadron (Royal Auxiliary Air Force)

== United States ==
Inter-service

- United States Cyber Command
  - Department of Defense Cyber Defense Command
  - Cyber National Mission Force
- National Security Agency
- Central Security Service

Army

- U.S. Army Cyber Command
  - U.S. Army Network Enterprise Technology Command
  - 1st Information Operations Command (Land)
    - 1st Information Operations Battalion
    - 2nd Information Operations Battalion
  - 780th Military Intelligence Brigade (Cyber) “Pretorians”
    - 781st Military Intelligence Battalion “Vanguard”
    - 782nd Military Intelligence Battalion “Cyber Legion”
    - 915th Cyber Warfare Battalion
    - Cyber Solutions Development Detachment
    - Task Force Echo (Army Reserve)
- U.S. Army Cyber Center of Excellence
  - U.S. Army Cyber School
  - U.S. Army Cyber Technical College
  - U.S. Army Cyber Leader College
  - Cyber Training Battalion - 15th Signal Brigade
- 1st Multi-Domain Task Force
  - Multi-Domain Effects Battalion (previously Intelligence, Information, Cyber, Electronic Warfare and Space Battalion)
    - Information Defense Company
- Army Reserve
  - Cyber Protection Brigade
    - North East Cyber Protection Center
      - Cyber Protection Team 180
      - Cyber Protection Team 181
    - National Capital Region Cyber Protection Center
      - Cyber Protection Team 182
      - Cyber Protection Team 183
    - South West Cyber Protection Center
      - Cyber Protection Team 184
      - Cyber Protection Team 185
    - North Central Cyber Protection Center
      - Cyber Protection Team 186
      - Cyber Protection Team 187
    - Western Cyber Protection Center
      - Cyber Protection Team 188
      - Cyber Protection Team 189
    - Arizona Cyber Warfare Range
- Army National Guard
  - 91st Cyber Brigade (Virginia NG)
    - 123rd Cyber Protection Battalion (Virginia NG)
    - 124th Cyber Protection Battalion (Virginia NG)
    - 125th Cyber Protection Battalion (South Carolina NG)
    - 126th Cyber Protection Battalion (Massachusetts NG)
    - 127th Cyber Protection Battalion (Indiana NG)
    - Cyber Protection Team 169 (Maryland NG)
    - Cyber Protection Team 170 (Georgia NG)
    - Cyber Protection Team 171 (California NG)
    - Cyber Protection Team 172 (Michigan NG)
    - Cyber Protection Team 173 (New York NG)
    - Cyber Protection Team 174 (Colorado and Utah NG)
    - Cyber Protection Team 175 (Alabama, Kentucky and Tennessee NG)
    - Cyber Protection Team 176 (Illinois and Wisconsin NG)
    - Cyber Protection Team 177 (Minnesota NG)
    - Cyber Protection Team 178 (Mississippi NG)
    - Cyber Protection Team 179 (Nebraska NG)
  - Defensive Cyber Operations Element (Colorado NG)
  - Defensive Cyber Operations Element (Florida NG)
  - Defensive Cyber Operations Element (Oklahoma NG)
  - Defensive Cyber Operations Element (Pennsylvania NG)
  - Defensive Cyber Operations Element (West Virginia NG)
  - Cyber Mission Assurance Team (Ohio NG)
  - Cyber Mission Assurance Team (Hawaii NG)
  - Cyber Mission Assurance Team (Washington NG)
- 56th Theater Information Operations Group (WA ARNG)

Navy

- U.S. Fleet Cyber Command – Tenth Fleet
  - Naval Network Warfare Command (Task Force 1010)
  - Navy Cyber Defense Operations Command (Task Force 1020)

Air Force

- Sixteenth Air Force (Air Force Cyber)
  - Cyberspace Capabilities Center
  - 67th Cyberspace Wing
    - 67th Operations Support Squadron (ACC)
    - 67th Cyberspace Operations Group
      - 91st Cyberspace Operations Squadron
      - 305th Cyberspace Operations Squadron
      - 352nd Cyberspace Operations Squadron
      - 367th Cyberspace Operations Squadron
      - 375th Cyberspace Operations Squadron
      - 390th Cyberspace Operations Squadron
    - 318th Cyberspace Operations Group
      - 39th Information Operations Squadron
      - 90th Cyberspace Operations Squadron ”Shadow Warriors”
      - 318th Range Squadron
      - 346th Test Squadron
    - 567th Cyberspace Operations Group
      - 92nd Cyberspace Operations Squadron
      - 834th Cyberspace Operations Squadron
      - 835th Cyberspace Operations Squadron
      - 837th Cyberspace Operations Squadron
    - 867th Cyberspace Operations Group
      - 315th Cyberspace Operations Squadron
      - 341st Cyberspace Operations Squadron
      - 833rd Cyberspace Operations Squadron
      - 836th Cyberspace Operations Squadron
  - 688th Cyberspace Wing
    - 688th Operations Support Squadron
    - 26th Cyberspace Operations Group
      - 26th Network Operations Squadron
      - 33rd Network Warfare Squadron
    - 690th Cyberspace Operations Group
      - 83rd Network Operations Squadron
      - 561st Network Operations Squadron
      - 690th Cyberspace Operations Squadron
      - 690th Intelligence Support Squadron
      - 690th Network Support Squadron
      - 691st Cyberspace Operations Squadron
      - 692d Cyberspace Operations Squadron
- Air Force Materiel Command
  - 96th Cyberspace Test Group
    - 47th Cyberspace Test Squadron
- Air Force Institute of Technology
  - Air Force Cyberspace Technical Center of Excellence
    - Center for Cyberspace Research
- Air Force Reserve
  - 960th Cyberspace Wing
    - 860th Cyberspace Operations Group
      - 51st Network Operations Squadron
      - 53rd Network Operations Squadron
      - 710th Network Operations Squadron
      - 717th Information Operations Squadron
    - 960th Cyberspace Operations Group
      - 42nd Cyberspace Operations Squadron
      - 98th Cyberspace Operations Squadron
      - 50th Network Warfare Squadron
      - 52nd Network Warfare Squadron
      - 426th Network Warfare Squadron “Guardians of the Grid”
      - 689th Network Operations Squadron
- Air National Guard
  - 179th Cyberspace Wing (Ohio ANG)
  - 175th Cyberspace Operations Group (Maryland ANG)
    - 275th Cyberspace Operations Squadron (Maryland ANG)
    - 276th Cyberspace Operations Squadron (Maryland ANG)
  - 184th Cyberspace Operations Group (Kansas ANG)
    - 127th Cyberspace Operations Squadron (Kansas ANG)
    - 177th Information Warfare Aggressor Squadron “Jayhawkers” (Kansas ANG)
    - 299th Network Operations Security Squadron (Kansas ANG)
  - 252d Cyberspace Operations Group (Washington ANG)
    - 143rd Information Operations Squadron (Washington ANG)
    - 262nd Cyberspace Operations Squadron (Washington ANG)
  - 102nd Network Warfare Squadron (Rhode Island ANG)
  - 112th Cyberspace Operations Squadron (Pennsylvania ANG)
  - 119th Cyberspace Operations Squadron (Tennessee ANG)
  - 140th Cyberspace Operations Squadron (New Jersey ANG)
  - 166th Network Warfare Squadron (Delaware ANG)
  - 168th Cyberspace Operations Squadron (Iowa ANG)
  - 185th Cyberspace Operations Squadron (Virginia ANG)
  - 224th Cyberspace Operations Squadron (Idaho ANG)
  - 229th Cyberspace Operations Squadron (Vermont ANG)
  - 261st Cyberspace Operations Squadron (California ANG)
  - 272nd Cyberspace Operations Squadron (Michigan ANG)
  - 273rd Information Operations Squadron (Texas ANG)

Marines

- Marine Corps Forces Cyberspace Command
  - Marine Corps Cyberspace Operations Group
  - Marine Corps Cyberspace Warfare Group
  - Joint Task Force Ares
- Marine Forces Reserve
  - Defensive Cybersecurity Operations Company A
  - Defensive Cybersecurity Operations Company B

Coast Guard

- U.S. Coast Guard Cyber Command
- U.S. Coast Guard Office of Cyberspace Forces

Space Force

- Space Delta 6
  - 21st Space Operations Squadron
  - 61st Cyberspace Squadron
  - 62nd Cyberspace Squadron
  - 65th Cyberspace Squadron

== Uruguay ==
- Defense Informatic Security Incidents Response Team (Equipo de Respuesta a Incidentes de Seguridad Informática de Defensa)

== Venezuela ==
- Joint Cyberdefense Directorate (Dirección Conjunta de Ciberdefensa)
  - Cyberdefense Operations Division (División de Operaciones de Ciberdefensa)
  - Information Security Management Division (División de Gestión de Seguridad Informática)
  - Investigation and Development Division (División de Investigación y Desarrollo)

== Vietnam ==
- Cyber Operations Command (Bộ Tư lệnh Tác chiến không gian mạng)
  - 1st Brigade (Lữ đoàn 1)
  - 2nd Brigade (Lữ đoàn 2)
  - 3rd Brigade (Lữ đoàn 3)
  - 10th Laboratory (Viện 10)
- Force 47 (Lực Lượng 47)

== See also ==
- List of CBRN warfare forces
- List of marines and similar forces
- List of mountain warfare forces
- List of paratrooper forces
