= Joanap =

Malware associated with North Korea

Joanap is a remote access tool that is a type of malware used by the government of North Korea. It is two-stage malware, meaning it is "dropped" by another software (in this case the Brambul worm, which was part of the charges against Park Jin Hyok in 2018). Joanap establishes peer-to-peer communications and is used to manage botnets that can enable other operations. On Windows devices that have been compromised it allows data exfiltration, to drop and run secondary payloads, initialization of proxy communications, file management, process management, creation/deletion of directories, and node management.

The US government believes HIDDEN COBRA (a US government term for malicious cyber activity conducted by North Korea) has most likely used Joanap, along with other malware like Brambul since at least 2009. According to the US government compromised IP addresses have been found in Argentina, Belgium, Brazil, Cambodia, China, Colombia, Egypt, India, Iran, Jordan, Pakistan, Saudi Arabia, Spain, Sri Lanka, Sweden, Taiwan, Tunisia.
