= 2014 Sony Pictures hack =

Release of hacked data from Sony Pictures

Sony Pictures hack
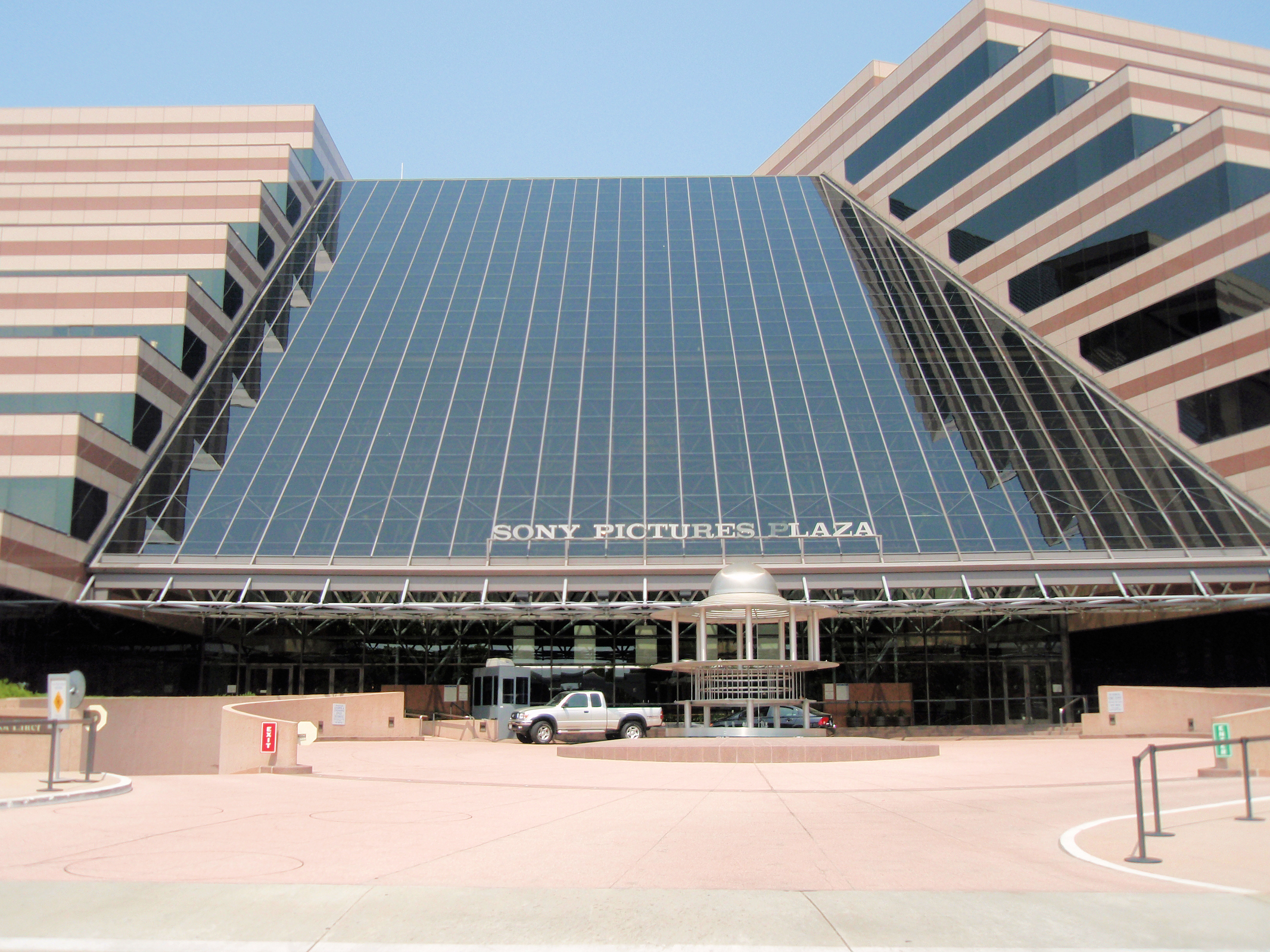
- Sony Pictures headquarters in Culver City, California
- Date: November 24, 2014
- Location: Culver City, California, U.S.
- Type: Cyberattack, data breach
- Theme: Ransomware, data theft, wiper malware
- Target: Sony Pictures Entertainment
- Perpetrators: Guardians of Peace (claimed); North Korea (accused)
- Participants: Sony and the U.S. government

On November 24, 2014, the hacker group "Guardians of Peace" leaked confidential data from the film studio Sony Pictures Entertainment (SPE). The data included employee emails, personal and family information, executive salaries, copies of then-unreleased films, future film plans, screenplays, and other information. The perpetrators then employed a variant of the Shamoon wiper malware to erase Sony's computer infrastructure.

During the hack, the group demanded that Sony withdraw its then-upcoming film The Interview, a political satire action comedy film produced and directed by Seth Rogen and Evan Goldberg. The film stars Rogen and James Franco as journalists who set up an interview with North Korean leader Kim Jong Un only to then be recruited by the CIA to assassinate him. The hacker group threatened terrorist attacks at cinemas screening the film, resulting in many major U.S. theater chains opting not to screen The Interview. In response to these threats, Sony chose to cancel the film's formal premiere and mainstream release, opting to skip directly to a downloadable digital release followed by a limited theatrical release the next day.

United States intelligence officials, after evaluating the software, techniques, and network sources used in the hack, concluded that the attack was sponsored by the government of North Korea, which has since denied all responsibility.

== Hack and perpetrators ==
The exact duration of the hack remains unknown. U.S. investigators said the attackers spent at least two months copying files, while an individual claiming involvement asserted access for up to a year before the breach was discovered in November 2014. The hackers claimed to have taken more than 100 terabytes of data, though this has not been independently verified. The attack involved malware and tools designed to gain persistent access, exfiltrate data, and destroy systems. U.S. cybersecurity officials reported that similar tools had been used in attacks against a major entertainment company, indicating an intent to steal information, cause damage, and erase evidence.

Sony was made aware of the hack on Monday, November 24, 2014, as the malware previously installed rendered many Sony employees' computers inoperable by the software, with the warning by a group calling themselves the Guardians of Peace, along with a portion of the confidential data taken during the hack. Several Sony-related Twitter accounts were also taken over. This followed a message that several Sony Pictures executives had received via email on the previous Friday, November 21; the message, coming from a group called "God'sApstls" [sic], demanded "monetary compensation" or otherwise, "Sony Pictures will be bombarded as a whole". This email message had been mostly ignored by executives, lost in the volume they had received or treated as spam email. In addition to the activation of the malware on November 24, the message included a warning for Sony to decide on their course of action by 11:00 p.m. UTC that evening, although no apparent threat was made when that deadline passed. In the days following this hack, the Guardians of Peace began leaking yet-unreleased films and started to release portions of the confidential data to attract the attention of social media sites, although they did not specify what they wanted in return. Sony quickly organized internal teams to try to manage the loss of data to the Internet, and contacted the Federal Bureau of Investigation (FBI) and the private security firm FireEye to help protect Sony employees whose personal data was exposed by the hack, repair the damaged computer infrastructure and trace the source of the leak. The first public report concerning a North Korean link to the attack was published by Re/code on November 28 and later confirmed by NBC News.

This is absurd. Yet it is exactly the kind of behavior we have come to expect from a regime that threatened to take 'merciless countermeasures' against the U.S. over a Hollywood comedy, and has no qualms about holding tens of thousands of people in harrowing gulags.

— U.S. Ambassador to the U.N. Samantha Power

On December 8, 2014, alongside the eighth large data dump of confidential information, the Guardians of Peace threatened Sony with language relating to the September 11 attacks that drew the attention of U.S. security agencies. North Korean state-sponsored hackers are suspected by the United States of being involved in part due to specific threats made toward Sony and movie theaters showing The Interview, a comedy film about an assassination attempt against Kim Jong Un. North Korean officials had previously expressed concerns about the film to the United Nations, stating that "to allow the production and distribution of such a film on the assassination of an incumbent head of a sovereign state should be regarded as the most undisguised sponsoring of terrorism as well as an act of war."

In its first quarter financials for 2015, Sony Pictures set aside $15 million to deal with ongoing damages from the hack. Sony bolstered its cyber-security infrastructure as a result, using solutions to prevent similar hacks or data loss in the future. Sony co-chairperson Amy Pascal announced in the wake of the hack that she would step down effective May 2015, and instead would become more involved with film production under Sony.

== Information obtained ==
In a notice dated December 8, 2014, Sony Pictures Entertainment (SPE) informed employees that, as of December 1, it had learned that unauthorized individuals may have accessed personally identifiable information, including names, addresses, Social Security numbers, and financial details, during a cyberattack. On December 7, 2014, C-SPAN reported that the hackers stole 47,000 unique Social Security numbers from the SPE computer network.

Although personal data may have been stolen, early news reports focused mainly on celebrity gossip and embarrassing details about Hollywood and film industry business affairs gleaned by the media from electronic files, including private email messages. Among the information revealed in the emails was that Sony CEO Kazuo Hirai pressured Sony Pictures co-chairwoman Amy Pascal to "soften" the assassination scene in The Interview. Many details relating to the actions of the Sony Pictures executives, including Pascal and Michael Lynton, were also released, in a manner apparently intended to spur distrust between these executives and other employees of Sony.

Other emails released in the hack showed Pascal and Scott Rudin, a film and theatrical producer, discussing Angelina Jolie. In the emails, Rudin referred to Jolie as "a minimally talented spoiled brat" because Jolie wanted David Fincher to direct her film Cleopatra, which Rudin felt would interfere with Fincher directing a planned film about Steve Jobs. Pascal and Rudin were also noted to have had an email exchange about Pascal's upcoming encounter with Barack Obama that included characterizations described as racist, which led to Pascal's resignation from Sony. The two had suggested they should mention films about African-Americans upon meeting the president, such as Django Unchained, 12 Years a Slave and The Butler, all of which depict slavery in the United States or the pre-civil rights era. Pascal and Rudin later apologized. Details of lobbying efforts by politician Mike Moore on behalf of the Digital Citizens Alliance and FairSearch against Google were also revealed.

The leak revealed multiple details of behind-the-scenes politics on Columbia Pictures' current Spider-Man film series, including emails between Pascal and others to various heads of Marvel Studios. Due to the outcry from fans, the Spider-Man license was eventually negotiated to be shared between both studios. In addition to the emails, a copy of the screenplay for the James Bond film Spectre, released in 2015, was obtained. Several future Sony Pictures films, including Annie, Mr. Turner, Still Alice, the now cancelled Popeye movie, and To Write Love on Her Arms, were also leaked. The hackers intended to release additional information on December 25, 2014, which coincided with the release date of The Interview in the United States.

According to The Daily Dot, based on the email leaks, while he was at Sony, executive Charles Sipkins was responsible for following senior executives' orders to edit Wikipedia articles about them.

In December 2014, former Sony Pictures Entertainment employees filed four lawsuits against the company for not protecting their data that was released in the hack, which included Social Security numbers and medical information. In 2015, Sony agreed to pay up to $8 million in a settlement with current and former employees to cover identity-theft losses, credit protection services and legal fees. As part of the emails, it was revealed that Sony was in talks with Nintendo to make an animated film based on the Super Mario Bros. franchise.

In January 2015, details were revealed of the MPAA's lobbying of the United States International Trade Commission to mandate U.S. Internet service providers, either at the internet transit level or consumer level internet service provider, to implement IP address blocking of pirate websites as well as linking websites. WikiLeaks republished over 30,000 documents that were obtained via the hack in April 2015, with founder Julian Assange stating that the document archive "shows the inner workings of an influential multinational corporation" that should be made public. Sony condemned the WikiLeaks publication and their attorneys responded by saying it "indiscriminately" disseminated stolen data, and that this "conduct rewards a totalitarian regime seeking to silence dissident speech". The lawyers also said that "WikiLeaks is incorrect that this Stolen Information belongs in the public domain".

In November 2015, after Charlie Sheen publicly announced in a television interview that he had been diagnosed with HIV, it was revealed that Sony executives were aware of the diagnosis as early as March 10, 2014, even though he never told them about it. In December, Snap Inc., due to the hack, was revealed to have acquired Vergence Labs for $15 million in cash and stock, the developers of Epiphany Eyewear, and mobile app Scan for $150 million.

== Threats surrounding The Interview ==
On December 16, for the first time since the hack, the Guardians of Peace mentioned the then-upcoming film The Interview by name, and threatened to take terrorist actions against the film's New York City premiere at Sunshine Cinema on December 18, as well as on its U.S.-wide release date, set for December 25. Sony pulled the theatrical release the following day.

We will clearly show it to you at the very time and places The Interview be shown, including the premiere, how bitter fate those who seek fun in terror should be doomed to. Soon all the world will see what an awful movie Sony Pictures Entertainment has made. The world will be full of fear. Remember the 11th of September 2001. We recommend you to keep yourself distant from the places at that time. (If your house is nearby, you'd better leave.) Whatever comes in the coming days is called by the greed of Sony Pictures Entertainment. All the world will denounce the SONY.

Seth Rogen and James Franco, the stars of The Interview, responded by saying they did not know if it was definitely caused by the film, but later canceled all media appearances tied to the film outside of the planned New York City premiere on December 16, 2014. Following initial threats made towards theaters that would show The Interview, several theatrical chains, including Carmike Cinemas, Bow Tie Cinemas, Regal Entertainment Group, Showcase Cinemas, AMC Theatres, Cinemark Theatres, as well as several independent movie theater owners announced that they would not screen The Interview. The same day, Sony stated that they would allow theaters to opt out of showing The Interview, but later decided to fully pull the national December 25 release of the film, as well as announce that there were "no further release plans" to release the film on any platform, including home video, in the foreseeable future.

On December 18, two messages (both allegedly from the Guardians of Peace) were released. One, sent in a private message to Sony executives, stated that they would not release any further information if Sony never releases the film and removed its presence from the internet. The other, posted to Pastebin, a web application used for text storage that the Guardians of Peace had used for previous messages, stated that the studio had "suffered enough" and could release The Interview, but only if Kim Jong Un's death scene was not "too happy". The post also stated that the company cannot "test [them] again", and that "if [Sony Pictures] makes anything else, [they] will be here ready to fight".

President Barack Obama, in an end-of-year press speech on December 19, commented on the Sony hacking and stated that he felt Sony made a mistake in pulling the film, and that producers should "not get into a pattern where you are intimidated by these acts". He also said, "We will respond proportionally and we will respond in a place and time and manner that we choose." In response to President Obama's statement, Sony Entertainment's CEO Michael Lynton said on the CNN program Anderson Cooper 360 that the public, the press and the President misunderstood the events. Lynton said the decision to cancel the wide release was in response to a majority of theaters pulling their showings and not to the hackers' threats. Lynton stated that they would seek other options to distribute the film in the future, and noted "We have not given in. And we have not backed down. We have always had every desire to have the American public see this movie."

On December 23, Sony opted to authorize approximately 300 mostly-independent theaters to show The Interview on Christmas Day, as the four major theater chains had yet to change their earlier decision not to show the film. The FBI worked with these theaters to detail the specifics of the prior threats and how to manage security for the showings, but noted that there was no actionable intelligence on the prior threats. Sony's Lynton stated on the announcement that "we are proud to make it available to the public and to have stood up to those who attempted to suppress free speech". The Interview was also released to Google Play, Xbox Video, and YouTube on December 24. No incidents predicated by the threats occurred with the release, and instead, the unorthodox release of the film led to it being considered a success due to increased interest in the film following the attention it had received.

On December 27, the North Korean National Defence Commission released a statement accusing Obama of being "the chief culprit who forced the Sony Pictures Entertainment to indiscriminately distribute the movie."

== U.S. accusations and formal charges against North Korea ==
U.S. government officials stated on December 17, 2014 their belief that the North Korean government was "centrally involved" in the hacking, although there was initially some debate within the White House whether or not to make this finding public. White House officials treated the situation as a "serious national security matter", and the FBI formally stated on December 19 that they connected the North Korean government to the cyber-attacks. Including undisclosed evidence, these claims were made based on the use of similar malicious hacking tools and techniques previously employed by North Korean hackers—including North Korea's cyberwarfare agency Bureau 121 on South Korean targets. According to the FBI:

- "[A] technical analysis of the data deletion malware used in this attack revealed links to other malware that the FBI knows North Korea previously developed. For example, there were similarities in specific lines of code, encryption algorithms, data deletion methods, and compromised networks.
- "The FBI also observed significant overlap between the infrastructure used in this attack and other malicious cyber activity the U.S. government has previously linked directly to North Korea. For example, the FBI discovered that several Internet protocol (IP) addresses associated with known North Korean infrastructure communicated with IP addresses that were hardcoded into the data deletion malware used in this attack. The FBI later clarified that the source IP addresses were associated with a group of North Korean businesses located in Shenyang in northeastern China.
- "Separately, the tools used in the SPE attack have similarities to a cyber-attack in March of last year against South Korean banks and media outlets, which was carried out by North Korea."

The FBI later clarified more details of the attacks, attributing them to North Korea by noting that the hackers were "sloppy" with the use of proxy IP addresses that originated from within North Korea. At one point the hackers logged into the Guardians of Peace Facebook account and Sony's servers without effective concealment. FBI Director James Comey stated that Internet access is tightly controlled within North Korea, and as such, it was unlikely that a third party had hijacked these addresses without allowance from the North Korean government. The National Security Agency assisted the FBI in analyzing the attack, specifically in reviewing the malware and tracing its origins; NSA director Admiral Michael S. Rogers agreed with the FBI that the attack originated from North Korea. A disclosed NSA report published by Der Spiegel stated that the agency had become aware of the origins of the hack due to their own cyber-intrusion on North Korea's network that they had set up in 2010, following concerns of the technology maturation of the country.

The North Korean news agency KCNA denied the "wild rumours" of North Korean involvement, but said that "The hacking into the SONY Pictures might be a righteous deed of the supporters and sympathizers with the DPRK in response to its appeal." North Korea offered to be part of a joint probe with the United States to determine the hackers' identities, threatening consequences if the United States refused to collaborate and continued the allegation. The U.S. refused and asked China for investigative assistance instead. Some days after the FBI's announcement, North Korea temporarily suffered a nationwide Internet outage, which the country claimed to be the United States' response to the hacking attempts.

On the day following the FBI's accusation of North Korea's involvement, the FBI received an email purportedly from the hacking group, linking to a YouTube video entitled "you are an idiot!", apparently mocking the organization.

On December 19, 2014, U.S. Secretary of Homeland Security Jeh Johnson released a statement saying, "The cyber attack against Sony Pictures Entertainment was not just an attack against a company and its employees. It was also an attack on our freedom of expression and way of life." He encouraged businesses and other organizations to use the Cybersecurity Framework developed by the National Institute of Standards and Technology (NIST) to assess and limit cyber risks and protect against cyber threats. On the same day, U.S. Secretary of State John Kerry published his remarks condemning North Korea for the cyber-attack and threats against movie theaters and moviegoers. "This provocative and unprecedented attack and subsequent threats only strengthen our resolve to continue to work with partners around the world to strengthen cybersecurity, promote norms of acceptable state behavior, uphold freedom of expression, and ensure that the Internet remains open, interoperable, secure and reliable," he said.

On January 2, 2015, the U.S., under an Executive Order issued by President Obama, installed additional economic sanctions on already-sanctioned North Korea for the hack, which North Korean officials called out as "groundlessly stirring up bad blood towards" the country.

=== Doubts about accusations against North Korea ===
Cyber security expert Kurt Stammberger from cyber security firm Norse, DEFCON organizer and Cloudflare researcher Marc Rogers, Hector Monsegur, and Kim Zetter, a security journalist at Wired magazine, have expressed doubt and tended to agree that North Korea might not be behind the attack.

Michael Hiltzik, a journalist for the Los Angeles Times, said that all evidence against North Korea was "circumstantial" and that some cybersecurity experts were "skeptical" about attributing the attack to the North Koreans. Cybersecurity expert Lucas Zaichkowsky said, "State-sponsored attackers don't create cool names for themselves like 'Guardians of Peace' and promote their activity to the public." Kim Zetter of Wired magazine called released evidence against the government "flimsy". Former hacker Hector Monsegur, who once hacked into Sony, explained to CBS News that exfiltrating one or one hundred terabytes of data "without anyone noticing" would have taken months or years, not weeks. Monsegur doubted the accusations due to North Korea's insufficient internet infrastructure to handle the transfer of that much data. He believed that it could have been either Chinese, Russian, or North Korean-sponsored hackers working outside of the country, but most likely to be the deed of a Sony employee.

Stammberger provided to the FBI Norse's findings that suggest the hack was an inside job, stating, "Sony was not just hacked; this is a company that was essentially nuked from the inside. We are very confident that this was not an attack master-minded by North Korea and that insiders were key to the implementation of one of the most devastating attacks in history." Stammberger believes that the security failure may have originated from six disgruntled former Sony employees, based on their past skill sets and discussions these people made in chat rooms. Norse employees identified these people from a list of workers that were eliminated from Sony during a restructuring in May 2014, and noted that some had made very public and angry responses to their firing, and would be in appropriate positions to identify the means to access secure parts of Sony's servers. After a private briefing lasting three hours, the FBI formally rejected Norse's alternative assessment.

Seth Rogen also expressed doubts about the claims that North Korea was behind the hack. Based on the timeline of events and the amount of information hacked, he believes the hack may have been conducted by a Sony employee. "I've also heard people say that they think someone was hired to do the hack as a way of getting Amy Pascal fired. I don't know if I subscribe to those theories, but I kind of don't think it was North Korea."

=== Other investigations ===
In response to allegations that the intrusion was the result of an inside job, or something other than a state-sponsored cyber attack, computer forensic specialist Kevin Mandia, president of the security firm FireEye, commented that there was not a "shred of evidence" that an insider was responsible for the attack and that the evidence uncovered by his security firm supports the position of the United States government.

In February 2016, analytics firm Novetta issued a joint investigative report into the attack. The report, published in collaboration with Kaspersky Lab, Symantec, AlienVault, Invincea, Trend Micro, Carbon Black, PunchCyber, RiskIQ, ThreatConnect and Volexity, concluded that a well-resourced organization had committed the intrusion, and that "we strongly believe that the SPE attack was not the work of insiders or hacktivists". The analysis said that the same group is engaged in military espionage campaigns.

Because of the depth and scope of malware tools, structure of the analyzed code bases, TTP overlap with similar attacks, and long trail of activities attributed to the Lazarus Group, Novetta does not believe that the SPE attack was carried out by insiders or hacktivists, but rather by a more structured, resourced, and motivated organization. ... Although our analysis cannot support direct attribution of a nation-state or other specific group due to the difficulty of proper attribution in the cyber realm, the FBI's official attribution claims could be supported by our findings.

=== Formal charges ===
The U.S. Department of Justice issued formal charges related to the Sony hack on North Korean citizen Park Jin-hyok on September 6, 2018. The Department of Justice contends that Park was a North Korean hacker that worked for the country's Reconnaissance General Bureau, the equivalent of the Central Intelligence Agency. The Department of Justice also asserted that Park was partially responsible for arranging the WannaCry ransomware attack of 2017, having developed part of the ransomware software. The Department of Justice had previously identified Park and had been monitoring him for some time, but could not indict him immediately as much of the information around him was classified. The Criminal Complaint was unsealed by the US Department of Justice via a press release in September 2018.

== Legal responses ==
Obama also issued a legislative proposal to Congress to update current laws such as the Racketeer Influenced and Corrupt Organizations Act and introduce new ones to allow federal and national law enforcement officials to better respond to cybercrimes like the Sony hack, and to be able to prosecute such crimes compatibly to similar off-line crimes, while protecting the privacy of Americans.

== Public discussion ==
=== About reporting on the hack ===
In December 2014, Sony requested that the media stop covering the hack. Sony also threatened legal action if the media did not comply, but according to law professor Eugene Volokh, Sony's legal threats are "unlikely to prevail". Sony then threatened legal action against Twitter if it did not suspend accounts of people who posted the hacked material. American screenwriter Aaron Sorkin wrote an op-ed for The New York Times opining that the media was helping the hackers by publishing and reporting on the leaked information. On December 18, Reddit banned the subreddit r/SonyGOP that was being used to distribute the hacked files.

=== About pulling The Interview ===
The threats made directly at Sony over The Interview were seen by many as a threat to free speech. The decision to pull the film was criticized by several Hollywood filmmakers, actors, and television hosts, including Ben Stiller, Steve Carell, Rob Lowe, Jimmy Kimmel and Judd Apatow. Some commentators contrasted the situation to the non-controversial release of the 2004 Team America: World Police, a film that mocked the leadership of North Korea's prior leader, Kim Jong Il. The Alamo Drafthouse was poised to replace showings of The Interview with Team America until the film's distributor Paramount Pictures ordered the theaters to stop.

In light of the threats made to Sony over The Interview, New Regency cancelled its March 2015 production plans for a film adaptation of the graphic novel Pyongyang: A Journey in North Korea, which was set to star Steve Carell. Hustler announced its intentions to make a pornographic parody film of The Interview. Hustler founder Larry Flynt said, "If Kim Jong-un and his henchmen were upset before, wait till they see the movie we're going to make".

=== Outside the United States ===
In China, the media coverage of the hackings has been limited and outside sources have been censored. A search for "North Korea hack" on Baidu, China's leading search engine, returned just one article, which named North Korea as "one of several suspects." However, Google, which was and is inaccessible in China, returned more than 36 million results for the same query. Hua Chunying, a spokeswoman of foreign affairs, "shied away from directly addressing" the Sony hacking situation.

== See also ==
- Criticism of Sony
- 2013 South Korea cyberattack
- 2015–16 SWIFT banking hack
- North Korea's illicit activities
