= Park Jin Hyok =

North Korean programmer and hacker

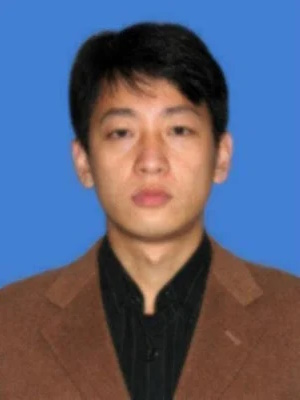
- Photo from Park's FBI wanted poster
- Born: 1984 or 1981
- Occupations: Hacker; programmer
- Organization: Lazarus Group (for Lab 110 / Chosun Expo Joint Venture)
- Criminal charges: Conspiracy to Commit Wire Fraud; Conspiracy to Commit Computer-Related Fraud (Computer Intrusion)

Korean name
- Hangul: 박진혁
- RR: Bak Jinhyeok
- MR: Pak Chinhyŏk

Park Jin Hyok (Korean: 박진혁) is a North Korean programmer and hacker primarily known for his alleged involvement in conducting several extremely expensive computer intrusions. Park is on the FBI's wanted cyber list. The state of North Korea denies his existence, in spite of claims from the FBI.

== Life and career ==
=== Early life ===
According to Park's FBI wanted notice, he was born in either 1984 or 1981. Park attended the Kim Chaek University of Technology, located in Pyongyang. He has traveled to China in the past and conducted IT work for the North Korean company "Chosun Expo" in addition to activities conducted on behalf of North Korea's Reconnaissance General Bureau.

=== Lazarus group and computer hacking ===
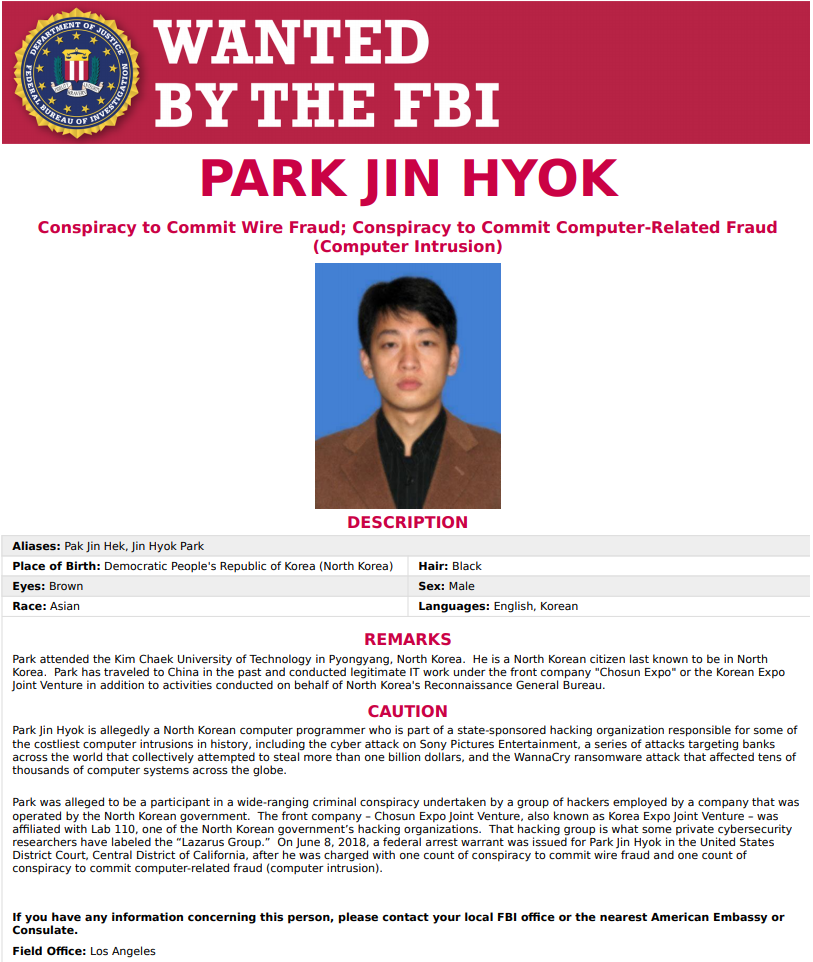
FBI wanted notice

Park is a member of a North Korea's government-funded hacking team known as "Lazarus Group (or APT 38)" and worked for Chosun Expo Joint Venture (aka Korea Expo Joint Venture), a North Korean government front company, to support the North Korean government's malicious cyber actions. The front is affiliated with Lab 110, a component of North Korea's military intelligence and other Expo Joint Venture had offices in China (PRC) and North Korea.

==== Sony Pictures hack ====
In November 2014, the conspirators launched a destructive attack on Sony Pictures Entertainment in retaliation for the movie The Interview, a political action comedy film that depicted the assassination of the supreme leader of North Korea per 2014, Kim Jong Un, by a spy working for the CIA. North Korea denied allegations of hacking.

==== WannaCry ransomware attack ====
The United States Department of Justice has charged Park and other members of the Lazarus group for the WannaCry ransomware attack of 2017, which involved the propagation of ransomware targeting the Microsoft Windows operating system that encrypted all files on any computer it infected after spreading itself to other vulnerable devices on the local network that the compromised computer could access. proceeding which, it would then request ransom payments be made in the form of cryptocurrency in exchange for decryption keys allowing victims to recover their files. The attack affected countless numbers of businesses and organizations throughout the world, including in one incident infecting the United Kingdom's NHS, where nonfunctional computer systems led to thousands of appointments being canceled, before being neutralized by Marcus Hutchins, a British computer security researcher, who had found a kill switch.

== See also ==
- Lazarus Group
- 2009 DDoS attacks against South Korea
- 2013 South Korea cyberattack
- 2014 Sony Pictures hack
- WannaCry ransomware attack
