= Brambul =

Computer worm

Malware details
- Technical name: Trojan:W32.Brambul.[Letter](FBI); Trojan/Brambul-[letter](FBI); W32.Brambul(Symantec); Win32/Brambul(Microsoft); Trojan:Win32/Brambul.[letter](Microsoft)
- Type: Computer worm
- Author: Lazarus

Technical details
- Platform: Windows XP
- Written in: Korean

Brambul is an SMB protocol computer worm that decrypts and automatically moves from one computer to its second computer.

It is responsible for the dropping of the Joanap botnet.

== History ==
Brambul was first discovered in 2009 and has not had a disclosure prior to its notoriety. It was observed by cybersecurity firms and was not extensive subject.

=== Sony hack (Late 2014) ===
Brambul was among the malware to be identified during the Sony Pictures hack.

=== Investigation (Early 2019) ===
Brambul as well as Joanap botnet have both been shut down via a court order.

== Cycle ==
The computer worm has the ability to automatically scan IP addresses and decrypt passwords including, but not limited to the following.

Password	Description
password	The word password
!@#$%	1-5 typed with the shift key
!@#$%^&*()	all ten number keys typed with the shift key
~!@#$%^&*()_+	the entire top row of keys typed with the shift key

=== System drive share ===
Brambul will share information of the system to the cyberattacker. Information shared includes the IP address, hostname and the username and password.
