= Digital Citizens Alliance =

United States non-profit organization

- Headquarters: Washington, D.C., United States
- Executive Director: Tom Galvin
- Website: https://www.digitalcitizensalliance.org/

The Digital Citizens Alliance is a United States non-profit organization focused on internet safety issues. It releases reports focused on malware, credit card theft, online drug sales to teens, piracy, and overall Internet consumer safety.

== History ==
In 2013, Digital Citizens Alliance conducted an expose on online pharmacies selling drugs to minors. This was followed by a report on online drug marketplaces like Silk Road in 2014. The DCA has issued several reports alleging that Google inappropriately profited from advertising revenues on YouTube videos that promote the unlawful sale of controlled substance.

The DCA has conducted reports on whether ad-supported websites were infringing copyrights of movies and television shows. In a report conducted with Media-link the DCA estimated that ad-supported content theft was at least a $227 million business. In 2013, the organization criticized Google for not systematically removing videos from YouTube that were used to perpetrate fraud or provide instructions for buying drugs.

In a December 2015 report commissioned by Digital Citizens, Digital Bait security company RiskIQ reported that 1 in 3 visitors to content theft websites exposed themselves to malware that could lead to identity theft, financial loss, or the possibility to be infected with ransomware. The DCA has also have provided ongoing coverage of the state of darknet markets.

In 2016 and 2017, Digital Citizens worked with state attorneys general on public service announcements to warn consumers about new malware risks from pirate websites and to alert citizens on the proper disposal of unused opioids and other prescription drugs.

In June 2017, Digital Citizens released a report entitled "Trouble in Our Digital Midst" that explored how criminals and bad actors can manipulate digital platforms and offered recommendations on how to protect consumers. These suggestions included greater collaboration to identify and share information on bad actors.

An August 2021 report by the DCA states that online criminals who offer pirated movies, TV shows, games, and live events through websites and apps are profiting $1.34 billion in annual advertising revenues.

In 2025, a DCA investigation revealed the disparity in ticket prices between America and Europe was largely due to the resale market, also noting the high fees (up to $300-$400) platforms like StubHub, Vivid Seats, and SeatGeek charge users to buy tickets from brokers on the secondary market.

== Controversies ==
In 2014, concerns were raised when the organization hired lobbyist Mike Moore, who also served Mississippi Attorney General Jim Hood as a consultant on a pro-bono basis. Jim Hood and the Mike Moore said they were motivated by Google's conduct.

Also in 2014, the DCA reported credit card companies were helping websites offer pirated content for a subscription fee. In September, they commissioned a report via the brand protection organization NetNames reporting how various cyberlocker sites "make millions" in profit. The CEO of cloud storage service Mega said the allegations were "grossly untrue and highly defamatory" and 4shared said the report was "defamatory."
