= Kim Kuk-song =

North Korean defector

Kim Kuk-song (Korean: 김국성) is the pseudonym of a North Korean defector. He served for 30 years in North Korean intelligence agencies and rose to the rank of senior colonel. Kim defected to South Korea following the execution of Jang Song-thaek with whom he had political connections. Following the defection he provided information on a number of intelligence operations he had been involved with.

== Biography ==
Kim Kuk-song is a pseudonym; his real name has not been disclosed. He worked for 30 years in a number of North Korean intelligence agencies and rose to the rank of daechwa (senior colonel). Kim has stated that he personally directed a number of spies to enter South Korea to carry out political subordination in the early 1990s, including one spy who worked for more than five years in the Blue House, residence of the South Korean president. During the 1990s North Korean famine Kim said that he formed a unit to manufacture crystal meth to raise foreign currency for the regime. Kim also stated that he personally directed North Korean personnel to carry out the attempted assassination of defector Hwang Jang-yop in 2010, for which two North Korean majors were arrested and imprisoned by South Korea.

Kim led a privileged life in North Korea. He was permitted to travel abroad freely to sell rare metals and coal, the cash payment for which he carried in his suitcase on his return trip. He had made senior political connections by means of marriage that allowed him to transfer between different North Korean intelligence agencies. He was granted use of a Mercedes-Benz car by Kim Kyong-hui, the sister of Kim Jong Il, leader of North Korea from 1994 to 2011.

Kim Kyong-hui's husband, the senior political figure Jang Song-thaek, was executed by Kim Jong Il's son and new leader Kim Jong Un in 2013. Kim Kuk-song was abroad at the time he discovered this and feared he would be subject to execution under a follow-up purge. Kim subsequently defected to South Korea with his family in 2014. At the time of his defection he was serving with the Reconnaissance General Bureau, North Korea's foreign intelligence agency. He is thought to be the most senior military official to ever defect.

Since his defection, Kim has lived in Seoul. Ahead of the November 2024 US presidential election, he commented on what he believed the risks of a future US president engaging in diplomacy with North Korea were, an act he thought would embolden the regime and risk "sidelining" South Korea.
