= Glocom (defence company) =

Malaysian company for battlefield supplies

Glocom, or Global Communications Co, is a defence company that sells battlefield radio equipment and accessories.

Its website claims it is based in Malaysia. However, in 2017 a United Nations (UN) report, submitted to the United Nations Security Council, claimed that Glocom was a front company for the government of North Korea in order to sell military equipment in violation of United Nations sanctions. The report claimed Glocom appeared to be run by the Democratic People's Republic of Korea (DPRK) company Pan Systems Pyongyang Branch, which was affiliated with the DPRK intelligence agency Reconnaissance General Bureau. In 2017, Pan Systems Pyongyang Branch claimed it had no connection to Glocom and the Malaysian foreign ministry denied that it had violated UN sanctions.

Despite its YouTube channels repeatedly being shut down, Glocom advertised "radar systems, communications software, and military radio gear" on the video streaming service in 2017, 2018 and 2019. It advertised similar equipment on Twitter in 2018 and 2019 and on Facebook in 2019.
