= Information Warfare Division =

Division within the Australian Department of Defence

Agency overview
- Formed: 2017
- Jurisdiction: Commonwealth of Australia
- Headquarters: Canberra, Australia
- Minister responsible: Minister for Defence
- Agency executive: Major General Susan Coyle, CSC, DSM from 2021
- Parent agency: Department of Defence (Australia)
- Website: www.defence.gov.au/jcg/iwd.asp

The Information Warfare Division (IWD) is a division of the Department of Defence tasked with defending Australia's national interests in the information environment.

== Units ==
The Information Warfare Division contains the following branches:

- Joint Integrated Capabilities Branch (JIC)
- Joint Space Services (JSS)
- Joint Command, Control, Communications and Computers (JC4)
- Joint Information Warfare (JIW).

== See also ==
- List of cyber warfare forces
