= Information Technology Company (Belarus) =

- Рота інфармацыйных тэхналогій
- Active: November 2018 – present
- Country: Belarus
- Branch: Armed Forces of Belarus
- Type: Cyber force
- Role: Software development, information security, Internet security, cyberwarfare
- Size: 60 personnel
- Part of: Military Academy of the Republic of Belarus

The Information Technology Company (Belarusian: Рота інфармацыйных тэхналогій), also known simply as the IT Company, is a unit of the Armed Forces of Belarus under the control of the Military Academy of Belarus whose duties include developing software for the needs of the army and ensuring information and network security.

== History and structure ==
On February 25, 2018, Belarusian defense minister General Andrei Ravkov announced that a specialized company would be established in the country to deal with information security issues. In July, the Ministry of Defense announced that it planned to staff it by the end of 2018. The unit became operational in November with around 40 conscripts. About 20 more servicemen arrived in the spring. On December 26, a separate computer classroom. The company is staffed by three platoons of 20 men each.

== Service ==
Selection is competitive. The main requirement is a higher technical education in the field of Information technology. Many former and current military personnel worked in the Belarus High Technologies Park. Candidates must pass an entrance test and receive approval from the Military Academy's Applied Programming Department. Military personnel spend most of their time working on projects, but they also undergo training, which involves both acquiring a professional qualification and acquiring specialized knowledge in the IT industry.
