= 98th Cyberspace Operations Squadron =

The 98th Cyberspace Operations Squadron (98 COS) is an offensive cyber warfare squadron of the United States Air Force Reserve activated on January 2, 2026, at Joint Base San Antonio-Lackland. Lt. Col. Kimberly L. Freeman will be the unit's first commander. The unit is the successor of the 960th Cyberspace Operations Group Detachment 1, a test unit formed in 2024 and will report to the 960th Cyberspace Wing (960 CW). The unit plans to take advantage of their reservists civilian skills to improve the squadron's readiness. The squadron will be composed of former active-duty cyber operators to support offensive cyber missions and active duty cyber operations. Airmen are expected to arrive qualified from regular Air Force units.

== History ==
The 98 COS carries the lineage of the 1000th Signal Company, which provided communication support to the Tuskegee Airmen during World War II.
