= Ofek unit =

Unit Ofek 324
- יחידת אופק
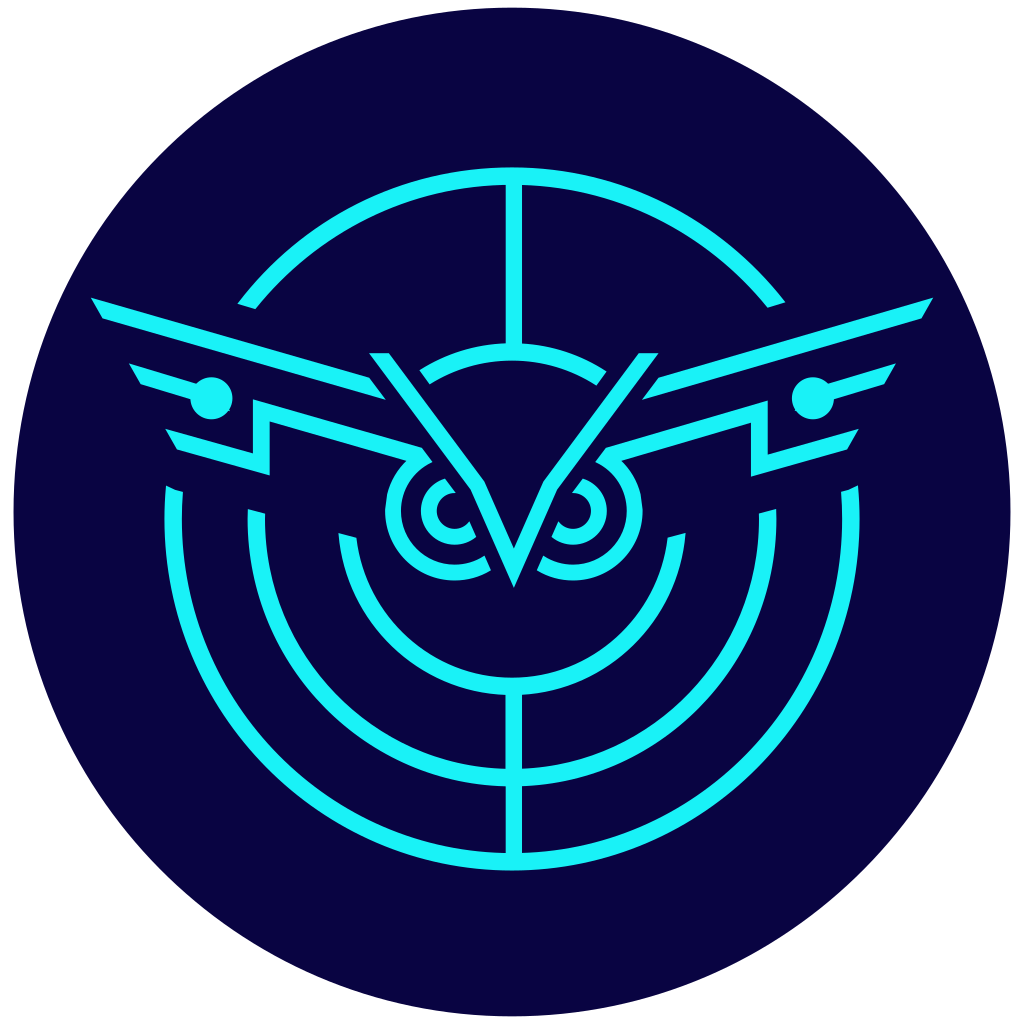
- Founded: 2005
- Country: Israel
- Branch: Israeli Air Force
- Type: operational technology unit
- Part of: Israel Defense Forces
- Garrison/HQ: HaKirya, Tel Aviv
- Motto: "Developing Air Superiority"
- Equipment: Computers

Commanders
- Current commander: Colonel A.

Ofek 324 is the IAF's operational technology unit. It is responsible for developing operational system programs such as command and control systems, cyber warfare, UAV, air defense and aircraft embedded systems.

The unit operates from three different IAF bases and is subordinate to the IAF Equipment Group. It is commanded by an officer with the rank of Colonel (currently identified as Colonel A.).

Ofek was established in December 2005, by merging two former IAF computing units, Unit 180 (founded 1959, responsible for combat support systems) and Mamdas (founded 1967, responsible operational systems).

The unit's first battle was about 6 months after its establishment, during the Second Lebanon War, under Colonel Asahel. In 2015, shifted focus to operational technology and intelligence.

The units emblem is made up of four components:

- The IAF wing emblem
- An owl - a determined animal capable of seeing far into the distance.
- A circular arrow target - related to its role of providing the IAF with significant operational capabilities
- A computer network - representing technology.

== Structure ==
The unit consists of 9 sub-units, each responsible for a different role.

Ofek 324 Structure
Name	Role
Headquarters unit	Responsible for HR management and logistics. Its commander is also Ofek's Deputy Commander. Based in Hakirya and Tzrifin bases.
Service Providing Units
Ma'at unit	Responsible for the continuous availability of the Air Force's networks, and the various systems developed in Ofek. Also responsible for cyber defense. Based in Tzrifin and Hakirya.
Infrastructure Engineering Unit	Responsible for engineering the various infrastructures needed for the unit's systems. Based in Hakirya.
Engineering Unit	Responsible for the testing of new technologies before their implementation in the unit. Also responsible for the UX of some systems, big data, AI, and BI. Based in Hakirya and Tzrifin.
Software Development Units
Ma'am Unit	Responsible for command and control system, used by the IDF's high command. Based in Hakirya.
Matan Unit	Responsible for Air Force intelligence systems. Based in Hakirya.
Matas Unit	Responsible for developing systems for the various squadrons in the IAF, and for UAVs. Placed in Tzrifin.
Mahan Unit	Responsible for air defense systems. Based in Palmachim.
Ma'av Unit	Responsible for embedded Avionics Systems for the aircraft. Based in Tzrifin.
