= Lazarus Group =

Cybercrime organization

- Formation: c. 2009
- Founder: Park Jin Hyok
- Type: Advanced persistent threat
- Purpose: Cyberespionage, cyberwarfare
- Location: Potonggang District, Pyongyang, North Korea (alleged)
- Methods: Zero-days, spearphishing, malware, disinformation, backdoors, droppers
- Parent organization: Lab 110 and Bureau 121
- Affiliations: Bureau 121, Unit 180, AndAriel
- Formerly called: APT38; Gods Apostles; Gods Disciples; Guardians of Peace; ZINC; Whois Team; Hidden Cobra

The Lazarus Group, also known as TraderTraitor, internally called the 414 Liaison Office (Korean: 414 련락소; Hanja: 414 聯絡所; MR: 414 Ryŏnrakso), is a hacker group made up of unknown members, allegedly run by the government of North Korea. While not much is known about the group, researchers have attributed many cyberattacks to them since the 2010s.

Originally deemed a clandestine criminal group, the group has now been designated an advanced persistent threat due to its intended nature, threat, and wide array of methods used when conducting an operation. Names given by cybersecurity organizations include the Guardians of Peace, Whois Team, Hidden Cobra (used by the United States Department of Homeland Security to refer to malicious cyber activity by the North Korean government in general), ZINC, and Diamond Sleet (by Microsoft).

The Lazarus Group has strong links to North Korea. The United States Department of Justice has claimed the group is part of the North Korean government's strategy to "undermine global cybersecurity ... and generate illicit revenue in violation of ... sanctions". North Korea benefits from conducting cyber operations because it can present an asymmetric threat with a small group of operators, especially to South Korea.

== History ==
The earliest known attack that the group is responsible for is known as "Operation Troy", which took place from 2009 to 2012. This was a cyber-espionage campaign that utilized unsophisticated distributed denial-of-service attack (DDoS) techniques to target the South Korean government in Seoul. They were also responsible for attacks in 2011 and 2013. Though uncertain, it is possible that they were also behind a 2007 attack targeting South Korea. A notable attack that the group is known for is the 2014 attack on Sony Pictures. The Sony attack used more sophisticated techniques and highlighted how advanced the group has become over time.

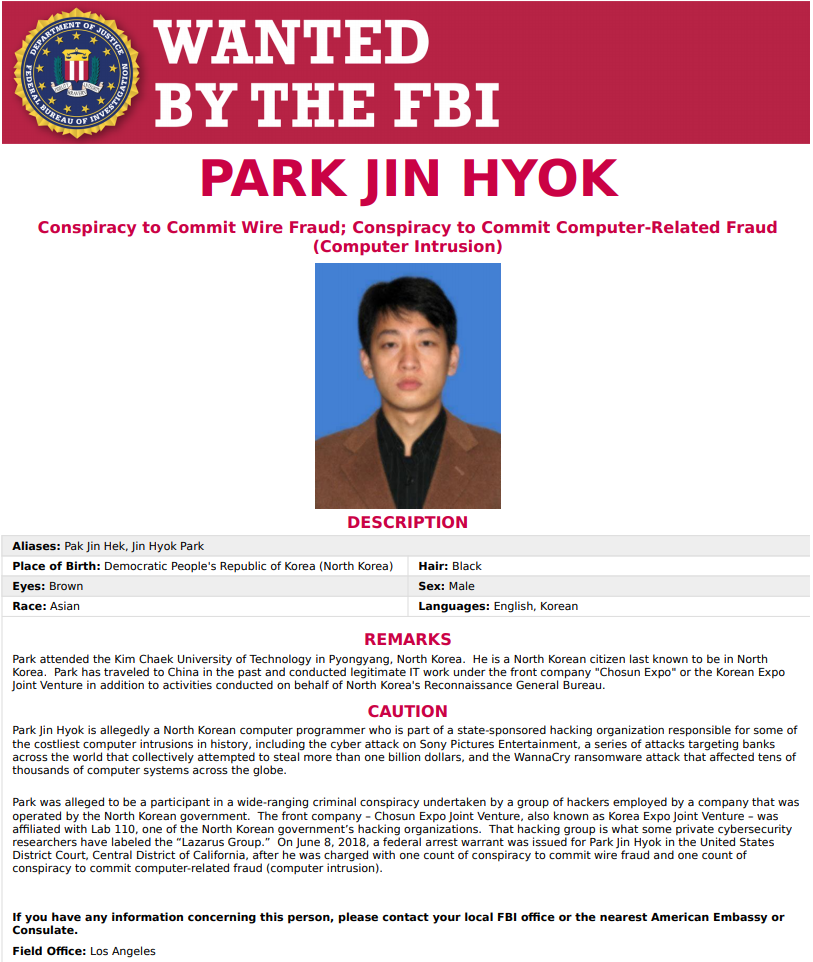
FBI wanted notice for one of the hackers of the Lazarus Group, Park Jin Hyok

The Lazarus Group were reported to have stolen US$12 million from the Banco del Austro in Ecuador and US$1 million from Vietnam's Tien Phong Bank in 2015. They have also targeted banks in Poland and Mexico. The 2016 bank heist included an attack on the Bangladesh Bank, successfully stealing US$81 million and was attributed to the group. In 2017, the Lazarus group was reported to have stolen US$60 million from the Far Eastern International Bank of Taiwan although the actual amount stolen was unclear, and most of the funds were recovered.

It is not clear who is really behind the group, but media reports have suggested the group has links to North Korea. Kaspersky Lab reported in 2017 that Lazarus tended to concentrate on spying and infiltration cyberattacks whereas a sub-group within their organisation, which Kaspersky called Bluenoroff, specialised in financial cyberattacks. Kaspersky found multiple attacks worldwide and a direct link (IP address) between Bluenoroff and North Korea.

However, Kaspersky also acknowledged that the repetition of the code could be a "false flag" meant to mislead investigators and pin the attack on North Korea, given that the worldwide WannaCry worm cyber attack copied techniques from the NSA as well. This ransomware leverages an NSA exploit known as EternalBlue that a hacker group known as Shadow Brokers made public in April 2017. Symantec reported in 2017 that it was "highly likely" that Lazarus was behind the WannaCry attack.

On April 14, 2022, the US Treasury's OFAC placed Lazarus on the SDN List under North Korea Sanctions Regulations section 510.214.

=== 2009 Operation Troy ===
The Lazarus Group's first major hacking incident took place on July 4, 2009, and sparked the beginning of "Operation Troy". This attack utilized the Mydoom and Dozer malware to launch a large-scale, but quite unsophisticated, DDoS attack against U.S. and South Korean websites. The volley of attacks struck about three dozen websites and placed the text "Memory of the Independence Day" in the master boot record (MBR).

=== 2013 South Korea Cyberattack (Operation 1Mission/ DarkSeoul) ===
Over time, attacks from this group have grown more sophisticated; their techniques and tools have become better developed and more effective. The March 2011 attack known as "Ten Days of Rain" targeted South Korean media, financial, and critical infrastructure, and consisted of more sophisticated DDoS attacks that originated from compromised computers within South Korea. The attacks continued on March 20, 2013, with DarkSeoul, a wiper attack that targeted three South Korean broadcast companies, financial institutes, and an ISP. At the time, two other groups going by the personas "NewRomanic Cyber Army Team and WhoIs Team", took credit for that attack. Researchers today identify the Lazarus Group as the supergroup behind the disruptive attacks.

=== Late 2014: Sony breach ===
The Lazarus Group attacks culminated on November 24, 2014. On that day, a Reddit post appeared stating that Sony Pictures had been hacked via unknown means; the perpetrators identified themselves as the "Guardians of Peace". Large amounts of data were stolen and slowly leaked in the days following the attack. An interview with someone claiming to be part of the group stated that they had been siphoning Sony's data for over a year.

The hackers were able to access previously unreleased films, scripts for certain films, plans for future films, information about executive salaries at the company, emails, and the personal information of around 4,000 employees.

=== Early 2016 Investigation: Operation Blockbuster ===
Under the name "Operation Blockbuster", a coalition of security companies, led by Novetta, was able to analyse malware samples found in different cyber-security incidents. Using that data, the team was able to analyse the methods used by the hackers. They linked the Lazarus Group to a number of attacks through a pattern of code re-usage. For example, they used a little-known encryption algorithm available on the internet, the Caracachs cipher algorithm.

=== 2016 Bangladesh Bank cyber heist ===
The Bangladesh Bank cyber heist was a theft that took place in February 2016. Thirty-five fraudulent instructions were issued by security hackers via the SWIFT network to illegally transfer close to US$1 billion from the Federal Reserve Bank of New York account belonging to Bangladesh Bank, the central bank of Bangladesh. Five of the thirty-five fraudulent instructions were successful in transferring US$101 million, with US$20 million traced to Sri Lanka and US$81 million to the Philippines. The Federal Reserve Bank of New York blocked the remaining thirty transactions, amounting to US$850 million, due to suspicions raised by a misspelled instruction. Cybersecurity experts claimed that the North Korea–based Lazarus Group was behind the attack.

=== May 2017 WannaCry ransomware attack ===
The WannaCry attack was a massive ransomware cyberattack that hit institutions across the globe ranging all the way from the NHS in Britain, to Boeing, and even to Universities in China on May 12, 2017. The attack lasted 7 hours and 19 minutes. Europol estimates it affected nearly 200,000 computers in 150 countries, primarily affecting Russia, India, Ukraine, and Taiwan. This was one of the first attacks of a cryptoworm. Cryptoworms are a class of malware that travels between computers using networks, without requiring direct user action for infection – in this case, exploiting TCP port 445. To be infected, there is no need to click on a bad link – the malware can spread autonomously, from a computer to a connected printer, and then beyond to adjacent computers, perhaps connected to the local network, etc. The port 445 vulnerability allowed the malware to move freely across intranets, and infect thousands of computers rapidly. It was also one of the first large scale uses of a cryptoworm.

The virus exploited a vulnerability in the Windows operating system, then encrypted the computer's data in return for a sum of Bitcoin worth roughly $300 to get the key. In order to encourage payment, the ransom demand doubled after three days, and if not paid in a week, the malware deletes the encrypted data files. The malware used a legitimate piece of software called Windows Crypto, made by Microsoft to scramble the files. Once the encryption is completed, the filename has "Wincry" appended, which is the root of the Wannacry name. Wincry was the base of the encryption, but two additional exploits, EternalBlue and DoublePulsar, were used by the malware to make it a cryptoworm. EternalBlue automatically spreads the virus through networks, while DoublePulsar triggered it to activate on a victim's computer.

Security researcher Marcus Hutchins brought the attack to an end when he received a copy of the virus from a friend at a security research company and discovered a kill switch hardcoded into the virus. The malware included a periodic check to see if a specific domain name was registered, and would only proceed with encryption if that domain name did not exist. Hutchins identified this check, then promptly registered the relevant domain at 3:03 pm UTC. The malware immediately stopped propagating itself and infecting new machines. The files were not recoverable after paying the ransom: only $160,000 was collected, leading many to believe that the hackers were not after the money.

The easy kill switch and lack of revenue led many to believe that the attack was state-sponsored. After the attack, security experts traced the DoublePulsar exploit back to the United States NSA, where the exploit had been developed as a cyberweapon. The exploit was then stolen by the Shadow Brokers hacker group, who first tried to auction it off, but after failing to do that, simply gave it away for free. The NSA subsequently revealed the vulnerability to Microsoft, who issued an update on March 14, 2017, two months before the attack occurred. The update was not mandatory and the majority of computers with the vulnerability had not resolved the issue by the time May 12 rolled around, leading to the widespread impact of the attack. The US Department of Justice and British authorities later attributed the WannaCry attack to the Lazarus group.

=== 2017–2019 cryptocurrency attacks ===
In 2018, Recorded Future issued a report linking the Lazarus Group to attacks on cryptocurrency Bitcoin and Monero users mostly in South Korea. These attacks were reported to be technically similar to previous attacks using the WannaCry ransomware and the attacks on Sony Pictures. One of the tactics used by Lazarus hackers was to exploit vulnerabilities in Hancom's Hangul, a South Korean word processing software. Another tactic was to use spear-phishing lures containing malware and which were sent to South Korean students and users of cryptocurrency exchanges like Coinlink. If the user opened the malware it stole email addresses and passwords. Coinlink denied their site or users emails and passwords had been hacked. The report concluded that "This late-2017 campaign is a continuation of North Korea's interest in cryptocurrency, which we now know encompasses a broad range of activities including mining, ransomware, and outright theft ..." The report also said that North Korea was using these cryptocurrency attacks to avoid international financial sanctions.

North Korean hackers stole US$7 million from Bithumb, a South Korean exchange in February 2017. Youbit, another South Korean Bitcoin exchange company, filed for bankruptcy in December 2017 after 17% of its assets were stolen by cyberattacks following an earlier attack in April 2017. Lazarus and North Korean hackers were blamed for the attacks. Nicehash, a cryptocurrency cloud mining marketplace lost over 4,500 Bitcoin in December 2017. An update about the investigations claimed that the attack is linked to the Lazarus Group.

In mid-September 2019, the USA issued a public alert about a new version of malware dubbed ElectricFish. Since the beginning of 2019, North Korean agents have attempted five major cyber-thefts world-wide, including a successful $49 million theft from an institution in Kuwait.

=== Late 2020 pharmaceutical company attacks ===
Due to the ongoing COVID-19 pandemic, pharmaceutical companies became major targets for the Lazarus Group. Using spear-phishing techniques, Lazarus Group members posed as health officials and contacted pharmaceutical company employees with malicious links. It is thought that multiple major pharma organizations were targeted, but the only one that has been confirmed was the Anglo-Swedish-owned AstraZeneca. According to a report by Reuters, a wide range of employees were targeted, including many involved in COVID-19 vaccine research. It is unknown what the Lazarus Group's goal was in these attacks, but the likely possibilities include:

- Stealing sensitive information to be sold for profit.
- Extortion schemes.
- Giving foreign regimes access to proprietary COVID-19 research.

AstraZeneca has not commented on the incident and experts do not believe any sensitive data has been compromised as of yet.

=== January 2021 attacks targeting cybersecurity researchers ===
In January 2021, Google and Microsoft both publicly reported on a group of North Korean hackers targeting cybersecurity researchers via a social engineering campaign, with Microsoft specifically attributing the campaign to the Lazarus Group.

The hackers created multiple user profiles on Twitter, GitHub, and LinkedIn posing as legitimate software vulnerability researchers, and used those profiles to interact with posts and content made by others in the security research community. The hackers would then target specific security researchers by contacting them directly with an offer to collaborate on research, with the goal of getting the victim to download a file containing malware, or to visit a blog post on a website controlled by the hackers.

Some victims who visited the blog post reported that their computers were compromised despite using fully patched versions of the Google Chrome browser, suggesting that the hackers may have used a previously unknown zero-day vulnerability affecting Chrome for the attack; however, Google stated that they were unable to confirm the exact method of compromise at the time of the report.

=== 2022–2023 attacks and transfers ===
In March 2022, the Lazarus Group was found responsible for stealing $620 million worth of cryptocurrencies from the Ronin Network, a bridge used by the Axie Infinity game. The FBI said "Through our investigations we were able to confirm the Lazarus Group and APT38, cyber actors associated with [North Korea], are responsible for the theft".

The FBI confirmed that the North Korean malicious cyber actor group Lazarus (also known as APT38) was responsible for the theft of $100 million of virtual currency from Harmony's Horizon bridge reported on June 24, 2022.

A report published by blockchain security platform Immunefi, alleged that Lazarus was responsible for over $300 million in losses across crypto hacking incidents in 2023. The amount represents 17.6% of the year's total losses.

In June 2023 over $100 million in cryptocurrency was stolen from users of the Atomic Wallet service, and this was later confirmed by the FBI.

In September 2023, the FBI confirmed that a $41 million theft of cryptocurrency from Stake.com, an online casino and betting platform, was perpetrated by the Lazarus Group.

Between June 2023 and February 2024, Huione Pay, whose directors include Cambodian businessman Hun To, received cryptocurrency worth over $150,000, from a digital wallet used by North Korean hacking outfit Lazarus, according to the previously unreported blockchain data reviewed by Reuters.

=== Cryptocurrency exchange hacks ===
According to Indian media reports, a local cryptocurrency exchange named WazirX was hacked by the group and $234.9 million worth of crypto assets have been stolen.

In February 2025, the cryptocurrency exchange Bybit, based in Dubai, was hacked in what became the biggest crypto exchange theft to date. Around 400,000 Ethereum was stolen, worth about US$1.5 billion at the time. The attackers gained access to Bybit's cold wallet system by exploiting a vulnerability in a third-party wallet tool called Safe {Wallet}. According to reports, they tricked wallet signers into approving a fake transaction that gave them control over the funds.

The hack caused a sharp drop in cryptocurrency prices. Ethereum fell by over 20%, and Bitcoin dropped below US$90,000. Many users rushed to withdraw their funds, and some exchanges temporarily paused withdrawals. Regulators in several countries began reviewing how exchanges secure user assets.

Cybersecurity researchers and blockchain analysts linked the attack to the Lazarus Group, a hacking group believed to be backed by North Korea. They tracked the stolen funds through multiple wallets and exchanges and found patterns similar to previous Lazarus operations. The FBI attributed the theft to North Korea, using the name "TraderTraitor" for the North Korean cyber activity involved.

Bybit stated that it was able to recover most of the stolen Ethereum and remained solvent throughout the incident. The company announced new security upgrades and offered a bounty to help track down the hackers and recover the remaining funds.

In October 2026 the cryptocurrency exchange Binance suffered a theft that the FBI attributed to North Korea on October 31, 2026. The FBI said more than US$6 billion in virtual assets had been stolen from the exchange on or about October 29 and referred to the activity as "TraderTraitor", a name also used to track the Lazarus Group. The blockchain intelligence firm TRM Labs estimated that about US$6.36 billion left Binance wallets across ten blockchains, with most of the funds moved within about 20 minutes. TRM said this would make it the largest cryptocurrency theft on record. According to the FBI, the attackers converted the stolen assets mainly into Ether to prepare them for laundering. Binance said about US$3 billion of the affected assets had been frozen.

=== Bitget incident ===
On September 24, 2026, cryptocurrency exchange Bitget suffered a security breach in which approximately US$351.6 million in assets were transferred without authorization from portions of its hot- and warm-wallet infrastructure. Bitget stated that the incident involved the compromise of a critical backend system within its wallet infrastructure. According to the exchange, the attackers spoofed transaction data and used the compromised system to trigger the exchange's authorization process, rather than obtaining the wallets' private keys. The specific method used to gain access to the backend system remained under investigation.

Bitget temporarily suspended withdrawals while investigating the incident and reported that its cold-wallet infrastructure and the majority of its platform assets were unaffected. The exchange said its User Protection Fund, which held more than US$464 million at the time, covered the reported loss.

Bitget CEO Gracy Chen said preliminary investigation indicated that the attackers' activity was consistent with patterns associated with North Korean hacking groups. Some security researchers and media reports subsequently linked the incident to the Lazarus Group or a Lazarus-associated unit. However, as of September 25, 2026, the attribution remained preliminary and had not been conclusively established by an independent investigation.

== Education ==
North Korean hackers are sent vocationally to Shenyang, China for special training. They are trained to deploy malware of all types onto computers, computer networks, and servers. Education domestically includes the Kim Chaek University of Technology, Kim Il Sung University and Moranbong University, which picks the brightest students from across the country and puts them through six years of special education. Beyond the university level, "some of the brightest programmers ... are sent to Moranbong University or Mirim College."

== Units ==
Lazarus is believed to have two units.

=== BlueNorOff ===
BlueNorOff (also known as: APT38, Stardust Chollima, BeagleBoyz, NICKEL GLADSTONE) is a financially motivated group that is responsible for the illegal transfers of money via forging orders from SWIFT. BlueNorOff is also called APT38 (by Mandiant) and Stardust Chollima (by Crowdstrike).

According to a 2020 report by the U.S. Army, Bluenoroff has about 1,700 members carrying out financial cybercrime by concentrating on long-term assessment and exploiting enemy network vulnerabilities and systems for financial gain for the regime or to take control of the system. They target financial institutions and cryptocurrency exchanges, including over 16 organizations in at least 13 countries (Note: "according to press reports, had successfully carried out such operations against banks in Bangladesh, India, Mexico, Pakistan, Philippines, South Korea, Taiwan, Turkey, Chile, and Vietnam") between 2014 and 2021: Bangladesh, Chile, India, Mexico, Pakistan, the Philippines, South Korea, Taiwan, Turkey, and Vietnam. The revenue is believed to go towards the development of missile and nuclear technology.

BlueNorOff's most infamous attack was the 2016 Bangladesh Bank robbery in which they tried to use the SWIFT network to illegally transfer close to US$1 billion from the Federal Reserve Bank of New York account belonging to Bangladesh Bank, the central bank of Bangladesh. After several of the transactions went through (US$20 million traced to Sri Lanka and US$81 million to the Philippines), the Federal Reserve Bank of New York blocked the remaining transactions, due to suspicions raised by a misspelling.

Malware associated with BlueNorOff include: "DarkComet, Mimikatz, Nestegg, Macktruck, WannaCry, Whiteout, Quickcafe, Rawhide, Smoothride, TightVNC, Sorrybrute, Keylime, Snapshot, Mapmaker, net.exe, sysmon, Bootwreck, Cleantoad, Closeshave, Dyepack, Hermes, Twopence, Electricfish, Powerratankba, and Powerspritz"

Tactics commonly used by BlueNorOff include: phishing, backdoors, Drive-by compromise, Watering hole attack, exploitation of insecure out-of-date versions of Apache Struts 2 to execute code on a system, strategic web compromise, and accessing Linux servers. It's reported that they sometimes work together with criminal hackers.

=== AndAriel ===
AndAriel (also spelled Andarial, and also known as: Silent Chollima, Dark Seoul, Rifle, and Wassonite) is logistically characterized by its targeting of South Korea. AndAriel's alternative name is called Silent Chollima due to the stealthy nature of the subgroup. Any organization in South Korea is vulnerable to AndAriel. Targets include government, defense, and any economic symbol.

According to a 2020 report by the U.S. Army, Andarial has about 1,600 members whose mission is reconnaissance, assessment of the network vulnerabilities, and mapping the enemy network for potential attack. In addition to South Korea, they also target other governments, infrastructure, and businesses. Attack vectors include: ActiveX, vulnerabilities in South Korean software, watering hole attacks, spear phishing (macro), IT management products (antivirus, PMS), and supply chain (installers and updaters). Malware used include: Aryan, Gh0st RAT, Rifdoor, Phandoor, and Andarat.

== Indictments ==
In February 2021, the US Department of Justice indicted three members of the Reconnaissance General Bureau, a North Korean military intelligence agency, for having participated in several Lazarus hacking campaigns: Park Jin Hyok, Jon Chang Hyok and Kim Il Park. Jin Hyok had already been indicted earlier in September 2018. The individuals are not in U.S. custody. A Canadian and two Chinese individuals have also been charged with having acted as money mules and money launderers for the Lazarus group.

== See also ==
- Bureau 121
- North Korean remote worker infiltration scheme
- Illicit activities of North Korea
- Kimsuky
- North Korea–United States relations
- Park Jin Hyok
- Ricochet Chollima
- Cryptocurrency and crime
