= Lab 110 =

North Korean hacking group

Lab 110 (Korean: 110연구소) is one of North Korea's government hacking organizations, and it is an operation of the Reconnaissance General Bureau.

== See also ==
- Unit 180
- Bureau 121
