= RiskIQ =

American cyber security company

RiskIQ, Inc.
- Type: Subsidiary
- Founded: 2009; 17 years ago
- Founders: Elias Manousos; Chris Kiernan; David Pon
- Headquarters: San Francisco, California, U.S.
- Parent: Microsoft (2021-present)

RiskIQ, Inc. was a cyber security company that was based in San Francisco, California. It provided cloud-based software as a service (SaaS) for organizations to detect phishing, fraud, malware, and other online security threats.

The company was co-founded in 2009 by Lou Manousos, Chris Kiernan, and David Pon. It received $10 million of Series A funding from Summit Partners in February 2013 and $25 million in series B funding from Battery Ventures in May 2014. RiskIQ was a member of the Cloud Security Alliance (CSA).

RiskIQ monitored advertising networks for malware (malvertising) and spyware and also provided mobile app security services. In May 2018, Standard Bank deployed RiskIQ's software to automate the threat analysis of brand infringement, cybercrime and web-based attacks against its digital presence.

RiskIQ was acquired by Microsoft in July 2021 for more than $500,000,000 (~$585 million in 2025).
