= Unit 180 =

North Korean cyberwarfare cell

Unit 180 (Korean: 180부대) is a North Korean cyberwarfare cell, a component of the Reconnaissance General Bureau.

Kim Heung-kwang, a former computer science professor in North Korea, stated that Unit 180 is likely involved in illicit operations to obtain cash for the regime, such as the Bangladesh Bank robbery and the WannaCry ransomware attack.
