= 91st Cyberspace Operations Squadron =

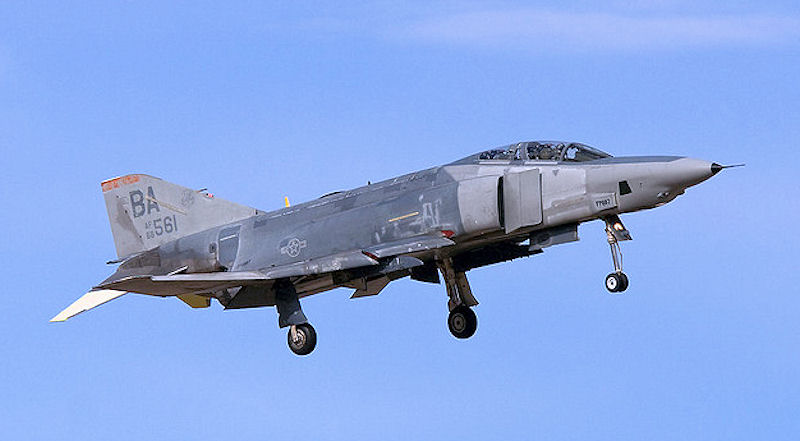
- 91st Tactical Reconnaissance Squadron RF-4C (Note: Aircraft is McDonnell Douglas RF-4C-37-MC Phantom II serial 68-561. Taken in 1992.)
- Active: 1917–1957; 1967–1991; 1993–2005; 2007–present
- Country: United States
- Branch: United States Air Force
- Role: Cyberspace Operations
- Part of: Air Combat Command
- Nickname(s): Demon Chasers
- Engagements: World War I; World War II – American Theater; Korean Service Medal

- Decorations: Distinguished Unit Citation; Air Force Outstanding Unit Award with Combat "V" Device; Air Force Outstanding Unit Award (14x); French Croix De Guerre (World War I); Republic of Korea Presidential Unit Citation

Commanders
- Notable commanders: Captain George C. Kenney Lieutenant Lowell Smith

Insignia
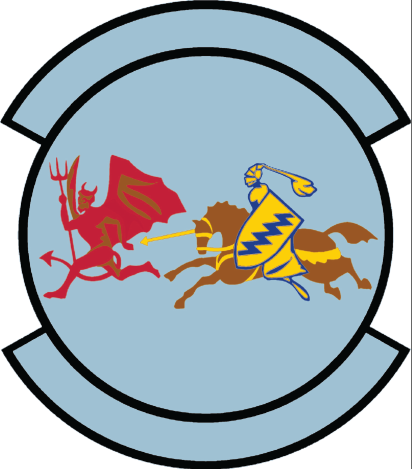
- 91st Cyberspace Operations Squadron emblem (approved 13 April 1995)

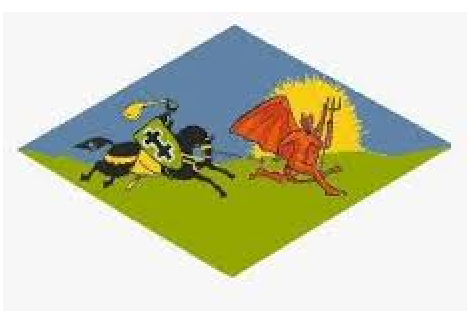
- 91st Observation Squadron emblem (approved 12 February 1924)

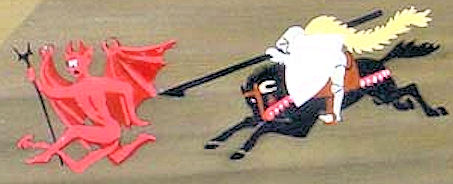
- 91st Aero Squadron fuselage marking (approved 18 November 1918)

The 91st Cyberspace Operations Squadron is an active United States Air Force unit, currently assigned to the 67th Cyberspace Wing at Kelly Annex, part of Lackland Air Force Base, Texas.

The 91st delivers cyber warfare capabilities to combatant commanders. It provides the Air Force with manpower.

== History ==
=== World War I ===
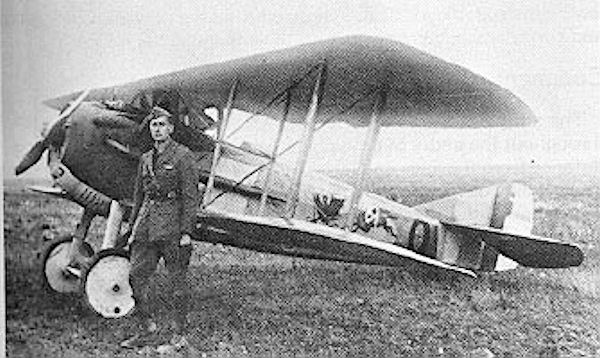
1st Lt. Everett R. Cook, Commanding Officer, 91st Aero Squadron, standing beside his Spad VIII aircraft, 1918

Established as 91st Aero Squadron in the summer of 1917 at Kelly Field, near San Antonio, Texas, the unit was sent to France during World War I as one of the initial American Expeditionary Force aero squadrons. The 91st served on the Western Front in France as an observation squadron with the French Eighth Army and United States First Army, 3 June – 10 November 1918. The primary mission of the 91st Squadron was to gather information and immediately return to base to report it. After the November 1918 Armistice with Germany, the 91st Aero Squadron remained in Europe, as part of the occupation forces in Germany with the Third Army (United States) until April 1919.

=== Intra-War period ===
see also: United States Army Border Air Patrol

After returning to the United States, the squadron was reorganized and assigned to Rockwell Field, near San Diego in September 1919. In California, its duties consisted of patrolling the southwestern U.S./Mexican border between California and Arizona, performing forest fire patrols and flying training flights over forested areas along the coast of California while assigned to Crissy Field, near San Francisco. Between 1919 and 1922 the squadron frequently moved between bases in California and Oregon with detachments deployed locally to meet operational needs.

When Crissy Field closed in 1936 for the construction of the Golden Gate Bridge, the 91st moved to Gray Field, near Fort Lewis, Washington. At Fort Lewis, the squadron continued flying forest fire patrols over the forests of the Pacific Northwest until the late 1930s.

The 91st was reassigned to Wheeler-Sack Army Airfield in upstate New York in September 1941, where it became an observation squadron for the 4th Armored Division. It engaged in overvaluation duties during various maneuvers in New York and Tennessee during buildup of American forces prior to their engagement in World War II.

=== World War II ===
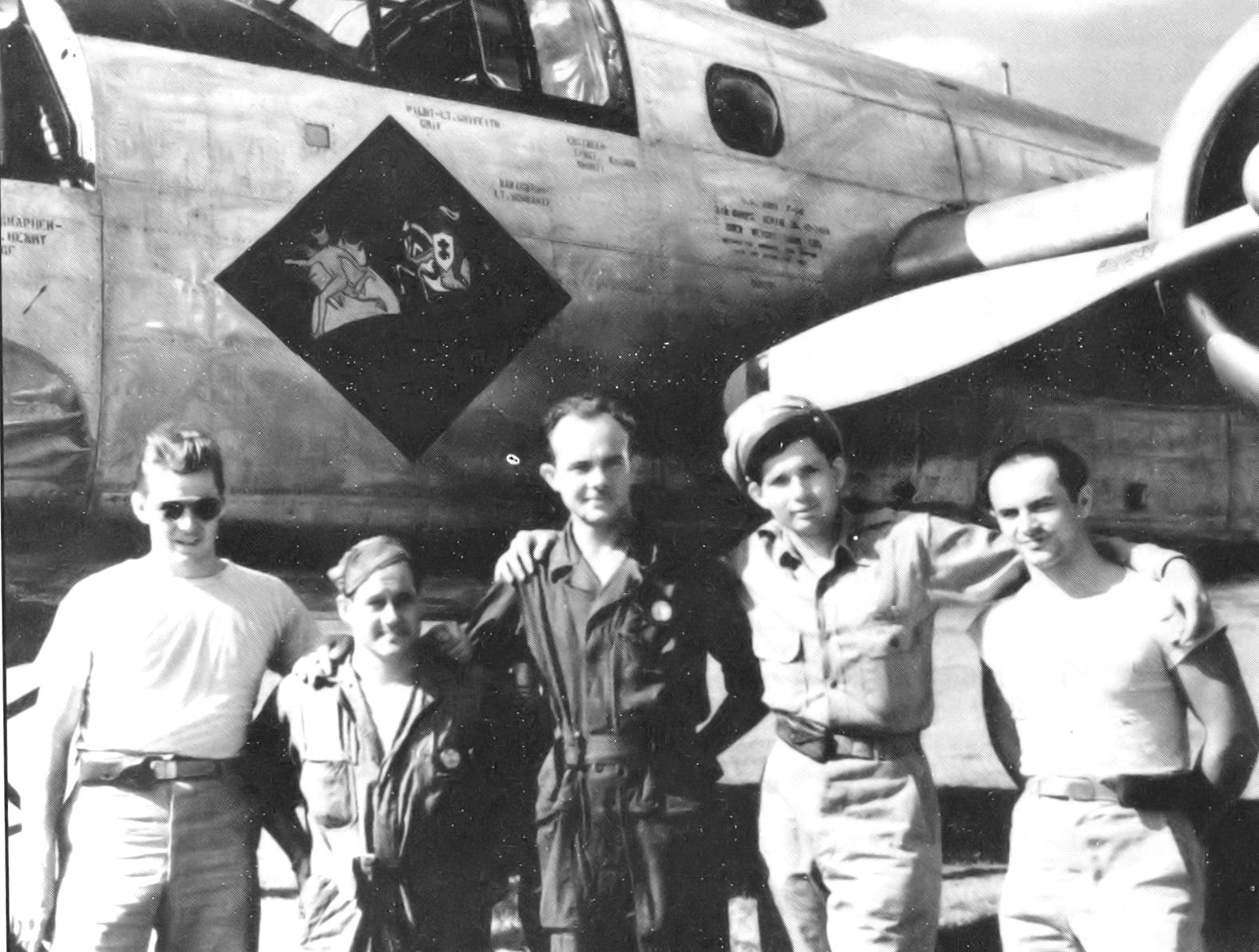
Crew of Flight B, 91st Photographic Mapping Squadron B-25D (Note: Aircraft is North American B-25D-30 Mitchell serial 43-3438. Taken about 1944.)

U.S. civilian and military leaders were concerned with Nazi Germany's preoccupation with South and Central America. In order to prepare for possible hostilities in its own backyard, the military planners needed accurate charts and maps of all of these regions. Millions of square miles were virtually unexplored and uncharted. The 91st was given the tremendous task of getting this job done through aerial photography.

Elements of the 91st Photographic Mapping Squadron were deployed to the Antilles Air Command in April 1943 until June 1945. Flight "B" of the 91st flew throughout South and Central America and the Caribbean. Staging from Borinquen Field, Puerto Rico, aircraft and crews were deployed throughout the area.

Aircraft of Flight "B" saw extensive flight activity over and around such places as Talara, Peru (between 1943 and 1944), Atkinson Field, British Guiana (1944–1945), Recife, Brazil (1944–1945), Howard Field and Albrook Field, Canal Zone (1944–1945) and Natal, Brazil (1945). These operations, mainly aerial mapping, also included intelligence work, providing the United States with a storehouse of cartographic data on these regions that is still in use today.

The 91st was formally attached to the 311th Photographic Wing (later known as the 311th Reconnaissance Wing), and Flight "B" was available to the Sixth Air Force's commander for other duties. The unit flew a variety of North American F-10 "Mitchells" (the photo recon variant of the B-25D) as well as several Boeing F-9s (photo version of the B-17).

Flight "B" was seemingly "everywhere" in the Caribbean region during the war. After the war ended, the squadron was based at MacDill Field, Florida, and later with the 24th Composite Wing at Howard Field, Panama, carrying out photo-mapping and charting missions in Central and South America. The squadron was assigned to the new Strategic Air Command in 1949 and moved to McGuire Air Force Base, New Jersey where it engaged in long-distance photo mapping as part of SAC's global strategic reconnaissance mission.

=== Korean War ===
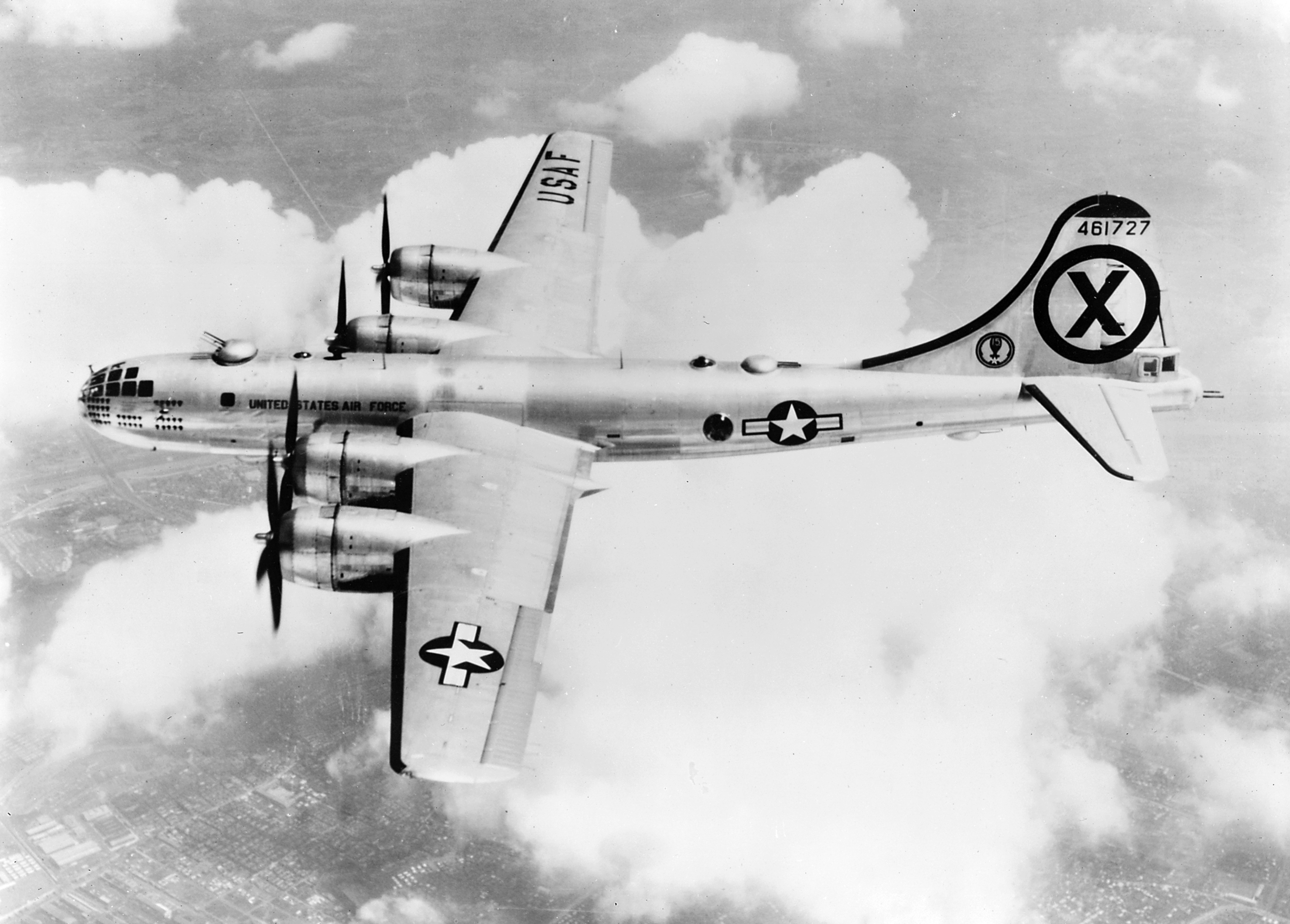
91st Strategic Reconnaissance Squadron RB-29A over Korea. (Note: Aircraft is Boeing RB-29A Superfortress serial 44-61727. This aircraft was shot down by MiG-15s, possibly over China or the extreme northern part of Korea on 4 July 1952. 11 of the crew of 13 were taken prisoner, two crewmembers died.)

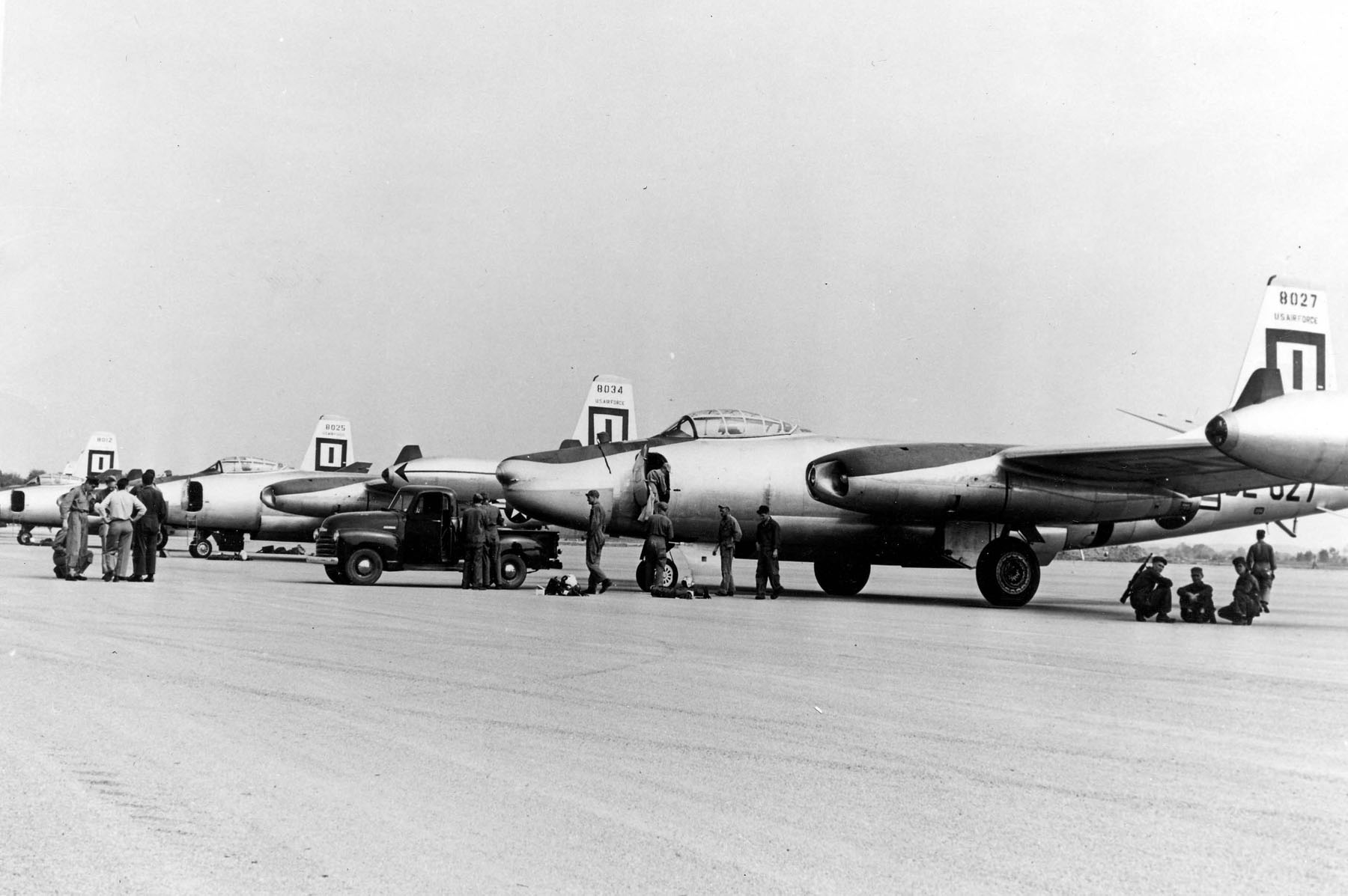
North American RB-45C Tornados of the 91st Strategic Strategic Reconnaissance Squadron

With the invasion of South Korea by communist forces from the north in June 1950, the United Nations (UN) responded by sending military forces, primarily from the United States, to the aid of the South Koreans. A major deficiency in MacArthur's forces was a lack of accurate battlefield maps of the peninsula. As one of the best equipped photo reconnaissance units in the USAF, General MacArthur quickly called on the 91st to join the Far East Air Forces (FEAF) fighting on the Korean peninsula. The 91st Strategic Reconnaissance Squadron moved from McGuire Air Force Base, NJ to Johnson Air Base and Yokota Air Base, Japan to begin supporting UN troops in Korea. It was assigned directly to SAC's Fifteenth Air Force, attached to Fifth Air Force.

The 91st eventually flew the largest number of different airframes in the Korean War and had more assigned personnel than any other flying unit in the Korean War. With over 800 assigned personnel, the squadron had six different types of aircraft assigned, to include the Boeing RB-29 Superfortress and Boeing RB-50 Superfortress, North American RB-45 Tornado, WB-26 Invader, KB-29 tankers and Convair RB-36 Peacemaker. Throughout the conflict, the RB-29 and RB-50s were the workhorses of the unit.

The RB-29 flew throughout the Korean peninsula in the early part of the war, but was soon in trouble with Soviet MiG-15 aircraft added to the air war by the communist forces. The propeller-driven aircraft of the 91st were attacked and suffered extreme damage and battle losses. In response, jet-enhanced RB-50J and jet-powered RB-45C reconnaissance aircraft were deployed from RAF Sculthorpe, England. Other aircraft working from England were detachments of RB-45s temporarily stationed at RAF Manston, Kent an RB-29 unit at RAF Lakenheath and an RB-36 detachment stationed at RAF Brize Norton.

While RB-45 reconnaissance aircraft managed to outrun and outmaneuver MiGs on numerous occasions, they too eventually became targets. Although they were allowed to fly missions to heavily defended northwestern North Korea, after April 1951 they were required to be escorted by Lockheed F-80 Shooting Star and Republic F-84 Thunderjet jet fighter escort aircraft. By January 1952 they were restricted to night operations using flash bombs to illuminate photographic targets. This proved unproductive, however, because when the RB-45 forward bomb bay was open to drop flash bombs, the planes buffeted too badly for accurate photography.

The squadron was also called upon to conduct psychological leaflet drops with its assigned RB-29 aircraft. Not only did the 91st drop Korean "Psyops" leaflets throughout the Korean peninsula and into Manchuria and China, but Russian language leaflets were also dropped as it was suspected that advisers from the Soviet Union were assisting the communist forces.

In addition to bomb damage assessment, targeting and aerial photography for the Bomber Command and FEAF, the 91st conducted Electronic Intelligence (ELINT) and "ferret" missions in theater mapping radar emissions of air defense sites. It conducted the first ferret missions ever by the USAF. Overflights of Soviet-controlled Far East islands began in 1951. An example of this type of work was reconnaissance missions which were conducted over Karafuto following reports that the Soviets had built extensive underground installations and missile-launching facilities on the island. In Project 51, 91st SRW RB-45s took off from Yokotato conduct reconnaissance over the southern portions of Sakhalin Island. Photographic and radar reconnaissance overflight missions were also flown over the Murmansk-Kola Peninsula and Siberia. In late 1952, six RB-36s were sent to Yakota to fly with the 91st and fly high altitude reconnaissance over Manchurian targets.

Shortly after the Korean Armistice Agreement, On 29 July 1953 a 343d Reconnaissance Squadron RB-50 temporarily attached to the 91st was shot down by Soviet fighters about ninety miles south of Vladivostok. The Soviet Union did not deny the plane's location was over water, but claimed that the bomber had twice flown over Soviet territory and fired on their MiGs, who then returned fire defensively. On 7 November 1954, two Soviet fighters attacked a squadron RB-29 over Hokkaido. Nine of the ten crew members were able to bale out of the bomber, which crashed near the town of Kenebetsu. In response to a State Department protest, the Soviets claimed the Superfortress had been intercepted over the Kurile Islands and opened fire on intercepting Soviet fighters, which were compelled to retaliate, then departing "in a southerly direction."

the 91st was withdrawn from the Pacific and returned to the United States and to Great Falls Air Force Base, Montana on 20 December 1954. Elements of the squadron remained with the Fifth Air Force in Japan to provide FEAF with a strategic reconnaissance and intelligence gathering capability. Elements of the 91st were reassigned to the 6091st Reconnaissance Squadron, as part of the newly formed FEAF 6007th Reconnaissance Group that was organized to consolidate many Korean War combat units in Japan after the armistice. The 6007th was a composite group with RB-29, RB-50B, RB-50G, Douglas C-47 Skytrain and Fairchild C-119 Flying Boxcar aircraft assigned to it.

=== FICON project ===
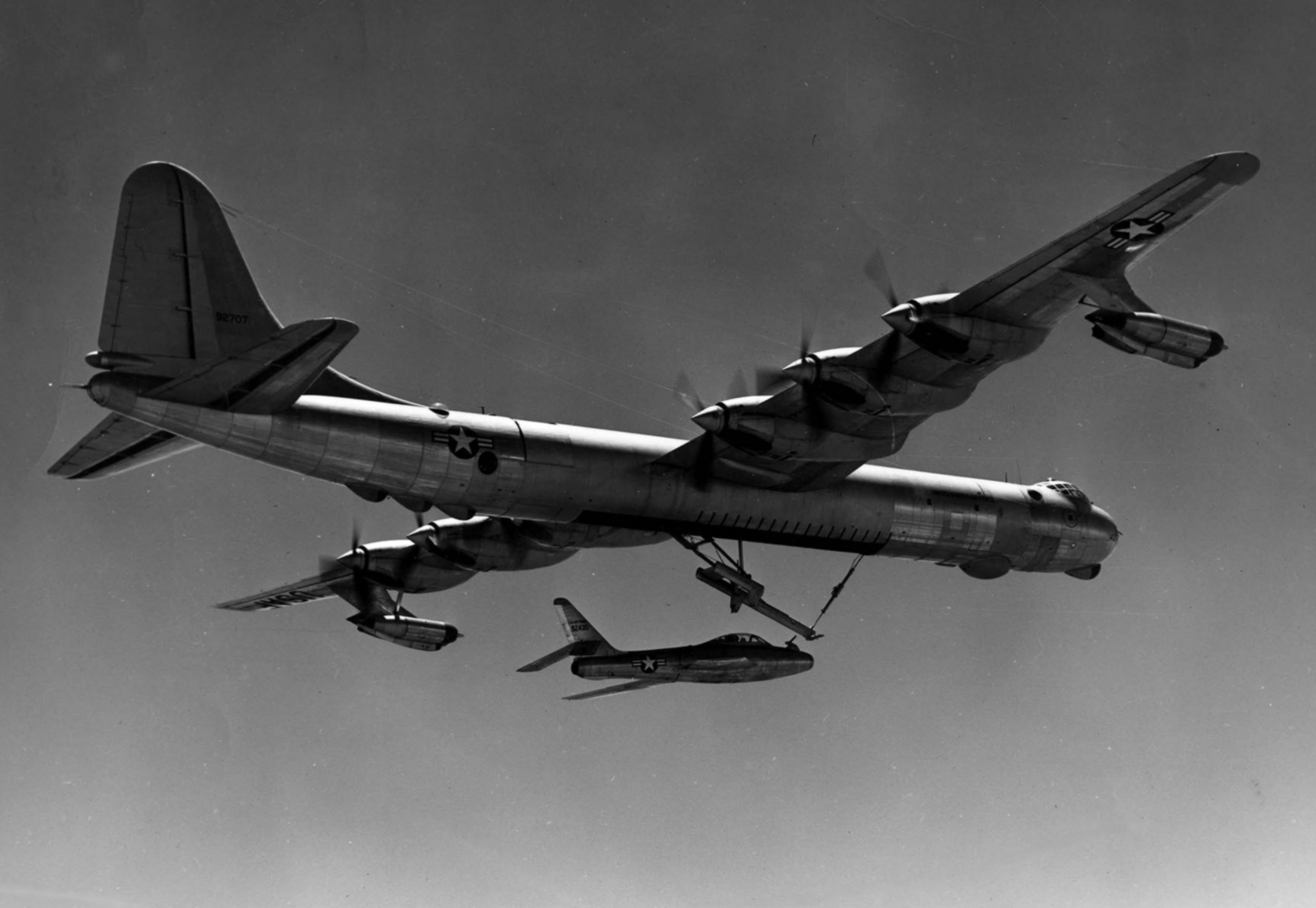
GRB-36 launching YRF-84F from the trapeze. USAF Museum Photo Archives

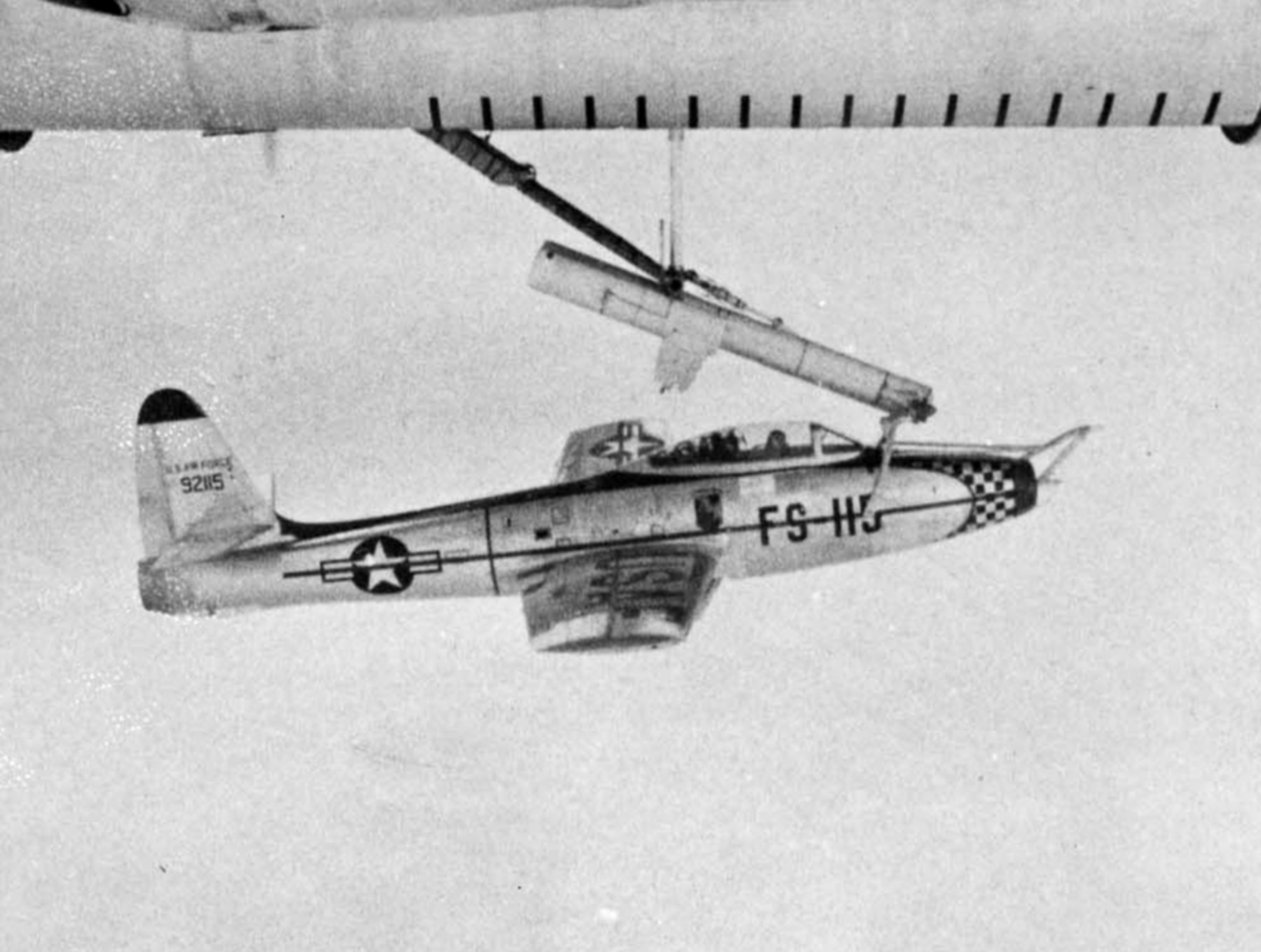
F-84E on FICON trapeze.

Returning to the United States in late 1954, the 91st was tasked with experimenting with parasite fighters to provide long-range escort for B-36 Peacemaker strategic bombers on intercontinental missions. A lesson learned from the Korean War was that American aircraft were often not able to outrun enemy fighters sent up to shoot or force them down. The U.S. needed a faster platform which also had the range of the larger, slower reconnaissance aircraft being used for reconnaissance work.

The 91st conducted an operational procedure called the Fighter-Conveyance (FICON) system. FICON used two aircraft: a B-36 to function as the "mother" ship, providing the range needed, and a modified Republic RF-84F Thunderflash jet aircraft to function as the high-speed reconnaissance aircraft. The specially designed RF-84K would be ferried close to the projected target location, launched in flight, make a high speed pass over the target, then be retrieved and ferried back to its home base of operations. The jet reconnaissance pilots would enter and exit their RF-84 through the B-36's bomb bay to fly away on their reconnaissance missions.

Beginning in 1955, as the 91st SRS tested two F-84 FICON prototypes, the USAF ordered 25 RF-84Ks and began modifying 10 B-36s into GRB-36 FICON carriers. The RF-84K design was a modification of the RF-84F, the USAF's most numerous and advanced tactical reconnaissance aircraft at the time. The only major differences were the RF-84K's retractable hook in the upper part of the nose, rods on either side behind the cockpit, and downward angled horizontal stabilizers (to fit inside the GRB-36's bomb bay).

The RF-84K entered service with the 91st in 1955. For the next year, pilots of the 91st successfully flew their RF-84Ks, but they experienced many near disasters while separating or hooking back up to the GRB-36 carrier aircraft.

Technology soon made this mission obsolete, as the development of the Lockheed U-2 made the need for more vulnerable propeller-driven reconnaissance aircraft obsolete. No longer needed for a long-range, strategic reconnaissance mission, the 91st was inactivated on 1 July 1957.

=== Tactical Air Command ===
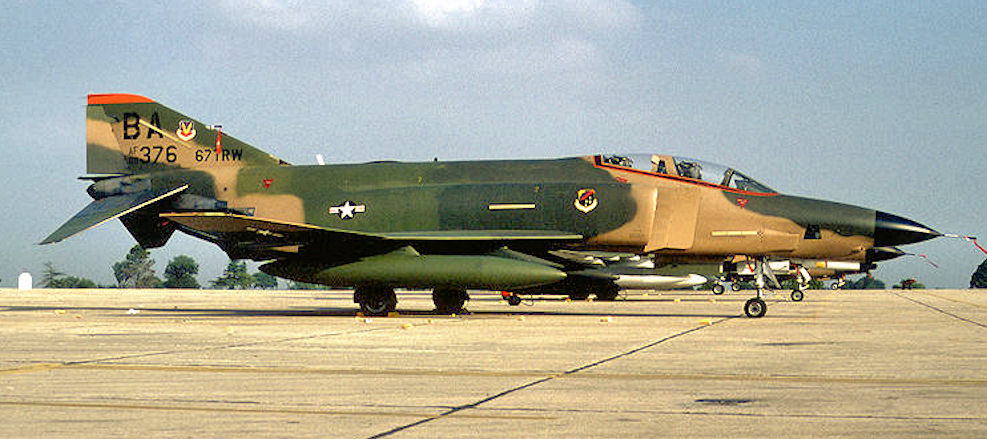
91st TRS RF-4C at Bergstrom AFB aircraft is McDonnell RF-4C Phantom II serial 69-376. Taken in 1973.

The squadron was reactivated as a McDonnell RF-4C Phantom II Tactical Reconnaissance Squadron, performing replacement pilot training in February 1967 and flying tactical reconnaissance missions beginning in July 1971. It conducted reconnaissance training of USAF, US Marine Corps, and allied RF-4 reconnaissance aircrews between 1982 and 1989; acted as adviser to Air National Guard reconnaissance units until 1992; performed reconnaissance missions supporting the US Customs Service beginning in 1983. As part of the closure of Bergstrom AFB and retirement of the RF-4C on 30 August 1991, the 91st was inactivated.

== Lineage ==
- Organized as the 91st Aero Squadron (Observation) on 21 August 1917

Redesignated 91st Squadron (Observation) on 14 March 1921
Redesignated 91st Observation Squadron on 25 January 1923
Redesignated 91st Observation Squadron (Medium) on 13 January 1942
Redesignated 91st Observation Squadron on 4 July 1942
Redesignated 91st Reconnaissance Squadron (Bomber) on 2 April 1943
Redesignated 91st Tactical Reconnaissance Squadron on 11 August 1943
Redesignated 91st Photographic Mapping Squadron on 9 October 1943
Redesignated 91st Photographic Charting Squadron on 17 October 1944
Redesignated 91st Reconnaissance Squadron, Long Range, Photographic on 15 June 1945
Redesignated 91st Strategic Reconnaissance Squadron, Photographic on 25 March 1949
Redesignated 91st Strategic Reconnaissance Squadron, Medium, Photographic on 6 July 1950
Redesignated 91st Strategic Reconnaissance Squadron, Fighter on 20 December 1954
Inactivated on 1 July 1957

- Redesignated 91st Tactical Reconnaissance Squadron on 12 April 1967 and activated (not organized)

Organized on 1 July 1967
Inactivated 30 August 1991
Redesignated 91st Intelligence Squadron and activated on 1 October 1993
Inactivated on 5 May 2005

- Redesignated 91st Network Warfare Squadron on 28 June 2007

Activated on 26 July 2007
Redesignated 91st Cyberspace Operations Squadron on 1 July 2015

=== Assignments ===
- Post Headquarters, Kelly Field, 21 August 1917
- Aviation Concentration Center, 5 October 1917
- American Expeditionary Forces, 10 November 1917
- First Army Observation Group, 13 December 1917
- United States Third Army, 21 November 1918
- 1st Air Depot, American Expeditionary Forces, 17 April 1919
- American Expeditionary Forces, 6 May 1919
- Post Headquarters, Mitchell Field, 17 June 1919
- Southeastern Department, July 1919
- Western Department, September 1919
- Ninth Corps Area, 20 August 1920
- 12th Observation Group (attached to Ninth Corps Area after 1 October 1930)
- Ninth Corps Area, 23 March 1931
- Fourth Army, 3 October 1940
- IX Corps, 9 November 1940
- 73d Observation (later Reconnaissance) Group, 1 September 1941
- 26th Reconnaissance Group, June 1943
- 76th Tactical Reconnaissance Group, 11 August 1943
- 26th Tactical Reconnaissance Group, 23 August 1943
- 1st Photographic Group, 9 October 1943
- 311th Photographic Wing (later Reconnaissance Wing), 5 October 1944
- Caribbean Air Command, 26 August 1946

Flight attached to Joint Brazil-US Military Commission to 30 June 1947

- 24th Composite Wing, 12 January 1948
- 5920th Group (later 5920th Composite Wing), 26 July 1948 (attached to Antilles Air Division)
- Antilles Air Division, 21 October 1948
- Strategic Air Command, 22 January 1949 (attached to 91st Strategic Reconnaissance Wing)
- 91st Strategic Reconnaissance Group, 25 March 1949
- Fifteenth Air Force, 16 November 1950 (attached to Far East Air Forces)
- Far East Air Forces, 1 September 1954
- 6007th Reconnaissance Group, 5 October 1954
- Strategic Air Command, 20 December 1954 (attached to 407th Strategic Fighter Wing) to 15 July 1955
- 71st Strategic Reconnaissance Wing, 24 January 1955 – 1 July 1957
- 75th Tactical Reconnaissance Wing, 1 July 1967 – 15 July 1971
- 67th Tactical Reconnaissance Wing, 15 July 1971 – 30 September 1993
- 694th Intelligence Group, 1 October 1993 – 5 May 2005
- 67th Network Warfare Group (later 67th Cyberspace Operations Group), 26 July 2007 – present

=== Stations ===
==== World War I ====
- Kelly Field, Texas, 21 August 1917
- Aviation Concentration Center, Garden City, New York, 5–27 October 1917
- Chaumont Aerodrome, France, 15 November 1917
- Amanty Airdrome, France, 14 December 1917
- Gondreville-sur-Moselle Aerodrome, France, 24 May 1918
- Vavincourt Aerodrome, France, 21 September 1918

Detachment operated from Souilly Aerodrome, 16 October – November 1918

- Preutin-Higny Aerodrome, France, 21 November 1918
- Trier Airfield, Germany, 4 December 1918
- Coblenz Airfield, Germany, 3 January 1919
- Colombey-les-Belles Airdrome, France, 17 April 1919
- Le Mans, France, 6 May 1919
- Brest, France, 19 May – 3 June 1919

==== Inter-War period ====
- Mitchel Field, New York, 17 June 1919
- Park Field, Tennessee, 4 July 1919
- Rockwell Field, California, 29 September 1919
- Mather Field, California, 3 November 1919
- Ream Field, California, 24 January 1920

Flight, or detachment thereof, operated from El Centro and Calexico, California, 17 March – 30 July 1920

- Rockwell Field, California, 30 April 1920

Flight operated from Eugene, Oregon, and detachment thereof from Medford, Oregon, June-c. September 1920

- Mather Field, California, 3 November 1920

Detachment at Rockwell Field, California, to January 1921

- Eugene, Oregon, May 1921

Detachment operated from Medford, Oregon, and flight from Fort Lewis, Washington, to c. September 1921

- Crissy Field, California, 12 October 1921

Detachment operated from Eugene, Oregon, August–September 1922

- Fort Lewis, Washington, 30 June 1936

==== World War II ====
- Wheeler-Sack Field, New York, 26 September 1941
- William Northern Field, Tennessee, 9 September 1942
- Godman Field, Kentucky, 7 November 1942
- Reading Army Air Field, Pennsylvania, 22 September 1943

Flights at various points in South and Central America during period November 1943 – August 1946, especially at Talara, Peru, 1943–1944, Atkinson Field, British Guiana, 1944–1945, Recife, Brazil, 1944–1945, Howard Field, Panama Canal Zone, 1944–1946, and Natal, Brazil, 1945–1946

- Peterson Field, Colorado, 25 December 1943
- Buckley Field, Colorado, 2 July 1944

==== United States Air Force ====
- MacDill Field, Florida, 21 April 1946
- Howard Field, Panama Canal Zone, 26 August 1946

Flight at Natal, Brazil, to 31 October 1946, and at Rio de Janeiro, Brazil, 31 October 1946 – 23 September 1947; flight at Santiago, Chile, 18 April-c. July 1947

- France Field, Panama Canal Zone, 1 December 1947
- Waller Field, Trinidad, 12 January 1948
- McGuire Air Force Base, New Jersey, 22 January 1949
- Barksdale Air Force Base, Louisiana, 1 October 1949
- Johnson Air Base, Japan, 16 November 1950
- Yokota Air Base, Japan, 19 December 1950
- Great Falls Air Force Base, Montana, 20 December 1954
- Larson Air Force Base, Washington, 17 July 1955 – 1 July 1957
- Bergstrom Air Force Base, Texas, 1 July 1967 – 30 September 1993
- Fort George G. Meade, Maryland, 1 October 1993 – 5 May 2005
- Kelly Annex, Joint Base Lackland-San Antonio, Texas, 26 July 2007 – present

=== Aircraft ===
- Curtiss JN-4, 1917
- Avion de Reconnaissance 1 and 2 (AR 1 AR 2), 1918
- Salmson 2A2 1918–1919
- Breguet 14, 1918–1919
- De Havilland DH-4, 1918–1919, 1919–1928
- Spad XIII, 1918–1919
- O-2, c. 1926–1930
- OA-1 and C-1 during period 1925–1930
- O-25, 1930–1936
- OA-2, C-6, and C-8 during period 1930–1936
- O-46, 1936–1942
- O-47 and O-52, 1941–1942
- O-49, 1941-c.1943
- A-20, 1942–1943
- L-4, 1942–1943
- B-25, 1943
- DB-7, L-5, O-47, and P-40 during period 1942–1943
- B-25/F-10, 1943–1945
- B-17/F-9, 1945–1950
- F-2, 1945–1948
- B-50, 1949–1950
- RB-50, 1950
- RB-29, 1950–1954
- RB-45 and RB-50, 1951–1954
- RBF-84, 1955–1957
- RF-84, 1956–1957
- RF-4, 1967–1991

== See also ==
- List of American Aero Squadrons
- Kingman Douglass
- List of cyber warfare forces
