= 6091st Reconnaissance Squadron =

Inactive United States Air Force unit (1953–1968)

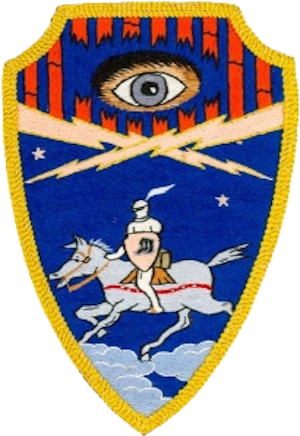
- Emblem of the 6091st Reconnaissance Squadron
- Active: 1953–1968
- Country: United States
- Branch: United States Air Force
- Type: Reconnaissance

The 6091st Reconnaissance Squadron is an inactive United States Air Force unit. Its last was assigned to the 41st Air Division, stationed at Yokota Air Base, Japan. It was inactivated on 1 July 1968.

== History ==
The 6091st participated in overt and covert reconnaissance throughout East Asia during the Cold War. It was formed at the end of the Korean War with the return of the Strategic Air Command 91st Strategic Reconnaissance Squadron to the United States to provide Far East Air Forces with a strategic reconnaissance and intelligence gathering capability.

The squadron was formed from elements of the Strategic Air Command 91st Strategic Reconnaissance Squadron which remained in Far East Air Force (FEAF) after the unit was reassigned after the 1953 Korean War Armistice. The activities of this unit during the 1950s and 1960s are still classified, however it is suspected that the unit was the Pacific Air Forces counterpart of the USAFE 7406th Support Squadron which participated in overt and covert reconnaissance throughout Europe during the Cold War. Indeed, the squadron operated the same type of aircraft as its USAFE counterpart.

In 1957 the squadron was consolidated with its sister 6021st Reconnaissance Squadron and took over the atmospheric sampling mission for Soviet nuclear explosion monitoring. It also presumably took over the mission of the inactivated MATS 581st Air Resupply Group in PACOM. The 6091st was supported administratively and logistically by the host units at Yokota Air Base, but was operationally controlled by Fifth Air Force and HQ PACAF. In 1968 the unit was inactivated, its personnel and assets being absorbed by the 556th Reconnaissance Squadron which operated drones and other reconnaissance aircraft over Southeast Asia during the Vietnam War.

The squadron's present-day successor unit is the 556th Test and Evaluation Squadron, which performs operational testing for unmanned surveillance aircraft (UAS) at Creech AFB, Nevada.

=== Lineage ===
- Established as the 6091st Reconnaissance Flight and activated on 1 December 1953

Re-designated as 6091st Reconnaissance Squadron on 20 December 1954
Inactivated on 1 July 1968

=== Assignments ===
- Fifth Air Force, 1 December 1953
- 6007th Reconnaissance Group (Composite), 1 March 1955
- 6007th Reconnaissance Wing (Composite), 9 August – 30 September 1957
- 67th Tactical Reconnaissance Wing, attached 1 July – 30 September 1957, assigned 1 October 1957
- 3d Bombardment Wing, 8 December 1960
- 41st Air Division, 8 December 1960 – 15 January 1968

=== Stations ===
- Yokota Air Base, Japan, 1 December 1953 – 15 January 1968

=== Aircraft ===
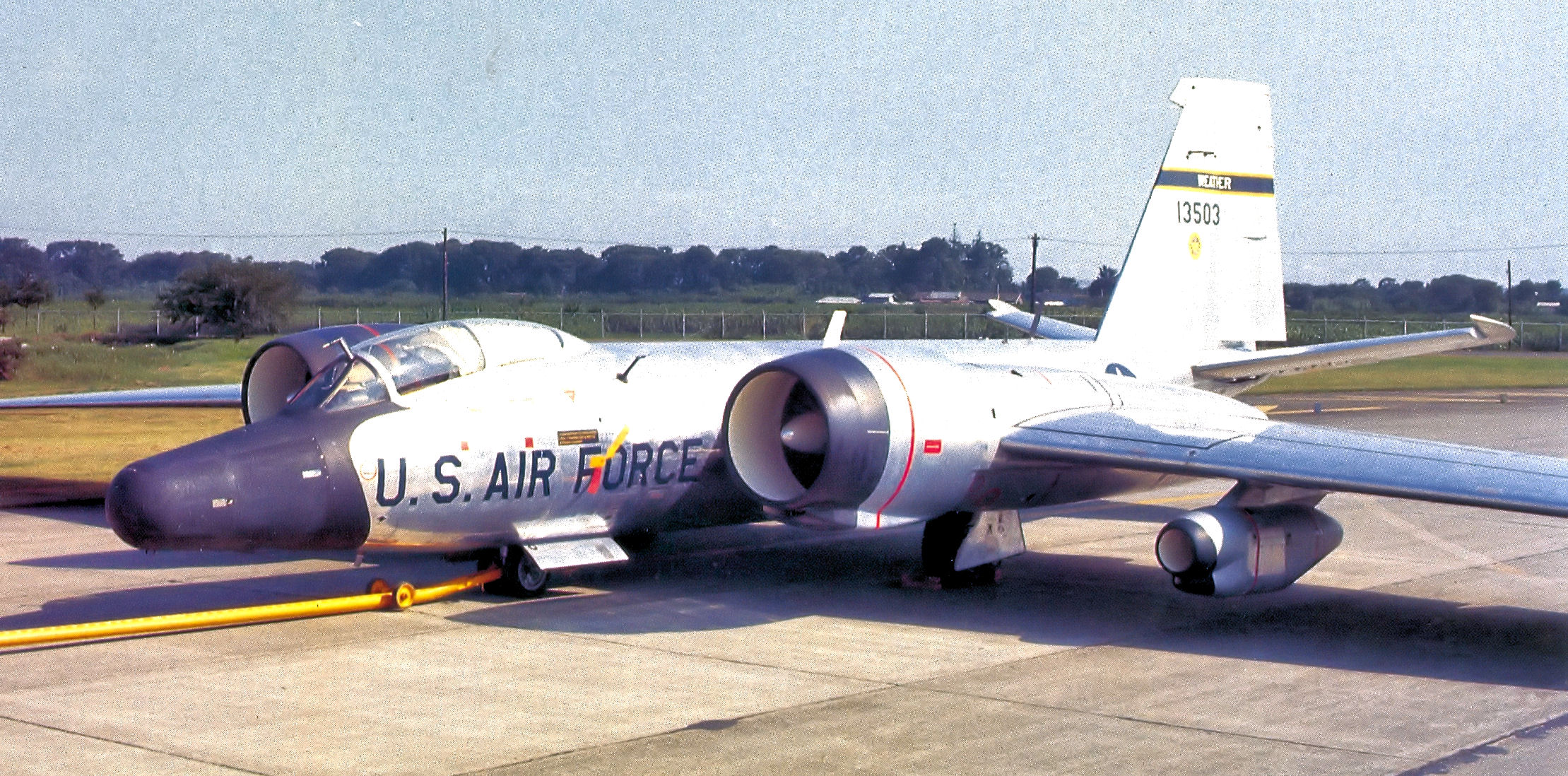
Martin General Dynamics WB-57F 63-13503. Photo taken when aircraft assigned to 6091st Reconnaissance Squadron, Yokota AB, Japan. Aircraft later transferred to NASA, Still in service as NASA 926.

- RB-29 Superfortress (Photo-Recon), 1954
- RB-50B Superfortress (Photo/Weather Recon), 1954–1961
- RB-50G Superfortress (ELINT/Radar Recon), 1954–1961
- RB-45C Tornado, 1954
- RB-57F Canberra, 1965–1968
- C-47 Skytrain, 1954–1968
- C-119G Flying Boxcar, 1954–1968
- C-130B-II Hercules, 1961–1968
- EC-97G Stratofreighter, 1963–1968
