= 41st Air Division =

41st Air Division

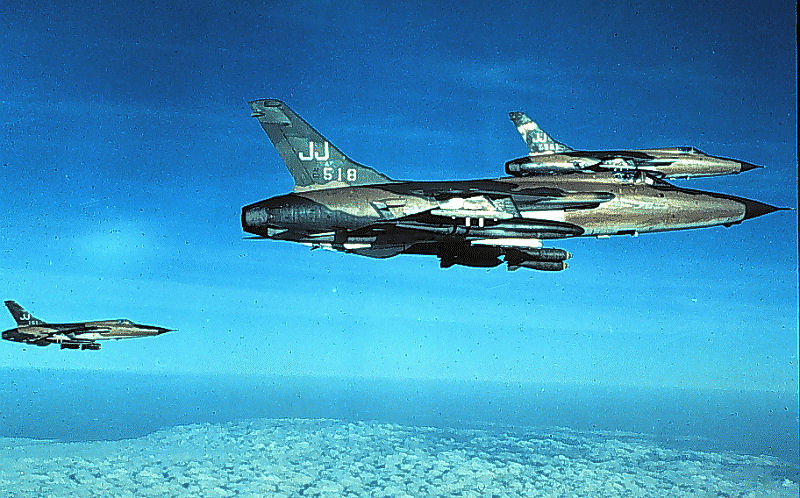
- F-105s of the division's 34th Tactical Fighter Squadron
- Active: 1 March 1952 – 15 January 1968
- Country: United States
- Branch: United States Air Force
- Role: Command of tactical and air defense forces
- Garrison/HQ: see "Stations" section below
- Equipment: see "Aircraft / Missiles / Space vehicles" section below

Insignia
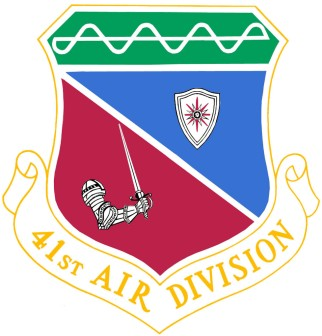
- 41st Air Division emblem (Approved 30 April 1958)

The 41st Air Division is an inactive United States Air Force unit. Its last assignment was with Fifth Air Force at Yokota Air Base, Japan. It was inactivated on 15 January 1968.

== History ==
"The 41st Air Division was organized, administered, equipped, and trained assigned units in Japan from March 1952 – January 1968,. It conducted combined planning with the Japan Air Self Defense Force and, when directed by higher headquarters, joint and combined training with other allied forces. It also developed tactics and examined technical aspects of aerial warfare requirements for new weapons and weapon systems, and improved uses of current weapons."

"In addition, its assigned units carried out aerial surveillance and reconnaissance missions and collected, evaluated, produced and disseminated intelligence data. The division maintained operational control of all United States Navy and United States Marine Corps defense type aircraft, United States Army antiaircraft artillery and surface-to-air missile units in Japan."

"In 1962 it became an operational organization that controlled, evaluated, and exercised assigned units. In fulfilling this role the division participated in exercises such as Commando Night, Commando Rock, Bright Night and Teamwork. In response to the Gulf of Tonkin Incident in 1964, the 41st deployed personnel and aircraft to Southeast Asia. These deployments continued periodically until the unit was inactivated."

== Lineage ==
- Designated 41st Air Division (Defense) and organized, on 1 March 1952

Redesignated 41st Air Division on 18 March 1955
Discontinued and inactivated on 15 January 1968

=== Assignments ===
- Japan Air Defense Force, 1 March 1952;
- Fifth Air Force, 1 September 1954 – 15 January 1968

=== Components ===
Wings

- 3d Bombardment Wing: attached 1 October 1954 – 1 March 1955; assigned 1 March 1955 – 1 February 1957; 10 November 1958 – 8 January 1964
- 8th Tactical Fighter Wing: 10 November 1958 – 1 June 1962
- 35th Fighter-Interceptor Wing: attached 1 March 1952 – 1 March 1955, assigned 1 March 1955 – 1 October 1957 (further attached to 6102 Air Base Wing, 1 July 1957 – 1 October 1957)
- 67th Tactical Reconnaissance Wing: 10 November 1958 – 8 December 1960
- 6441st Tactical Fighter Wing: 10 November 1958 – 8 December 1960

Groups

- 6007th Reconnaissance Group: 1 March 1955 – 9 August 1957

Squadrons

- 8th Bombardment Squadron: 8 January 1964 – 24 April 1964
- 13th Bombardment Squadron: 8 January 1964 – 24 April 1964
- 34th Tactical Fighter Squadron: 15 May 1966 – 15 January 1968
- 35th Tactical Fighter Squadron: 18 June 1964 – 1 April 1965; 15 November 1966 – 15 January 1968
- 36th Tactical Fighter Squadron: 18 June 1964 – 1 April 1965; 15 November 1966 – 15 January 1968
- 39th Fighter-Interceptor Squadron: attached c.1 August 1954 – 30 September 1957, assigned 1 October 1957 – 8 December 1957
- 40th Fighter-Interceptor Squadron: 1 October 1957 – 20 June 1965
- 68th Fighter-Interceptor Squadron: 1 October 1957 – 1 June 1962
- 80th Tactical Fighter Squadron: 18 June 1964 – 1 April 1965; 15 November 1966 – 15 January 1968
- 90th Bombardment Squadron (later, 90 Tactical Fighter): 8 January 1964 – 9 June 1964
- 421st Air Refueling Squadron: 8 December 1960 – 18 February 1965
- 6091st Reconnaissance Squadron: 8 December 1960 – 15 January 1968

=== Stations ===
- Johnson Air Base (later Johnson Air Station), Japan, 1 March 1952
- Yokota Air Base, Japan, 28 June 1962 – 15 January 1968

=== Aircraft ===
- Lockheed F-80 Shooting Star, 1952 – 1954
- North American F-86 Sabre, 1952 – 1961
- Lockheed F-94 Starfire, 1952 – 1954
- Martin B-57 Canberra, 1956 – 1957, 1958 – 1964
- North American F-100 Super Sabre, 1958 – 1962, 1964
- Boeing KB-50 Superfortress, 1958 – 1962
- Boeing RB-50 Superfortress, 1958 – 1961
- Martin RB-57 Canberra, 1958 – 1960
- Douglas RB-66 Destroyer, 1958 – 1960
- McDonnell RF-101 Voodoo, 1958 – 1960
- Douglas SC-47 Skytrain, 1958 – 1960
- Lockheed T-33 T-Bird, 1958 – 1959
- Douglas WB-66 Destroyer, 1958 – 1960
- Convair F-102 Delta Dagger, 1959 – 1965
- Lockheed C-130 Hercules, 1961 – 1962
- Republic F-105 Thunderchief, 1964 – 1968
- McDonnell F-4 Phantom II, 1967 – 1968

=== Service Streamer ===
The unit earned the Korean Service organizational service streamers.

=== Emblem ===
Blazon: Over a shield, divided per bend, azure and gules a cost argent, between a shield of the last ornamented and orled of the second and sable and an arm in armor embowed, gauntleted and brandishing a sword to the sinister all argent; on a chief vert in fess a radio wave pattern argent, the shield and chief edged throughout of the last. (Approved 30 April 1958)

== See also ==
- Fifth Air Force
- List of United States Air Force air divisions
