= 6021st Reconnaissance Squadron =

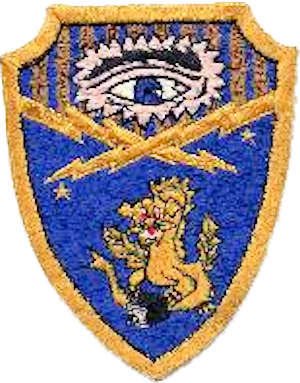
- Emblem of the 6021st Reconnaissance Squadron
- Active: 1953-1957
- Country: United States
- Branch: United States Air Force
- Type: Reconnaissance

The 6021st Reconnaissance Squadron is an inactive United States Air Force unit. Its last was assigned to the 67th Tactical Reconnaissance Wing, stationed at Yokota Air Base, Japan. It was discontinued on 8 December 1957.

== History ==
The 6021st Reconnaissance Squadron participated in overt and covert reconnaissance throughout East Asia during the Cold War. The mission of the squadron was monitoring of the 1953 Cease-Fire in Korea. The establishment of the Korean Demilitarized Zone (DMZ) kept the antagonists at arm's length. In order to ensure that the terms of the armistice were adhered to, it was necessary for the DMZ to be monitored on a daily basis. General Mark W. Clark, commander of the U.S.-Korean-allied coalition forces, and his staff, needed to know details of the enemy's strength, disposition and movements.

Formed in late 1953 at Yokota Air Base, Japan under Fifth Air Force and equipped with some North American RF-86F "Haymaker" photo-reconnaissance jets modified in Japan by fitting a suite of photo-reconnaissance cameras at the Tsuiki REMCO facility in Japan, in a project code-named *Haymaker*. All armament, radars, and gunsights were removed, and a camera suite installed with two K-22 and one K-17 cameras in an under-fuselage installation. The cameras were mounted vertically, which took the main body of the camera and the film magazines outside the fuselage contours in a bulge on the gun bay door. A total of eight were built (serial numbers 52–4337, 4379,4492, 4800, 4808, 4822, 4823, and 4864). They were flown over North Korea on clandestine reconnaissance missions after the war ended.

The length of service for the RF-86s was not long, as the Air Force chose the RF-84F Thunderflash as its standard tactical reconnaissance aircraft, these aircraft were eventually sold to Japan in 1956 and replaced with F-84Fs. The Sabres were operated by the Japanese 501st Tactical Reconnaissance Squadron at Iruma Air Base where they remained in service until 25 March 1977.

The squadron also had a flight of seven specialized RT-33As equipped with sniffer gate valves and filters installed in the nose cone of the tips. A probe measuring lopsided electrons was mounted in the left gun port with a corresponding meter in the back seat. The gate valves could be operated from either cockpit. Their mission was to fly one sortie every day up the coast to Chitose and back. The purpose, was of course, to sniff out lopsided electrons and "glow-in-thedark" debris from the Soviet nuclear bomb testing program.

The 6021st played host to detachments of specialized reconnaissance aircraft, designed for penetration of un-friendly airspace:

=== RF-100A Slick Chick ===
The RF-100A was a modification program of F-100A Super Sabres which taken off the production line during September 1954 and modified as unarmed photographic reconnaissance aircraft. Only six of these aircraft were produced, with the aircraft carrying four drop tanks rather than the usual two because the mission profile called for a lot of high-speed flight under afterburner and there was no provision for midair refuelling. Initially sent to USAFE in 1955 to the 7407th Support Squadron in West Germany, they flew a number of successful missions over non-friendly territory in Eastern Europe. In 1957, three of the aircraft were transferred to PACAF, and assigned to the 6021st Reconnaissance Squadron (53–1546, 53–1547, and 53–1548). 1548 was lost during a checkout flight during June 1957. The other two aircraft were flown by the squadron on undisclosed missions until September when they were transferred to Johnson AB. from which they were eventually transferred to Taiwan in December 1958 along with two additional aircraft from West Germany. It is generally believed that these aircraft flew operational reconnaissance missions over the People's Republic of China. The (Nationalist) Republic of China Air Force often passed the information gained by these reconnaissance flights along to US intelligence agencies. Again, there are few details publicly available about these missions.

=== Heartthrob Project ===
The Heartthrob project was high-altitude reconnaissance program to obtain photographic imagery over non-friendly areas of the Asian mainland in 1955. The aircraft used was a modified RB-57 Canberra, equipped with higher-thrust J65-W-7 engines, one T-11 vertical mapping camera, and two K-38, 36 inch focal length oblique cameras with 10 – 15% overlap. The modified aircraft was referred to as an RB-57A-1. The altitude at which the RB-57s were to operate was between 50,000 and 62,000 feet. At any height above 50,000 feet cabin decompression means death. The activation of the pressure suit would sustain life until the pilot could get down to a safe altitude.

A flight of four RB-57A-1s were deployed to Yokota AB in September 1955. The Heartthrob detachment became part of the 6021st Reconnaissance Squadron. The 6021st flew RF-86F Sabre Haymaker aircraft, RB-45s and T-33s adding, at approximately the same time as the RB-57As arrived; the unit received three RF-100A Super Sabres. Although the pilots who had comprised the 6021st detachment at Yokota had joined the project with experience of the B-57; none of them had had any reconnaissance training. The first thing they had to do over the initial weeks in Japan was to acquire this training. For two months the pilots learned how to take pictures. Come mid November they were ready to go.

The first Far East overflight took place on 26 November 1955. The flight was to be staged from Chitose Air Base. with the aircraft equipped with external tip tanks It was to be a complete radio silence mission. If radio silence was broken within the first 30 minutes the back up aircraft would be launched. The mission profile was briefed to fly north from Chitose and along the eastern side of the island of Sakhalin far enough seaward and at an altitude of 100 feet to avoid radar detection. This profile was to continue to a point abreast the northern portion of the island where the tip tanks would be jettisoned and a climb initiated to the maximum obtainable altitude. Somewhere in the climb a 180 degree turn would be started in order to arrive over the northern tip of the island headed south at an altitude of about 55,000 feet. At this point a reconnaissance run would be flown down the entire length of the island with specific pinpoint targets and lines. The flight would then continue on to Hokkaido, break radio silence, and land at Chitose. The aircraft would be refuelled and the film left in place for an immediate return to Yokota AB. There, the film would be down loaded by the 548th Reccy Tech Squadron for processing and photo interpretation.

Another flight on 11 December used three RB-57s was approved in which the aircraft entered Soviet airspace simultaneously from three different locations near Vladivostok and overflew three different targets. Contrary to Air Force hopes, the bombers were picked up on Soviet radar, and MiG-17s scrambled to intercept them; but the Americans were out of reach. In the exposed film returned to the intelligence community, the fighters were clearly visible, pirouetting in the thin air beneath the bombers. The resulting protest on 14 December left no doubt about the capabilities of Soviet air defenses to detect and identify aircraft:

"On December 11, 1955, between 1307 and 1321 o’clock, Vladivostok time, three American jet planes, type B-57, coming from... the Sea of Japan, south of Vladivostok, violated the... air space of the Soviet Union.... Good weather prevailed in the area violated, with good visibility, which precluded any possibility of the loss of orientation by the fliers during their flight.... The Government of the Soviet Union... insists that the Government of the USA, take measures to punish the guilty parties and to prevent any future violations of the national boundaries of the U.S.S.R. by American planes."

Four days after the Soviet note was delivered, an exasperated president met with United States Secretary of State John Foster Dulles to consider the embarrassing situation and decide on a course of action. Dulles had to say, under the circumstances, that it would he difficult for the country to deny the RB-57 overflights. But President Dwight D. Eisenhower would not consent to such an admission. Instead, he instructed Colonel Andrew Goodpaster to relay an order to Secretary of Defense Charles Wilson, JCS chairman Gen. Nathan Twining, and Central Intelligence Agency director Allen Dulles: "Effective immediately, there are to be no flights by U.S. [military] reconnaissance aircraft over Iron Curtain countries."

The secrecy which surrounded the Heartthrob operations precluded discussion between pilots about targets and mission details. Over the forty five years since the missions took place secrecy was still considered imperative. Two RB-57A-1s were sent to Kadena AB to train four Taiwanese pilots in the art of high altitude recce. From Okinawa they moved to Taipei and Taoyuan Air Base. On the third mission over the People's Republic of China one of the aircraft was shot down over the Shantung Peninsula and the project was abandoned.

=== Inactivation ===
The parent 6007th Reconnaissance Group was absorbed by the 67th Tactical Reconnaissance Wing in late 1957 as a budgetary and consolidation of forces decisions. The squadron was inactivated, its RF-84Fs and RB-57As were transferred to its sister the 6091st Reconnaissance Squadron and inactivated in December 1957.

== Lineage ==
- Designated as the 6021st Photo Mapping Flight and organized on 1 December 1953

Redesignated as 6021st Reconnaissance Squadron on 20 December 1954
Discontinued on 8 December 1957

== Assignments ==
- Fifth Air Force, 1 December 1953
- 6007th Reconnaissance Group (Composite), 1 March 1955
- 6007th Reconnaissance Wing (Composite), 9 August-8 December 1957
- 67th Tactical Reconnaissance Wing, attached 1 July-8 December 1957

== Stations ==
- Johnson Air Base, Japan, 1 December 1953
- Yokota Air Base, Japan, 20 December 1954 – 8 December 1957

== Aircraft ==
- RB-50G Superfortress (Project Orchid, ELINT/Radar Recon), 1953–1956
- RF-86F Sabre (Haymaker), 1953–1956
- RF-80C Shooting Star, 1954–1955
- RT-33A Shooting Star (Project Cottonseed, Air sampling) 1954–1957
- RB-57A-1 Canberra (Heartthrob), 1955–1957
- RF-84F Thunderstreak, 1956–1957
- RF-100A Super Sabre (Slick Chick), 1957–1957
