= 67th Cyberspace Wing =

United States Air Force unit

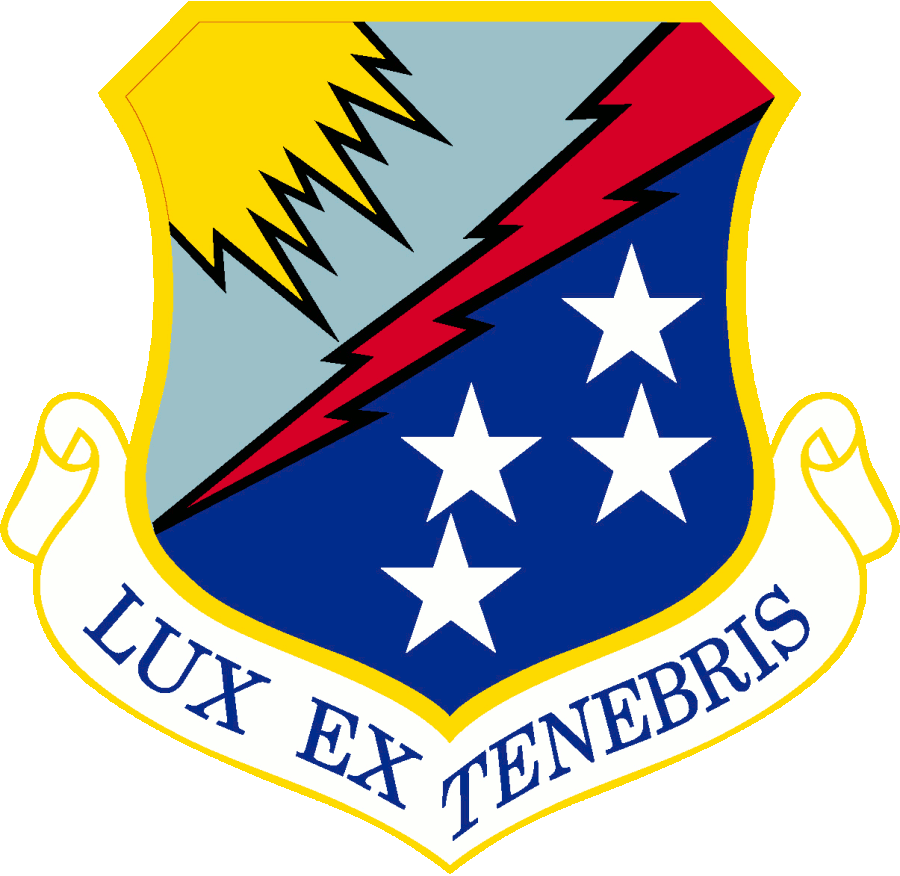
- Wing emblem
- Active: 1947–1949; 1951–1960; 1966–1993; 1993 – present
- Country: United States
- Branch: United States Air Force
- Type: Specialized mission wing
- Role: Information operations
- Part of: Air Combat Command (Sixteenth Air Force)
- Headquarters: Joint Base San Antonio-Lackland, Texas
- Motto: Lux ex tenebris (Latin for 'Light from darkness')
- Decorations: Air Force Outstanding Unit Award with V Device; Air Force Outstanding Unit Award; Distinguished Unit Citation; Republic of Korea Presidential Unit Citation
- Website: Official website

Commanders
- Current commander: Colonel John W. Picklesimer

The 67th Cyberspace Wing is a United States Air Force wing stationed at Lackland Air Force Base, Texas. It was activated in October 1993 as a military intelligence unit and is assigned to the Sixteenth Air Force.

The wing was first activated at March Field as the 67th Reconnaissance Wing as part of the wing base organization system. However, only its 67th Tactical Reconnaissance Group ever became operational and it relied on another wing for support. It was inactivated in the 1949 Truman reductions in the Department of Defense budget.

In February 1951, the wing was reactivated in Japan as the 67th Tactical Reconnaissance Wing, replacing the 543d Tactical Support Group as the headquarters for tactical reconnaissance units during the Korean War. It moved to Korea and served in combat until the armistice was signed in July 1953. Following the war, it returned to Japan and by 1957 was the only reconnaissance unit assigned to Far East Air Forces. The wing was inactivated in 1960 and its remaining squadrons were assigned to other units.

In 1966, the wing was reactivated at Mountain Home Air Force Base, Idaho and trained for reconnaissance missions. It became Tactical Air Command's replacement training unit for the McDonnell RF-4C Phantom II. From 1968 to 1970, it acquired a fighter unit and also trained fighter aircrews on the F-4. In July 1971, Mountain Home became a fighter base and the wing moved without personnel or equipment to Bergstrom Air Force Base, Texas, where it absorbed the assets of the 75th Tactical Reconnaissance Wing, which was inactivated. It continued its reconnaissance mission at Bergstrom until inactivating on 30 September 1993. The wing reactivated the following day at Kelly Air Force Base as the 67th Intelligence Wing under Air Intelligence Agency and continued the electronic intelligence mission. It has been redesignated multiple times since then, including a change to 67th Information Operations Wing and being assigned to Eighth Air Force. It was later redesignated as the 67th Network Warfare Wing. When the Twenty-Fourth Air Force was activated in 2009, it was reassigned from Eighth Air Force to Twenty-Fourth Air Force. It is currently assigned to Sixteenth Air Force and is currently designated as the 67th Cyberspace Wing.

== Mission ==
The 67th Cyberspace Wing operates, manages, and defends global Air Force networks. The wing trains and readies airmen to execute computer network exploitation and attack. It also executes full-spectrum Air Force network operations, training, tactics, and management. It provides network operations and network warfare capabilities to Air Force, joint task force, and Unified Combatant Commands. Additionally, it performs electronic systems security assessments for the Air Force.

The wing comprises four groups and a support squadron.

- The 67th Cyberspace Operations Group provides forces to conduct Air Force computer network operations for United States Strategic Command, United States Cyber Command and other combatant commands. The group conducts computer network operations and warfare planning for the Air Force, joint task forces and combatant commanders. The group also conducts Secretary of Defense-directed special network warfare missions.
- The 318th Cyberspace Operations Group's role is to innovate, partner and deliver combat capability in, through and from cyberspace through the development, testing, training and operational employment of materiel and non-materiel solutions.
- The 567th Cyberspace Operations Group prosecutes cyberspace operations and provides mission assurance for national, joint and service-level mission partners.
- The 867th Cyberspace Operations Group executes defensive cyber operations (DCO) to Protect The Nation, including US allies and joint partners.
- The 67th Operations Support Squadron executes operational support for the 67th Cyberspace Wing and all Cyber Protection Teams. This unit develops and standardizes operations training, synchronization and management of the wing's exercise, weapons and intelligence and tactics programs.

== Component units ==
Unless otherwise indicated, units are based at Joint Base San Antonio, Texas, and subordinate units are located at the same location as their commanding group.

67th Wing Staff

- 67th Operations Support Squadron

67th Cyberspace Operations Group

- 91st Cyberspace Operations Squadron
- 305th Cyberspace Operations Squadron (Fort Gordon, Georgia)
- 352nd Cyberspace Operations Squadron (Joint Base Pearl Harbor-Hickam, Hawaii)
- 367th Cyberspace Operations Squadron
- 375th Cyberspace Operations Squadron
- 390th Cyberspace Operations Squadron

318th Cyberspace Operations Group

- 39th Information Operations Squadron (Hurlburt Field, Florida)
- 90th Cyberspace Operations Squadron
- 318th Range Squadron
- 346th Test Squadron

567th Cyberspace Operations Group

- 92nd Cyberspace Operations Squadron
- 834th Cyberspace Operations Squadron
- 835th Cyberspace Operations Squadron (Scott Air Force Base, Illinois)
- 837th Cyberspace Operations Squadron (Scott Air Force Base, Illinois)

867th Cyberspace Operations Group

- 315th Cyberspace Operations Squadron (Fort George G. Meade, Maryland)
- 341st Cyberspace Operations Squadron (Fort George G. Meade, Maryland)
- 833rd Cyberspace Operations Squadron
- 836th Cyberspace Operations Squadron

== History ==
The wing's origins trace back to the activation of the 67th Observation Group in August 1941.

As a wing, it was first activated in November 1947 as the 67th Reconnaissance Wing at March Field, California during the experimental implementation of the wing base organization. (Note: Although the wing base organization called for a combination of the tactical group with all base units supporting it, two wings were organized at March, each with separate support units assigned. See Mueller, p. 371 (listing support units organized at March in 1947).) It was made a permanent unit and redesignated the 67th Tactical Reconnaissance Group in August 1948. (Note: The emblem was approved 20 March 1952.) During this period, only the wing's 67th Tactical Reconnaissance Group was operational and the entire wing was attached to the 1st Fighter Wing. The wing was equipped with various models of the Douglas B-26 Invader, North American F-6 Mustang and Lockheed F-80 Shooting Star. President Truman's reduced 1949 defense budget required reductions in the number of groups in the Air Force to 48 and the wing was inactivated in March 1949.

=== Korean War and service in the Pacific ===
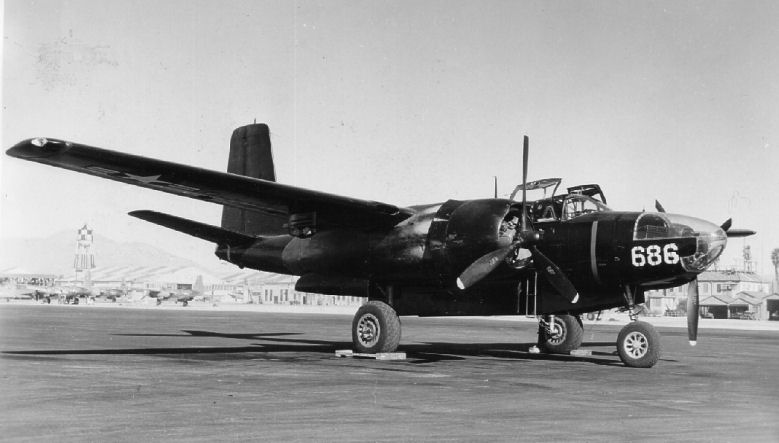
12th Squadron RB-26 Invader

By 1951, Fifth Air Force had combined its reconnaissance units under the 543d Tactical Support Group, which was stationed in Korea. In late January, the 543d headquarters moved to Komaki Air Base Japan, and the following month it was inactivated and the 67th was activated in its place and absorbed its personnel and equipment. The 543d's 45th Tactical Reconnaissance Squadron was transferred to the 67th, while its other squadrons were replaced by newly activated units.

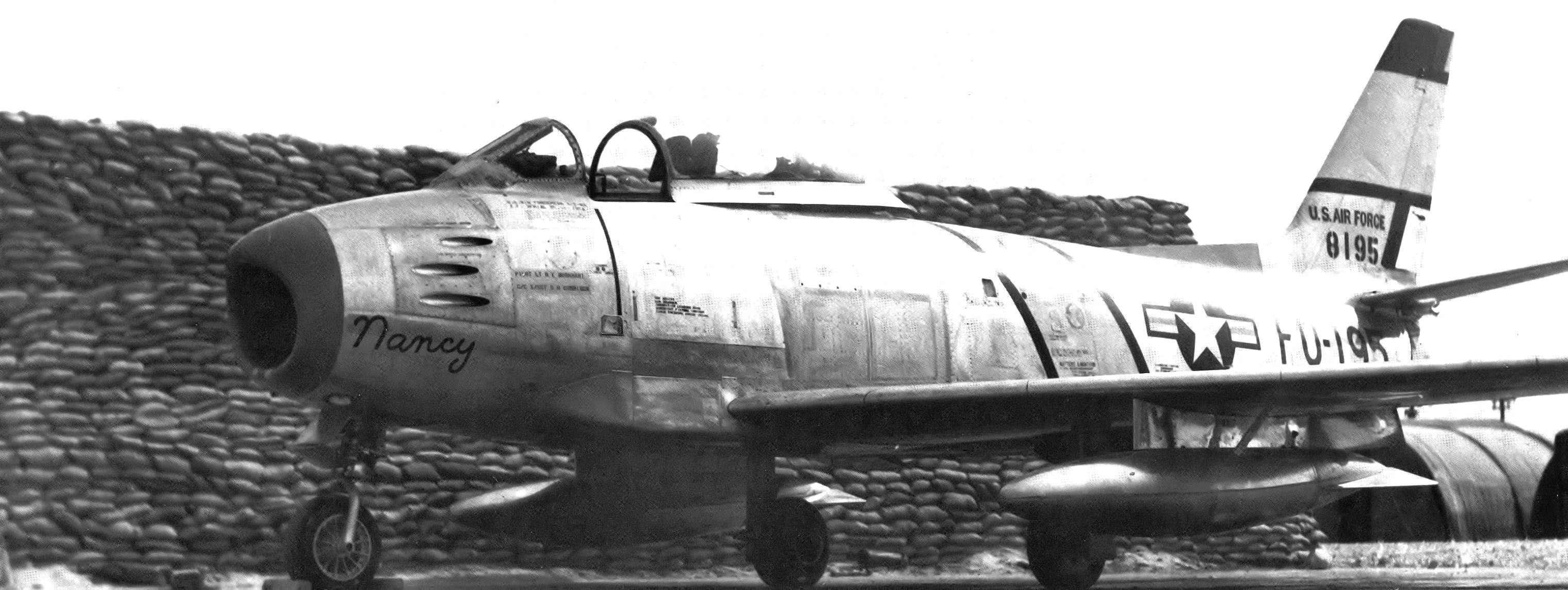
One of the six RF-86s flown by the wing (Note: Aircraft is North American RF-86A-5-NA Sabre serial 48-195.)

The wing immediately began to fly combat reconnaissance missions over Korea, By August, the wing had consolidated its subordinate elements at Kimpo Air Base. Gradually overcoming difficulties, it soon was providing adequate aerial intelligence for both air and ground units. However, the wing was hampered by a lack of suitable photographic equipment and aircraft and shortages of trained personnel. For a short time, the wing had to use North American T-6 Texan trainers and Douglas C-47 Skytrain cargo planes for visual reconnaissance. The wing sought to cure its problems using resources within the theater, managing its own training classes for inexperienced personnel and experimenting with aircraft, cameras and tactics. It sought to cure its lack of high speed reconnaissance aircraft by acquiring six Sabres modified for reconnaissance missions.

The 67th continued flying combat missions until the armistice in late July 1953. It provided photographic coverage of enemy front lines, battlefield positions, installations, airfields and rail lines, with weather reconnaissance as a secondary task.

After the war, the wing remained in the Pacific theater, moving from Korea to Itami Air Base, Japan in December 1954, continuing to provide reconnaissance as needed. Wing elements were dispersed to various bases in Japan. The 45th Squadron remained in Korea until March 1955, when it moved to Misawa Air Base on Hokkaido, while the 12th Squadron moved to Yokota Air Base in August 1956, and the 15th Squadron was at Komaki Air Base and, later, at Kadena Air Base. Only the 11th Squadron was stationed with the wing headquarters.

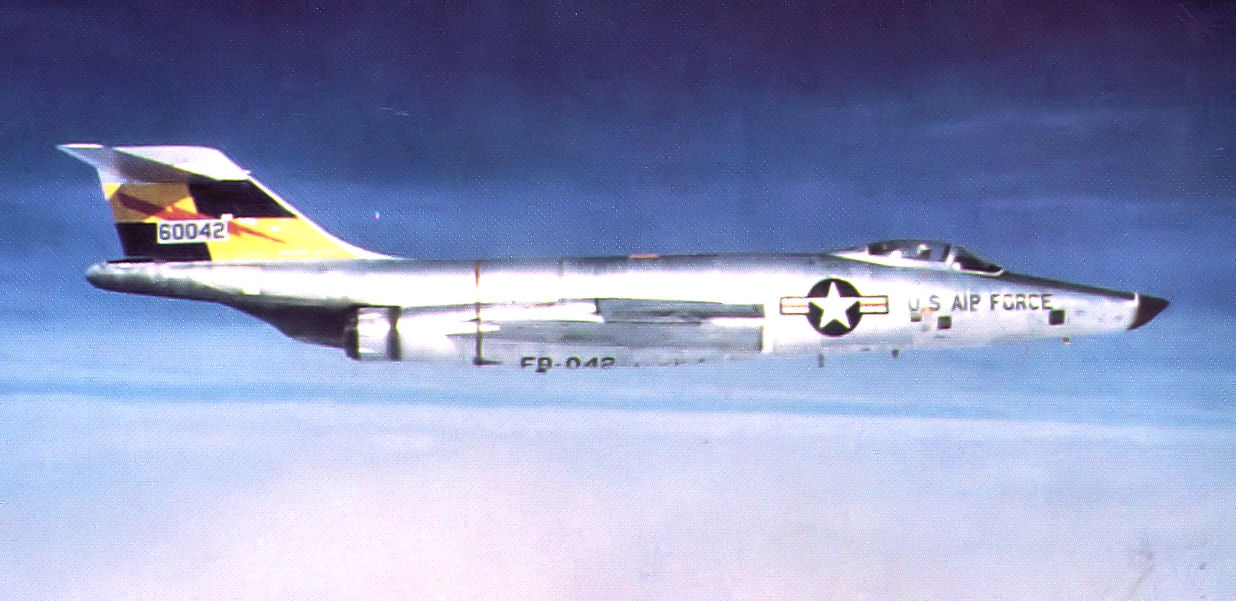
15th Squadron RF-101 (Note: Aircraft is McDonnell RF-101C-60-MC Voodoo serial 56-42.)

On 1 July 1957, the 67th moved to Yokota Air Base, Japan as US operations at Itami came to a close. At Yokota, it absorbed the resources of the 6007th Reconnaissance Group, which was discontinued in August, becoming the sole reconnaissance wing in the Far East. In September, the wing converted to the Dual Deputate organization, (Note: Under this plan flying [and missile] squadrons reported to the wing Deputy Commander for Operations and maintenance squadrons reported to the wing Deputy Commander for Maintenance.) and all flying squadrons were directly assigned to the wing when its 67th Tactical Reconnaissance Group was inactivated. The 67th Group had moved to Yokota in 1956 and became nonoperational upon the wing's move to Yokota and its squadrons were attached to the wing before being assigned. The 67th Tactical Reconnaissance Wing was deployed to Taoyuan Air Base, Taiwan from 13 to 23 July 1959, and aircraft were deployed to Kung Kuan Air Base, Taiwan from 10 – 20 May 1960. It also added air refueling and airlift to its mission in September, with these new tasks continuing until the wing inactivated in Dec 1960.

=== Reconnaissance in the United States ===
After activation at Mountain Home Air Force Base, Idaho in 1966, the wing began training in the United States for aerial, visual, optical, electronic, thermal, and radar reconnaissance. In May, the wing added training of replacement McDonnell RF-4C Phantom II reconnaissance aircrews to its mission, and between June 1968 and November 1970, it also trained tactical fighter crews with the F-4D. Preparing to turn Mountain Home Air Force Base over to the 347th Tactical Fighter Wing, the 67th served as headquarters for both organizations for its final two months at Mountain Home.

The wing moved to Texas in 1971, replacing the 75th Tactical Reconnaissance Wing at and absorbing its personnel and equipment. At Bergstrom, it concentrated on maintaining tactical reconnaissance mission forces capable of meeting worldwide operational requirements. It conducted reconnaissance training of Air Force, United States Marine Corps, and allied reconnaissance aircrews between 1982 and 1989.

The wing acted as an advisor to Air National Guard reconnaissance units until 1992. It performed reconnaissance missions supporting the US Customs Service from 1983 until 1992. The wing hosted the Tactical Air Command sponsored worldwide tactical reconnaissance competition at its home base in 1986, 1988 and 1990.

=== Desert Storm and inactivation ===
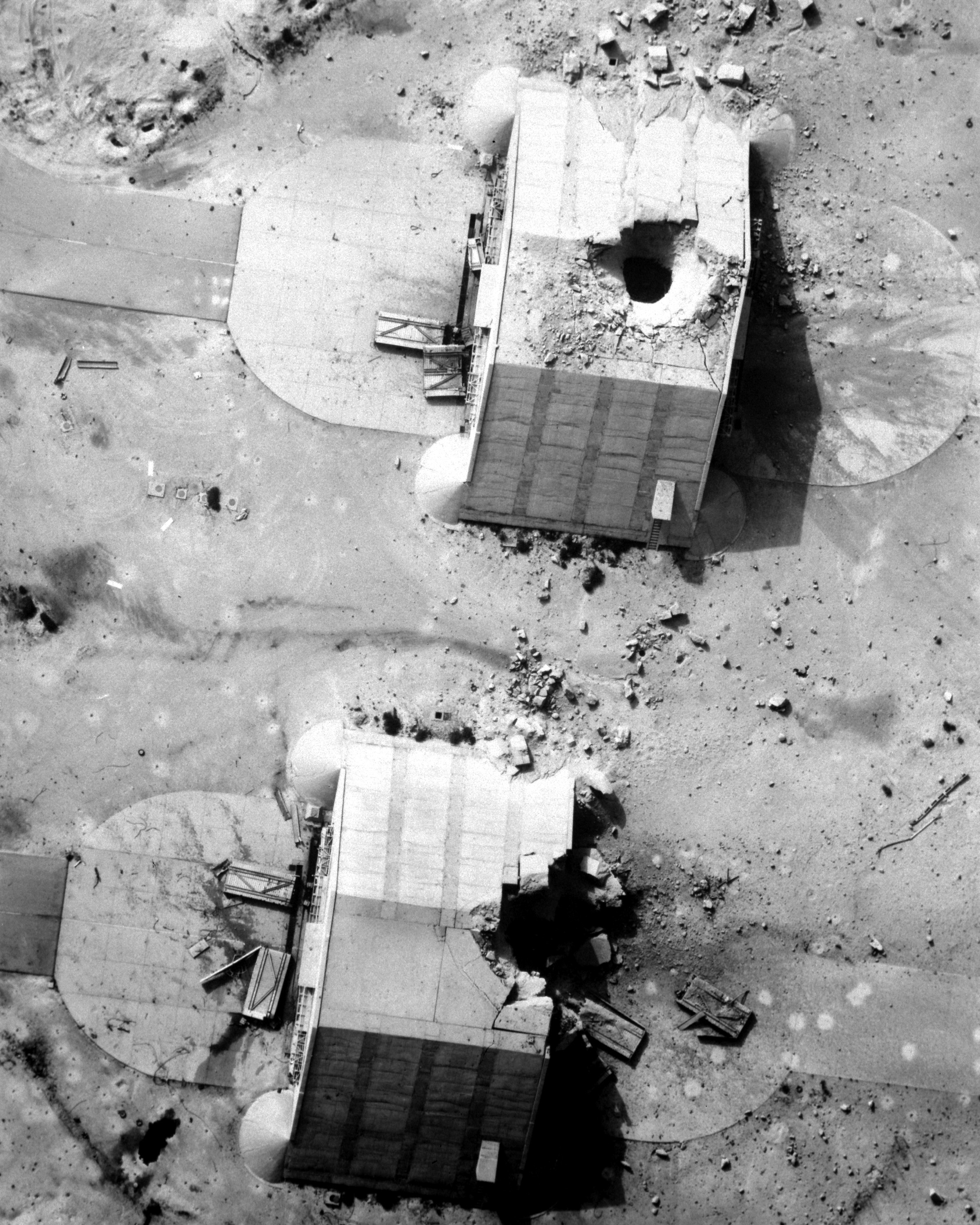
Bomb damage assessment photography from Operation Desert Storm

The wing deployed personnel and equipment in support of Desert Storm in 1991, photographing enemy targets, conducting searches for enemy missile sites, tracking movement of the Iraqi Republican Guard and oil slicks, and conducting overall battle damage assessment. The wing ended flying operations in August 1992, but remained active until Bergstrom Air Force Base closed the following year.

Between 1993 and 2000, the wing's mission included directing planning of all-source intelligence, electronic combat, and security support for the Air Intelligence Agency. Since 2000, it has collected and analyzed intelligence and provided it to decision makers and the test and acquisition community. The wing also attacked adversary information and information systems while defending its own.

In September 2020, the wing stood up the 867th Cyberspace Operations Group at Joint Base San Antonio.

== Lineage ==
- Established as the 67th Reconnaissance Wing on 6 November 1947

Organized on 25 November 1947
Redesignated 67th Tactical Reconnaissance Wing on 22 August 1948 (Note: The experimental (table of distribution Reconnaissance Wing) was discontinued on 24 August 1948. The permanent (table of organization Tactical Reconnaissance Wing) had been established and activated two days earlier. The Air Force later consolidated the two wings and considers this to have been a redesignation. Ravenstein, pp. 105–07.)
Inactivated on 28 March 1949

- Activated on 25 February 1951

Discontinued and inactivated on 8 December 1960

- Activated on 2 August 1965 (not organized)

Organized on 1 January 1966
Redesignated 67th Reconnaissance Wing on 1 October 1991
Inactivated on 30 September 1993

- Redesignated 67th Intelligence Wing and activated on 1 October 1993

Redesignated 67th Information Operations Wing on 1 August 2000
Redesignated 67th Network Warfare Wing 5 July 2006
Redesignated 67th Cyberspace Wing c. 15 September 2013

=== Assignments ===
- Twelfth Air Force, 25 November 1947 (attached to 1st Fighter Wing)
- Fourth Air Force, 20 December 1948 – 28 March 1949 (attached to 1st Fighter Wing)
- Fifth Air Force, 25 February 1951
- 41st Air Division, 10 November 1958 – 8 December 1960
- Tactical Air Command, 2 August 1965 (not organized)
- Twelfth Air Force, 1 January 1966

- 831st Air Division, 15 April 1966
- Twelfth Air Force, 20 April 1971 – 30 September 1993
- Air Intelligence Agency, 1 October 1993
- Eighth Air Force, 1 February 2001
- Twenty-Fourth Air Force, 18 August 2009
- Sixteenth Air Force, 11 October 2019 – present

=== Components ===
Groups

- 26th Technical Group (later 26th Intelligence Group, 26th Information Operations Group, 26th Network Operations Group, 26th Cyberspace Operations Group): 1 October 1993 – present
- 67th Reconnaissance Group (later 67th Tactical Reconnaissance Group, 67th Intelligence Group, 67th Information Operations Group, 67th Network Operations Group, 67th Cyberspace Operations Group): 25 November 1947 – 28 March 1949, 25 February 1951 – 1 October 1957 (attached to 6102 Air Base Wing after 1 July 1957), 1 October 1993 – present
- 690th Information Operations Group (later 690th Network Support Group, 690th Cyberspace Operations Group): 5 November 2001 – 4 June 2018
- 692d Intelligence Group (later 692d Information Operations Group, 692d Intelligence Group): 1 October 1993 – 1 October 2004
- 694th Intelligence Group: 1 October 1993 – 1 January 1998
- 6960th Electronic Security Group: 1 October 1993 – c. 1994
- 867th Cyberspace Operations Group: 18 September 2020 – present

Squadrons

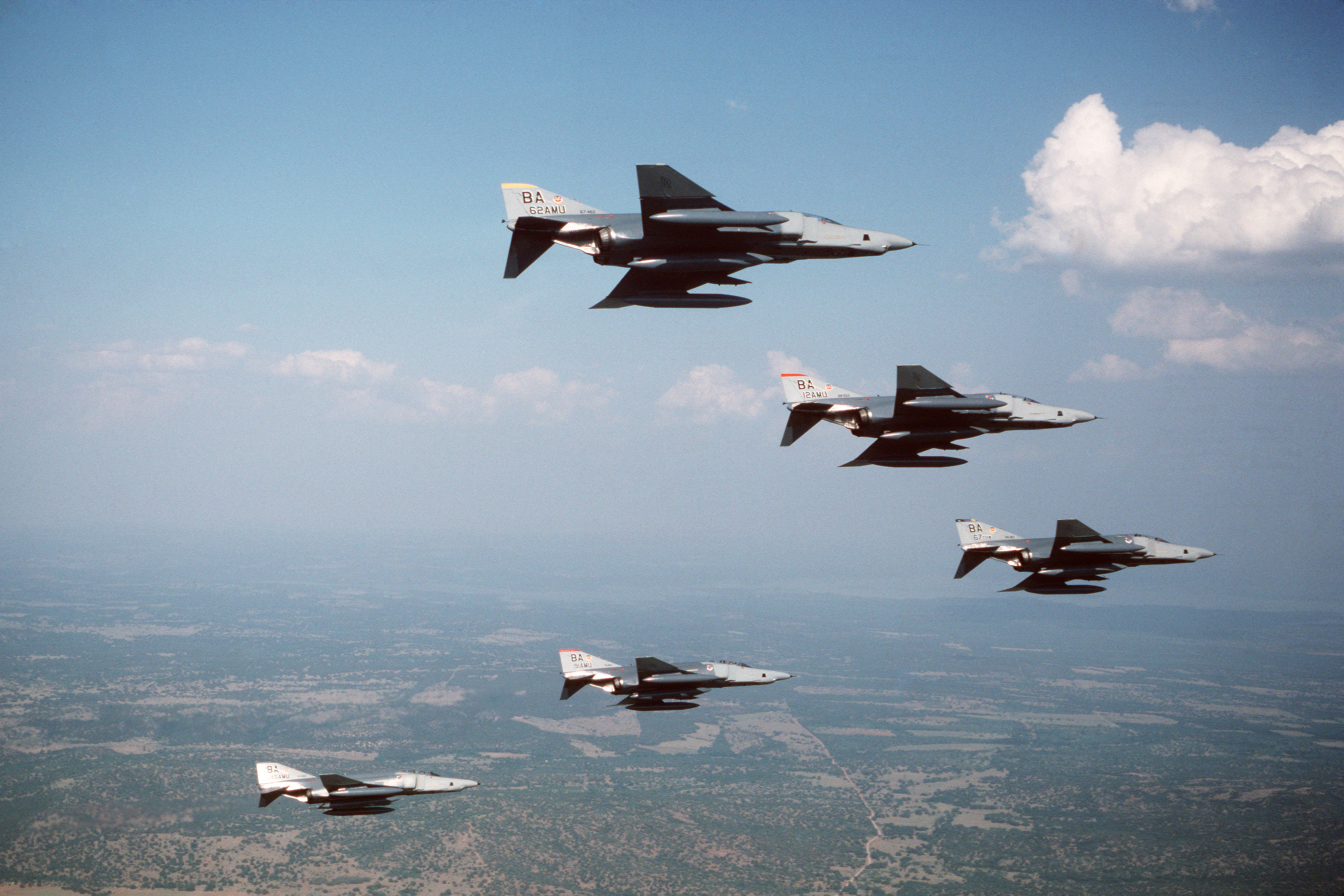
Wing RF-4Cs at Bergstrom AFB (Note: The aircraft represent four different squadrons: 62nd Tactical Reconnaissance Training Squadron (yellow tail); 12th Tactical Reconnaissance Squadron (orange tail); 91st Tactical Reconnaissance Squadron (red tail) and 45th Tactical Reconnaissance Training Squadron (black check tail). The lead aircraft is the wing commanders aircraft, whose fin flash represents all four squadrons. Taken 11 May 1988.)

- 4th Tactical Reconnaissance Squadron: 15 July – 15 October 1971
- 7th Tactical Reconnaissance Squadron: 15 December 1967 – 15 October 1971
- 9th Tactical Reconnaissance Squadron: 15 July – 31 August 1971
- 10th Tactical Reconnaissance Squadron: 1 January 1966 – 30 June 1971
- 11th Tactical Reconnaissance Squadron: attached 1 June – 24 November 1954; attached 1 July – 30 September 1957, assigned 1 October 1957 – 8 March 1960; assigned 1 April-25 October 1966
- 12th Tactical Reconnaissance Squadron: attached 1 June – 24 November 1954; attached 1 July – 30 September 1957, assigned 1 October 1957 – 8 March 1960; assigned 1 July-2 September 1966; assigned 31 August 1971 – 30 September 1992 (detached 5 May – 4 June 1974, 8 – 29September 1977, 7 July – 7 August 1981, 15 May – 11 June 1984, 27 August – 24 September 1987)
- 15th Tactical Reconnaissance Squadron: attached 1 June – 24 November 1954; attached 1 July – 30 September 1957, assigned 1 October 1957 – 25 April 1960
- 22d Tactical Reconnaissance Squadron: 20 September 1966 – 15 October 1971 (detached 8 – 26 October 1968, 15 July – 15 October 1971)
- 45th Tactical Reconnaissance Squadron (later 45th Tactical Reconnaissance Training Squadron): attached 1 June – 24 November 1954; attached 1 July – 30 September 1957, assigned 1 October 1957 – 25 April 1960; assigned 15 October 1971 – 31 October 1975 (detached 13 June – 7 July 1973); assigned 1 April 1982 – 30 September 1989
- 62d Tactical Reconnaissance Training Squadron: 1 July 1982 – 31 December 1989
- 67th Reconnaissance Technical Squadron: 1 March 1951 – 8 December 1960, 15 July 1971 – 1 September 1977
- 91st Tactical Reconnaissance Squadron: 15 July 1971 – 30 August 1991 (detached 26 April – 25 May 1972, 25 May – 9 June 1977, 1 May – 2 June 1980, 2 May – 1 June 1983, 24 April – 23 May 1985)
- 417th Tactical Fighter Squadron: 1 July 1968 – 15 November 1970 (detached 12 January – 4 April 1969 and 11 September – 10 October 1970)
- 421st Air Refueling Squadron: attached 17 – 30 September 1957, assigned 1 October 1957 – 8 December 1960 (detached 21 November – 8 December 1960)
- 548th Reconnaissance Technical Squadron: attached 1 July – 8 December 1957, assigned 8 December 1957 – 8 December 1960
- 801st Reconnaissance Technical Squadron: 1 January 1966 – 15 July 1971
- 4467th Tactical Reconnaissance Intelligence Support Squadron (later 4467th Reconnaissance Intelligence Support Squadron): 30 November 1990 – 30 September 1992
- 6021st Reconnaissance Squadron: attached 1 July – 8 December 1957
- 6091st Reconnaissance Squadron: attached 1 July – 30 September 1957, assigned 1 October 1957 – 8 December 1960 (detached 21 November – 8 December 1960)

Flight

- 6166th Air Weather Reconnaissance Flight, attached 25 February 1951 – 25 November 1953

=== Stations ===
- March Field (later March Air Force Base), California, 25 November 1947 – 28 March 1949
- Komaki Air Base, Japan, 25 February 1951
- Taegu Air Base (K-2), South Korea, 21 March 1951
- Kimpo Air Base (K-14), South Korea, 20 August 1951
- Itami Air Base, Japan, 6 December 1954

- Yokota Air Base, Japan, 1 July 1957 – 8 December 1960
- Mountain Home Air Force Base, Idaho, 1 January 1966 – 15 July 1971
- Bergstrom Air Force Base, Texas, 15 July 1971 – 30 September 1993
- Kelly Air Force Base (later Kelly Field Annex, Lackland Air Force Base), Texas, 1 October 1993 – present

=== Aircraft ===
- Douglas B-26 Invader, 1947–1949; 1951–1957
- Douglas RB-26 Invader, 1947–1949; 1951–1957
- Douglas FA-26C Invader, 1947–1949
- Douglas WB-26 Invader, 1951–1957
- North American F-6 Mustang (later RF-51), 1947, 1951–1953
- Lockheed FP-80 Shooting Star (later RF-80), 1947–1949, 1951–1955
- Lockheed F-80 Shooting Star, 1952–1953
- North American RF-86 Sabre, 1951–1956
- North American F-86F Sabre, 1953
- Republic RF-84F Thunderflash, 1955–1958
- Republic F-84F Thunderstreak, 1955
- Douglas RB-66 Destroyer, 1956–1960
- Douglas WB-66 Destroyer, 1958–1960
- Douglas SC-47 Skytrain, 1957–1960
- Douglas C-54 Skymaster, 1957–1958
- Fairchild C-119 Flying Boxcar, 1957–1958
- Boeing KB-50 Superfortress, 1957–1960
- Boeing RB-50 Superfortress, 1957–1960
- Martin RB-57 Canberra, 1957–1960
- McDonnell RF-101C Voodoo, 1958–1960
- McDonnell RF-4C Phantom II, 1966–1992
- McDonnell F-4E Phantom II, 1968–1969, 1969–1970

== List of commanders ==
No.	Commander		Term		
No.	Portrait	Name	Took office	Left office	Term length
1	William J. Poirier	Colonel; William J. Poirier	July 10, 2012	June 20, 2014	1 year, 345 days
2	David W. Snoddy	Colonel; David W. Snoddy	June 20, 2014	June 28, 2016	2 years, 8 days
3	Bradley L. Pyburn	Colonel; Bradley L. Pyburn	June 28, 2016	June 20, 2018	1 year, 357 days
4	Melissa S. Cunningham	Colonel; Melissa S. Cunningham	June 20, 2018	July 2, 2020	~2 years, 12 days
5	Jeffrey A. Phillips	Colonel; Jeffrey A. Phillips	July 2, 2020	May 25, 2022	~1 year, 327 days
6	Sean C.G. Kern	Colonel; Sean C.G. Kern	May 25, 2022	June 13, 2024	~2 years, 19 days
6	John W. Picklesimer	Colonel; John W. Picklesimer	June 13, 2024	Incumbent	~2 years, 136 days
