= 6007th Reconnaissance Group =

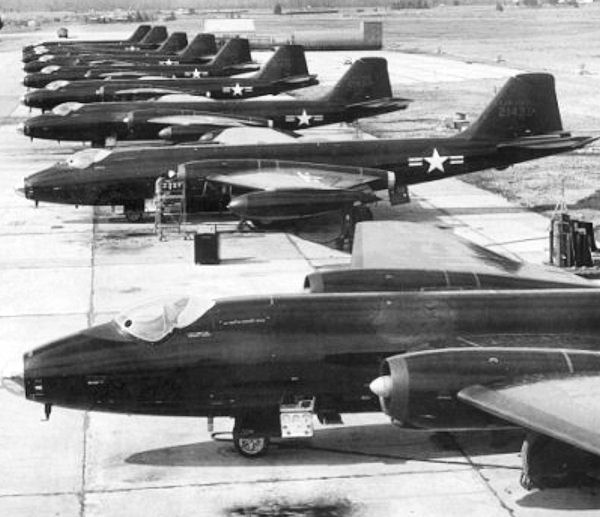
- RB-57A-1 Heartthrob reconnaissance aircraft
- Active: 1950-1957
- Country: United States
- Branch: United States Air Force
- Role: reconnaissance

Insignia
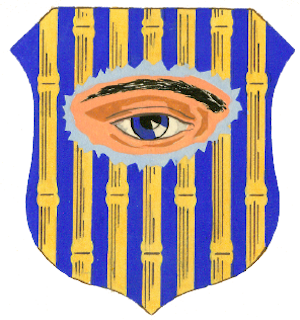
- 6007th Reconnaissance Group emblem

The 6007th Reconnaissance Group is an inactive United States Air Force unit. Its last was assigned to the 6007th Reconnaissance Wing, stationed at Yokota Air Base, Japan. It was discontinued on 9 August 1957.

== History ==
Performed highly classified missions over the Soviet Union and Communist China and reconnaissance monitoring of the Korean De-militarized Zone (DMZ) during the early years of the Cold War. In 1955, the unit was equipped with Martin RB-57A-1 Canberra aircraft. The RB-57A-1s were RB-57A modified under Project Lightweight (later Project Heartthrob) with more powerful J65 engines, crew reduced from two to one, and all items not essential for the daytime photographic mission removed.

Inactivated in 1957, mission taken over by the 67th Tactical Reconnaissance Wing

Much of this unit's history remains classified as of 2012.

== Lineage ==
- Designated as the 6007th Composite Reconnaissance Group, and organized on 11 August 1954

Redesignated 6007th Reconnaissance Group (Composite) on 1 September 1954
Discontinued on 9 August 1957

=== Assignments ===
- Far East Air Forces, 11 Aug 1954
- Fifth Air Force, 15 Oct 1954
- 41st Air Division, 1 Mar 1955 – 9 Aug 1957.

=== Components ===
- 6021st Photographic Mapping Flight (Tactical Reconnaissance), 1 December 1953 (Attached from Fifth Air Force)

Redesignated: 6021st Reconnaissance Squadron, 1 March 1955 – 9 August 1957
Attached to 67th Tactical Reconnaissance Wing: 1 July-9 August 1957

- 6023d Radar Evaluation Flight, 18 March 1954 – 3 July 1956 (Attached from Fifth Air Force)
- 6091st Reconnaissance Flight, 1 December 1953 (Attached from Fifth Air Force)

Redesignated: 6091st Reconnaissance Squadron, 20 December 1954 – 9 August 1957
Attached to 67th Tactical Reconnaissance Wing: 1 July-9 August 1957

- 548th Reconnaissance Technical Squadron, 1 July 1955 – 9 August 1957 (attached to 67th Tactical Reconnaissance Wing after 1 July 1957)

=== Stations ===
- Yokota AB, Japan, 11 August 1954 – 9 August 1957

=== 6091st Reconnaissance Squadron ===
- RB-29 Superfortress (Photo-Recon), 1954
- RB-50B Superfortress (Photo/Weather Recon), 1954-1961
- RB-50E Superfortress (Photo-Recon), 1954-1961
- RB-50G Superfortress (ELINT/Radar Recon), 1954-1961
- RB-45C Tornado, 1954
- RB-57F Canberra, 1963-1968
- C-47 Skytrain, 1954-1968
- C-119G Flying Boxcar, 1954-1968
- C-130A-II Hercules, 1961-1968
- EC-97G Stratofreighter, 19631968

=== 6021st Reconnaissance Squadron ===
- RF-86F Sabre (Haymaker), 1953-1956
- RF-80C Shooting Star, 1954-1955
- RT-33A Shooting Star, 1954-1957
- RB-57A-1 Canberra (Heartthrob), 1955-1957
- RF-84F Thunderstreak, 1956-1957
- RF-100A Super Sabre (Slick Chick), 1957-1957

=== 6023d Radar Evaluation Flight ===
- ECM TB-29 Superfortress (Electronic Countermeasures), 1954-1956
