= 7499th Support Group =

7499th Support Group 7575th Operations Group
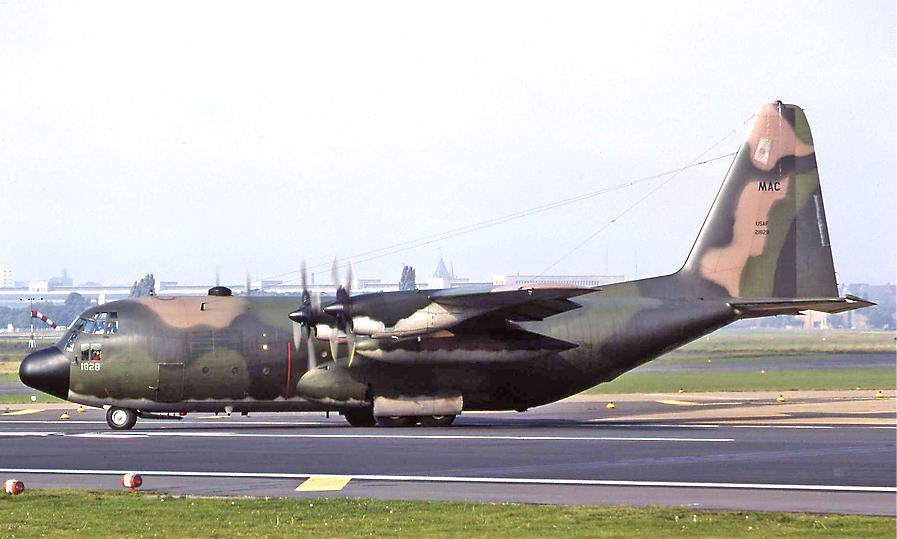
- 7405th Operations Squadron C-130E 62-1828 taxiing at Rhein-Main Air Base, West Germany, 1980
- Active: 1948–1974; 1977–1991
- Country: United States
- Branch: United States Air Force
- Role: Reconnaissance
- Part of: United States Air Forces in Europe

Insignia
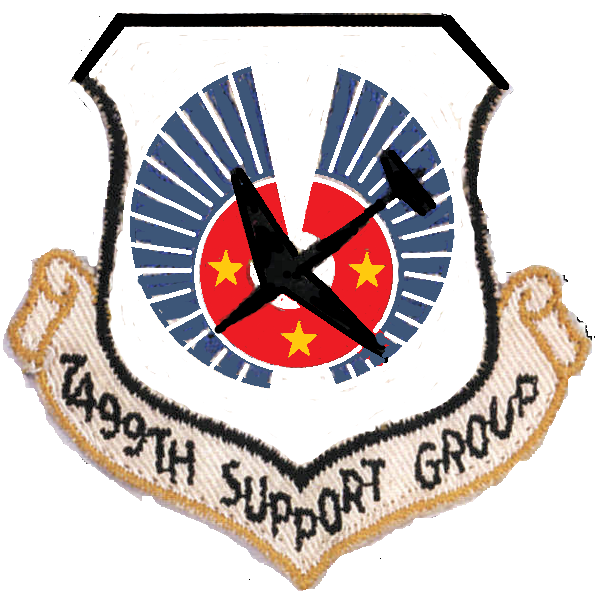
- 7499th Support Group emblem

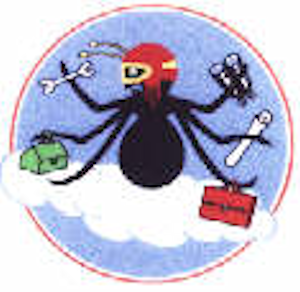
- 7499th Support Squadron emblem

The 7499th Support Group is an inactive United States Air Force (USAFE) organization. Its last assignment was to United States Air Forces in Europe, being stationed at Wiesbaden Air Base, West Germany It was inactivated on 30 June 1974.

The 7499th participated in overt and covert reconnaissance throughout the European theater during the Cold War and reported directly to Headquarters USAFE. The unit was initially formed as a squadron in 1948, first at Furstenfeldbruck Air Base, Germany. By 1955, with the pending inactivation of the Air Resupply And Communications Service's 582d Air Resupply Group at RAF Molesworth, England, the unit was expanded to a group level and moved to Wiesbaden Air Base.

This mission was later performed by the 7575th Operations Group, which operated from Rhein-Main Air Base, West Germany from 1 July 1977 until its inactivation on 31 March 1991.

== History ==
=== Origins ===
The unit's origins can be traced to 9 August 1946, when an Army Air Forces Douglas C-47 Skytrain departed Tulln Air Base near Vienna, Austria, on a scheduled courier run that would take it to Venice, Italy, then south to Rome. These flights were routine, and this aircraft had three passengers besides the crew and cargo. As the C-47 flew toward Venice, it encountered heavy weather, including an undercast, and, unknown to its crew, blundered into Yugoslav airspace for several minutes. Before long Yugoslav Yakovlev Yak-3 fighters shot the C-47 down. The pilot crash-landed and all the people aboard survived but were interned. This caused an immediate uproar from the US government, and stern statements were issued to Yugoslav prime minister Josip Broz (Tito) about immediate release and access to the crash site. Talks were underway when, on 19 August, incredibly, almost the same exact event occurred again. Another C-47 courier aircraft was shot down by Yugoslav fighters in the same area. This time the crew was not so fortunate and all aboard perished.

Under threat of US cutoff of aid to Yugoslavia, Tito yielded, the interned Americans were released, and some compensation paid to the next-of-kin of the dead personnel. Relative calm ensued between the US and Yugoslavia, but a question lingered in the minds of officials in USAFE Headquarters at Wiesbaden, Germany. How did those Yugoslav fighters, twice, find those C-47s in bad weather and shoot them down?

USAFE acquired a Boeing RB-17 Flying Fortress from a photo-mapping unit, Detachment A of the 10th Reconnaissance Group at Furth Air Base, Germany. These aircraft were in Europe as part of Project Casey Jones, an attempt to photomap as much of the world as possible to create maps and charts for use in future contingencies, and installed electronic countermeasures equipment in it. The B-17 was flown carefully along the border near where the C-47s had been shot down, making sure it did not infringe Yugoslav airspace. By luck, on the very first mission, the Yugoslavs cooperated and turned on their radar and began tracking it. The equipment picked up the familiar signals from a German Würzburg radar on about 560 MHz and took bearings, dozens of them, all of which cut at the same point. Where the bearings crossed there had been a German radar school during the war. Obviously the Yugoslavs had put into service one or more of the old German radars.

This mission was so successful that USAFE directed that further electronic "ferret" missions be flown along the border with the Soviet zones of Germany and Austria, as well as over the Baltic Sea, looking for Soviet radar stations. Over the next several years these aircraft detected a gradual Soviet radar buildup in their zones. During the Berlin Airlift 1948–49, the B-17s would fly occasional missions in the Berlin Air Corridors, using call signs making them appear as airlift Douglas C-54 Skymasters ("Big Willie"). They flew only at night and did not land at Tempelhof Central Airport, declaring emergencies with "landing gear problems" and thus exiting to the west without Soviet observers seeing them.

Thus began the electronic intelligence (ELINT) mission. Detachment A would go on to join a flight of the 45th Reconnaissance Squadron (specializing in photographic reconnaissance) on 26 March 1947 and move to Furstenfeldbruck Air Base, Germany. Then came the Berlin Airlift, in June 1948. As part of the collection operation some C-47s and Douglas RB-26 Invaders were acquired and modified with cameras. They occasionally flew as part of the airlift stream, diligently collecting photography. A few B-17 ELINT flights were also made in the Berlin Air Corridors, but only at night.

=== 7499th Support Squadron ===
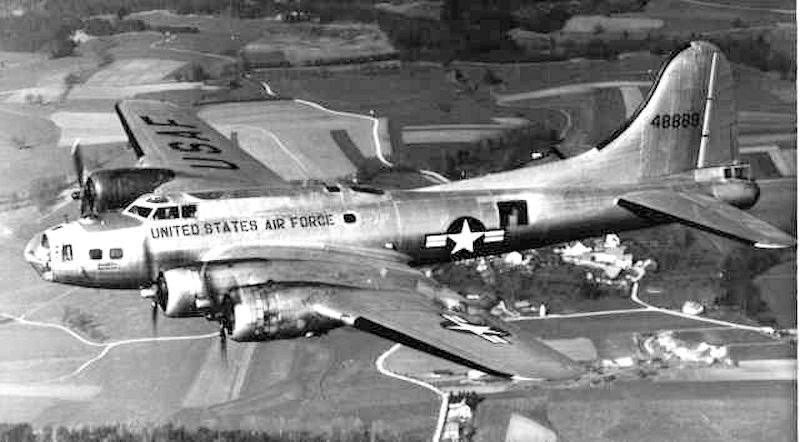
7499th Support Squadron B-17G-85-VE Fortress 44-8889

Most likely because of the airlift and its accompanying sharp increase in tensions, USAFE decided to form the reconnaissance and ELINT units into a single squadron. United States Air Forces in Europe (USAFE) organized the 7499th Air Force Squadron Furstenfeldbruck on 14 October 1948.

From Furstenfeldbruck, the 7499th continued to fly frequent missions in the Berlin Air Corridors. As the Soviets modernized their units and increased their presence, it was vital to gain as much information on them as possible. For better management of this covert outfit as well as to bring it closer to the major USAFE photo and ELINT interpretation centers, the 7499th moved in August 1950 to Wiesbaden Air Base, within a few miles of USAFE Headquarters.

Beginning in 1950, the unit upgraded to C-54 Skymasters to do both photographic reconnaissance and ELINT work, replacing the B-17s. The C-54 boasted better collection capability, and had the additional advantage of actually being a transport, thus attracting much less attention. C-47s also replaced the RB-26s, the C-47s also being less visible to the Soviets than the Invader bomber overflying East Germany.

=== 7499th Support Group ===
In 1955, in response to increasing collection requirements and the pending inactivation of the Military Air Transport Service intelligence units, USAFE upgraded its reconnaissance effort, eexpanding the squadron as the 7499th Support Group at Wiesbaden with three squadrons.

==== 7405th Support Squadron ====
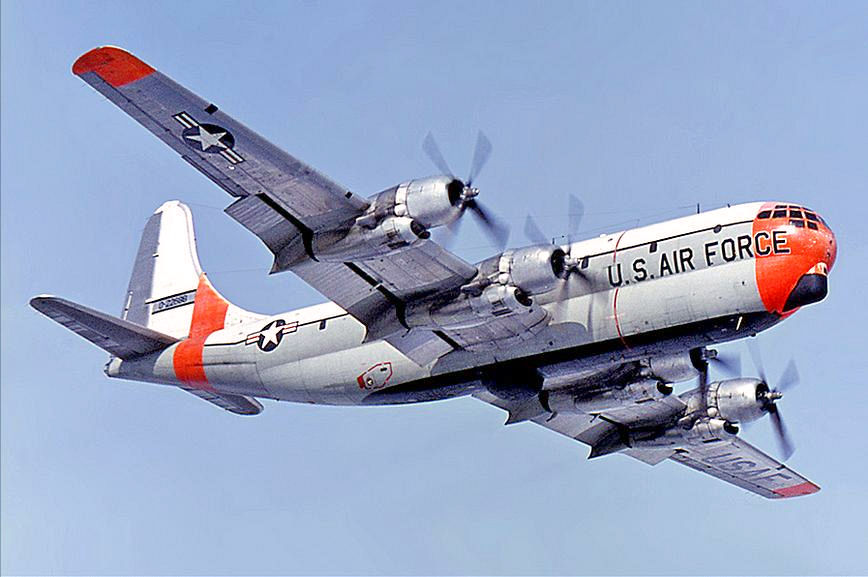
EC-97G Stratofreighter 52-2688

The 7405th Support Squadron became the flying element of the upgraded group, remaining at Wiesbaden as the only unit to conduct corridor collection. The 7405th was openly tasked with the courier mission to West Berlin, meaning it was to conduct daily flights to and from Tempelhof Central Airport carrying passengers and priority cargo. It was known as the "Berlin for Lunch Bunch". Under this cover the newer aircraft were to continue their collection using better sensors, including the first infrared imagery sensors. Its C-47s and RB-26s soldiered on into the late 1950s, and some C-54s until 1963. In 1959 the C-47s were supplanted by four Convair T-29s, navigation trainers converted for courier work and vertical photography, but another generation was about to arrive.

A new aircraft, a specially modified Boeing Boeing EC-97G Stratofreighter, made its appearance in 1953. This aircraft (serial 49-2952), covertly carrying a 240-inch focal length camera, was codenamed Pie Face and was mostly used along the periphery of the satellite nations. This camera, with a 20-foot focal length, was developed by Boston University and was installed initially in a Convair RB-36 Peacemaker. However, it was later decided that because an overflight though the Berlin Air Corridors to Tempelhof by an RB-36 would probably be too provocative, it would be better if a transport aircraft was equipped with this huge camera. The work to remove the camera from the RB-36 and install it in the C-97 was conducted in a secure hangar at Convair at Air Force Plant No. 4, Carswell Air Force Base, Texas. The camera took 18 x 36-inch negatives exposed at 0.0025 seconds and could be positioned to take vertical or left or right oblique photographs through a large window which was hidden by covert doors.

When flown on an occasional Berlin Air Corridor mission, even at the required altitudes of less than 10,000 ft, the camera would produce spectacular, high-resolution photography, very useful for technical analysis of equipment. This aircraft would provide valuable imagery right up until 1972, when it was finally retired to AMARC after some productive missions around Cuba during the Cuban Missile Crisis.

Additional Boeing EC-97Gs that arrived in 1963 were ostensibly cargo carriers, but fitted with ELINT gear and, in one case, with oblique cameras. Aircraft 52-2686 and 52-2639 were equipped with multiple ELINT work stations in the upper, cargo section of the fuselage. Aircraft 52-2688 was equipped with cameras only. Aircraft 52-2687 was equipped with smaller, single work stations, one for ELINT and one for cameras on the lower deck of the double fuselage, leaving the upper deck normal in appearance and capable of carrying cargo. These aircraft were designed to gather high-quality technical data on the then-new Soviet SA-2 Guideline Surface-to-air missile system, which by the mid-1960s had spread throughout the Warsaw Pact countries, especially in East Germany, and was downing US aircraft over North Vietnam. This platform was especially valuable for providing data enabling the US to design appropriate electronic countermeasures against the SA-2. The north and south Berlin Air Corridors were unique places for this collection, since several Soviet SA-2 sites were located directly within corridor limits. When the SA-2 was superseded by more advanced missile systems, the aircraft was reconfigured to collect on them.

==== 7406th Support Squadron ====
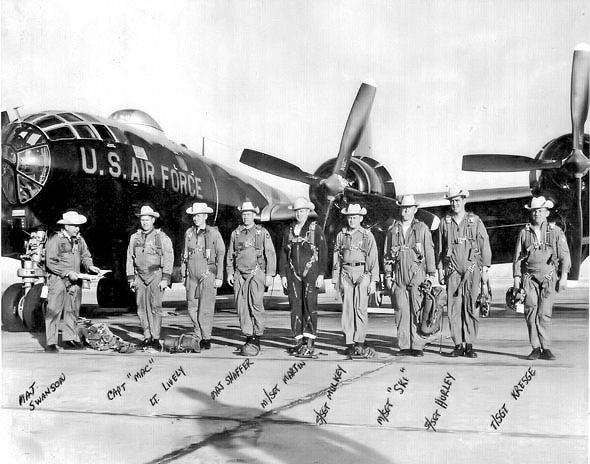
7406th Support Squadron Boeing RB-50B-55-BO Superfortress 47–157 Wiesbaden AB, West Germany, 1956.

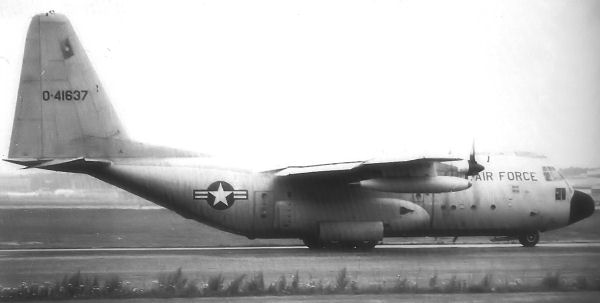
Lockheed C-130A-LM Hercules, AF Serial No. 54-1637 of the 7406th Operations Squadron.

The 7406th Support Squadron was activated at Rhein-Main Air Base, West Germany on 10 May 1955 and received its first aircraft (a Boeing RB-50E Superfortress) in March 1956. The mission of the 7406th was airborne reconnaissance. It owned and maintained the aircraft and provided the flight crews. A separate USAF Security Service (USAFSS) squadron provided the crew that manned the intelligence collection positions on the aircraft.

The RB-50s were replaced with specially configured Lockheed C-130A Hercules reconnaissance aircraft in 1958. The first Hercules, 56-0484 was assigned in March 1958. Other C-130A-II aircraft assigned to the 7406th included in order of assignment from July to October 1958: 56–0525, 56–0528, 56–0530, 56–0534, 56–0538,56–0541, 56–0535 and 56-0540.

Under the Big Safari program of special procurement, E-Systems converted ten C-130A aircraft for signals intelligence (SIGINT) duties under project Sun Valley. These C-130s replaced the RB-50Es which were modified as RB-50Gs and transferred to the Pacific.

One of these C-130s (56-0528)) was shot down with the loss of a crew of seventeen (six 7406th flight crew members and eleven USAFSS intelligence operators) over Soviet Armenia on 2 September 1958, becoming the first C-130 lost to hostile fire. Four Soviet MiG-17 pilots took turns firing on the unarmed C-130 when the American aircraft inadvertently penetrated Soviet airspace while on a recon mission along the Turkish-Armenian border. The C-130 had flown fewer than 200 hours when it was shot down. On 2 Sep 1997, the National Security Agency dedicated at National Vigilance Park, Fort Meade, Maryland an Aerial Reconnaissance Memorial consisting of a refurbished C-130A restored to look identical to C-130A 60-528 when it was shot down. The Aerial Reconnaissance Memorial honors all Silent Warriors (all military airborne recon crews) who paid the ultimate price while defending their country.

7499th crews operated temporarily out of MacDill Air Force Base, Florida in the 1960s. At first (Feb 1964) it was attached to the 15th Tactical Fighter Wing, then in Feb 1966 the 4409th Support Squadron was organized. The mission area was the north coast of Cuba with a coordinated Lockheed U-2 Dragon Lady mission. At first 7406th flight crews, on temporary duty, trained Tactical Air Command 4409th Squadron flight crews until more 7406th Squadron personnel transferred to the 4409th.

Lockheed C-130B-II Hercules aircraft that had previously been assigned at Yokota Air Base, Japan from 1961 to 1971 were sent to the 7406th at Rhein-Main AB in 1971, replacing the C-130A-II models that were converted to original cargo configuration and assigned to Air National Guard units in the United States.

The 7406th continued flying reconnaissance missions from Rhein-Main in the C-130B models until 30 June 1973 when the squadron's sister USAFSS squadron moved to Hellenikon Air Base, Greece as Detachment 1, 7499th Support Group. This was just south of Athens. Uniforms were not permitted off base. 7406th operations remained at Rhein-Main but it flew operational missions out of Hellenikon from 1 July 1973 until its last C-130B-II mission was flown on 13 June 1974. The unit was flying only Mediterranean missions by this time. The 7406th was inactivated on 30 June 1974. After inactivation of the 7406th Squadron the 55th Strategic Reconnaissance Wing at Offutt Air Force Base, Nebraska took over the missions with Boeing RC-135 aircraft.

==== 7407th Support Squadron ====
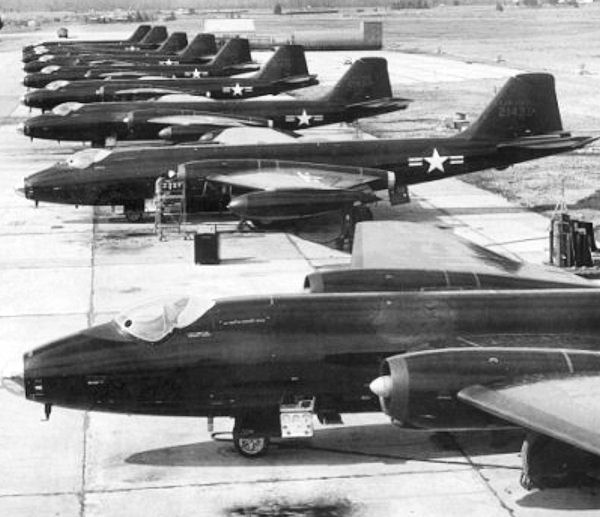
RB-57A-1 reconnaissance aircraft, Wiesbaden AB, 1955

The 7407th Support Squadron performed airborne photo surveillance. They used Martin RB-57A Canberras, then RB-57D, and finally RB-57F Canberra aircraft at Rhein-Main. In late 1955 the squadron received ten highly modified RB-57A-1 Canberra reconnaissance aircraft, These aircraft were modified RB-57As under Project Lightweight (later renamed Project Heartthrob) with higher-thrust Wright J65 engines, a reduction of the crew from two to one, the removal of all items not absolutely essential for the daylight photographic reconnaissance mission. and capable of carrying P-2s, K-17, K-37, K-38, or T-17 cameras in the bomb bay which could be interchanged according to the aircraft's mission. The intended mission of Project Heart Throb aircraft included day and night, high and low, and visual and photographic reconnaissance. The RB-57A was unarmed. It was painted with a high gloss black paint which was intended to minimize detection by searchlights. The crew was two—one pilot and one photo-navigator. The 7407th flew between 16 and 20 sorties before it was closed down. These sorties were flown over Czechoslovakia, Hungary and Yugoslavia between September 1955 and Aug 1956 and were usually fairly shallow penetrations. Many sorties were tracked by Mikoyan-Gurevich MiG-15s or Mikoyan-Gurevich MiG-17s, but these aircraft lacked sufficient performance to pose a significant threat to the high-flying RB-57As. It is possible that one of these planes was shot down by a surface-to-air missile during the Hungarian Revolution of 1956, after which Heartthrob operations ended. Four RB-57s were sent to the 6021st Reconnaissance Squadron at Yokota Air Base, Japan in early November 1956.

Two other B-57s, designated RB-57A-2 were modified with a bulbous nose containing AN/APS-60 mapping radar and a SIGINT direction finder system in 1957 under project SARTAC. It is known that they carried a high-capacity data tape recorder in the bomb bay to store intelligence data obtained during sorties, and they were also equipped with doppler navigation radar. The aircraft and their missions were very secret and little information about them was ever released.

The service of the RB-57As was brief, as in 1957, air refueling capable RB-57D Canberras were deployed in 1957 to the 7407th to support USAFE operations. All RB-57D operations were under heavy security and very little information ever leaked out about their early operations. They presumably carried out reconnaissance missions along the East German border and over the Baltic Sea. Since the missions were carried out under an atmosphere of high secrecy, RB-57s returning from missions over the Baltic were often intercepted by Royal Air Force Hawker Hunters just to make sure that they were not Soviet aircraft.

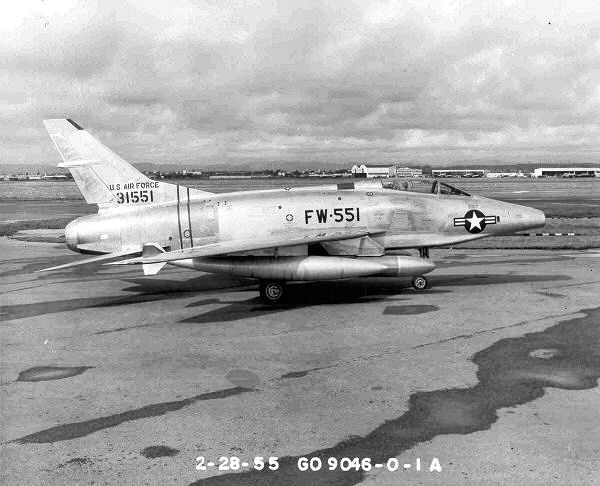
North American RF-100A-10-NA Super Sabre 53-1551 Bitburg AB, West Germany 28 February 1955. used by Detachment 1 of 7407th Support Sqn of 7499th Support Group. Aircraft Crashed near Neidenbach, West Germany on 1 October 1956. Pilot ejected safely.

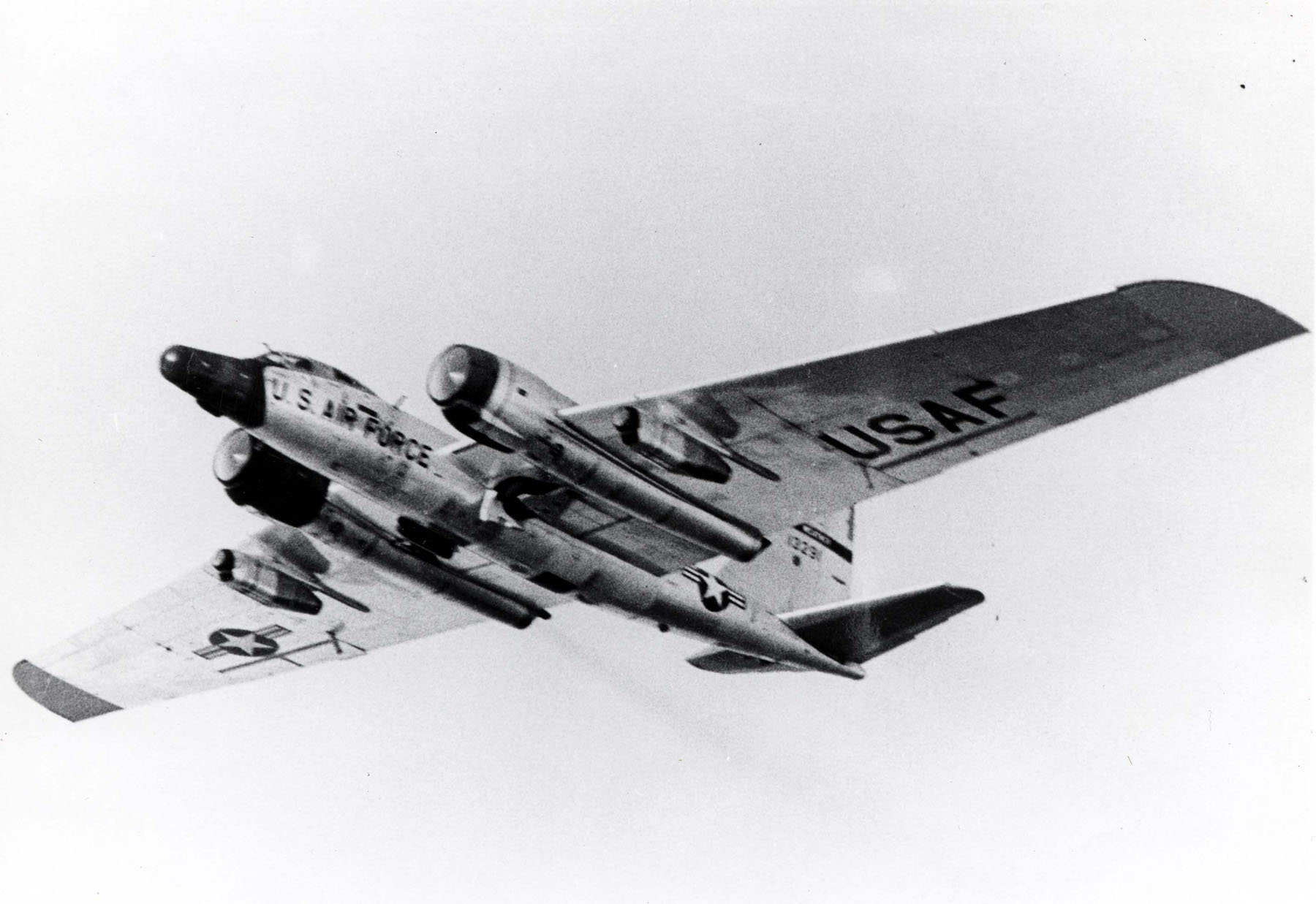
Martin RB-57F-CF 63-13291, 7407th Combat Support Squadron, Rhein-Main AB, West Germany. Aircraft retired to AMARC as BM0106, 30 May 1974.

The 7407th squadron had a Detachment 1 organized at Bitburg Air Base, West Germany using three North American RF-100A Super Sabre reconnaissance aircraft (53-1551, 53–1554, 53–1554) called as "Slick Chicks". In May 1955, after successful competition of flight tests, the aircraft were sent to the 7407th Support Squadron.

The overflight operations these aircraft conducted are still classified, however, one details of one particular flight in 1956 have leaked out. On this sortie the pilot of 53–1551 took off from a base in Turkey to photograph a rocket base deep inside the Soviet Union. The RF-100A was quickly picked up by Soviet radar and, as the target was at the extreme range of the aircraft, the pilot had no option but to fly a virtually straight track. As a consequence the Soviets soon determined the intended target. Throughout the mission, the pilot was faced with the unnerving spectacle of a never-ending stream of Soviet interceptor fighters attempting to bring down the RF-100A by firing a variety of machine-guns, cannons and missiles at the aircraft. To compound the pilot's problems, his heavy fuel load and four drop tanks allowed only very limited evasive maneuvering. Thanks to poor Soviet gunnery, inadequate planning by the Soviet fighter controllers and a fair slice of luck, the pilot reached the target and took the required photographs. However, his problems were far from over, as the target was at the extreme limits of the aircraft's range and no other airfields were available, he had no choice but to reverse course and retrace his route. The pilot made it back to Turkey, but with virtually empty tanks having kept the aircraft in continuous afterburner for over half an hour as he shot past some extremely agitated Russians – as the RF-100A was officially limited to just a few minutes of afterburner, this effectively destroyed the entire aft fuselage.

As far as it can be established, none of the "Slick Chicks" were lost over unfriendly territory. In June 1958 the Detachment was inactivated and the two remaining RF-100A's were transferred to the 3131st Maintenance Group at Châteauroux-Déols Air Base, France and eventually were sent to Taiwan.

Intelligence gathering sorties by the RB-57D's continued until 1964 when wing fatigue problems caused type to be withdrawn from service. In late 1963, the two prototype Martin RB-57F Canberras were assigned to the 7407th for operational testing and evaluation. They carried out a series of high-altitude reconnaissance flights along the East German border and over the Baltic Sea. In February 1964, following these trials, they were transferred to the 58th Weather Reconnaissance Squadron at Kirtland Air Force Base, New Mexico. Eventually two production RB-57Fs capable of covertly mounting the Bulova 707-1000 long range camera with a 240-inch focal length were assigned to the 7407th. Stress cracks began appearing in the wing spars and ribs of the RB-57Fs in the early 1970s and the activities of the RB-57Fs were restricted. The last of the RB-57Fs were retired in early 1974 and 7407th Squadron was inactivated 30 June 1974.

On 14 December 1965, one of the prototype RB-57Fs (63-13287) operating temporarily from Incirlik Air Base, Turkey, was lost during a mission over the Black Sea. What actually happened is still uncertain. There were reports that the aircraft had been shot down by a Soviet S-75 Dvina Surface-to-air missile, but at the time, the official statement by the USAF was that the aircraft crew had probably perished from an oxygen system failure, since it took over an hour for the aircraft to spiral down from altitude and fall into the Black Sea. Although searches for the wreckage continued through 28 December, only small bits and pieces of it were ever found. However, there were also reports that the two crewmembers were captured alive by the Soviets, with their ultimate fate being uncertain.

==== Downsizing of the 7499th ====
All along, the 7405th and its sister squadrons were also flying peripheral reconnaissance missions throughout Europe and, increasingly, the Middle East, but beginning in the late 1960s Strategic Air Command Boeing RC-135s assumed a greater share of the peripheral strategic reconnaissance mission and on 30 June 1974 the 7499th Group and the 7406th and 7407th squadrons were inactivated. However, the 7405th Support Squadron, redesignated the 7405th Operations Squadron, and continued its mission because the Berlin Air Corridor missions were unique and no RC-135s would be flying to West Berlin. Therefore, the 7405th Operations Squadron and its "Berlin for Lunch Bunch" C-130s continued this unique task, with the squadron being directly assigned to Headquarters, USAFE.

=== 7575th Operations Group ===
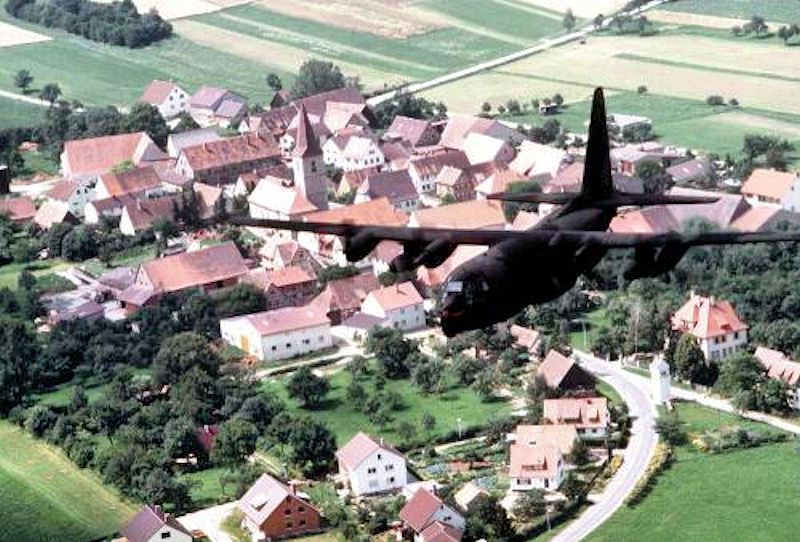
7th Special Operations Squadron MC-130E Combat Talon flying over a German village.

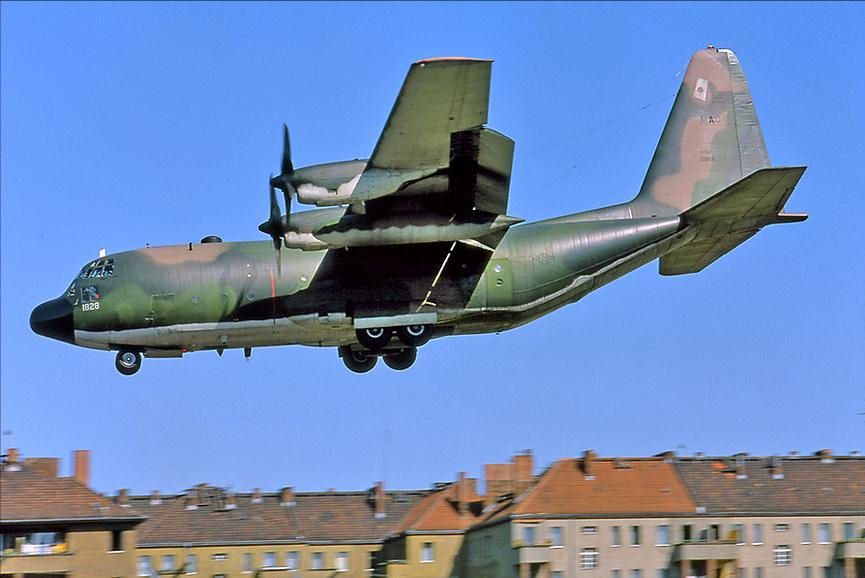
Lockheed C-130E-LM Hercules 62-1828. The Aircraft fitted with various sensors and used by the 7405th Operations Sqdn as spyplane operating from Rhein-Main AB, West Germany. 1828 is shown landing at Tempelhof Central Airport, West Berlin, on 14 April 1981. Note the fake MAC markings (the 7405th was subordinate to USAFE), probably designed to enable these C-130Es to blend in at the 7405th's Rhein-Main base.

In late December 1975, the 7405th flew its last EC-97G mission from Wiesbaden Air Base when the USAF turned the base over to the United States Army and moved its operations to Rhein-Main Air Base. There, it acquired three heavily modified C-130E Hercules, airlifters in name only. By this time, technology improvements were such that each aircraft could carry a variety of sensors with advanced capabilities. Thus, if one sensor type detected a new and unusual activity, the aircrew could almost instantly bring other sensors to bear on it. This ability provided lucrative intelligence time and time again.

On 1 July 1977, the squadron was assigned to the newly organized 7575th Operations Group' at Rhein-Main. Along with the 7575th Group, the 7580th Operations Squadron was activated on 1 July 1977. The 7580th was a non-flying squadron staffed with C-130 electronic warfare officers and aircraft maintenance personnel.

In 1977, when the 7575th Operations Group was formed at, USAFE realigned the 7th Special Operations Squadron under its control, until March 1983, when the 7th transferred from USAFE to Military Airlift Command. The 7th operated four MC-130E Combat Talon Is (64-0523, 64–0555, 64–0561 and 64-0566). Although even today very little is known about this special unit, the mere fact that the USAF information service always answers 'no comment' to any questions about its role is sufficient to allow the tentative conclusion that clandestine operations are involved, with the squadron performing undisclosed missions under the direction of the DCS Operations of HQ USAFE.

The 7th's MC-130Es were spotted in every corner of Europe. These sightings were perhaps connected with NATO marine unit exercises with which thesquadron was also involved. One of the most bizarre sightings dates from January 1976 when a traveler from West Berlin saw a low-flying C-130 over the Transitstrasse, the transit route, near Magdeburg in the German Democratic Republic. Flying at an estimated fifty meters over the motorway, the Hercules disappeared northwards at great speed. It was certainly an MC-130E from the 7th but what it was doing in East Germany is not so certain. Granted it was flying perfectly legally in the Berlin Air Corridor at the time of the sighting, the fact that it was a black MC-130E from the 7th SOS does make one a trifle suspicious.

The 7405th's Berlin Air Corridor/Control Zone collection missions, with their pivot at Tempelhof Central Airport, continued through the 1980s. Then came the 1989 collapse of the Warsaw Pact and the fall of the Berlin Wall; the 1990 German reunification, and the phase-out of Soviet armed forces from Eastern Europe. The 7405th helped monitor this until shortly before Germany was reunified. On 29 September 1990, the last C-130 collection mission was flown; then, on 3 October, the Berlin Air Corridors and Control Zone officially disappeared. From 1946 to 1990 the "Berlin for Lunch Bunch" had flown over 10,000 missions to West Berlin. Now it had flown its last, Germany and the city of Berlin were again unified, and the 7405th Operations Squadron faded into military aviation and intelligence history. Its mission was completed. The 7405th Operations Squadron was inactivated on 1 January 1991; the 7575th Operations Group and 7580th Operations Squadron were inactivated on 31 March 1991.

== Lineage ==
=== 7499th Support Group ===
- Designated as the 7499th Air Force Squadron and organized on 14 October 1948

Redesignated 7499th Air Force Composite Squadron on 16 May 1949
Redesignated 7499th Composite Squadron on 16 December 1949
Redesignated 7499th Support Squadron on 25 October 1954
Redesignated 7499th Support Group on 10 May 1955
Inactivated on 30 June 1974

Assignments

- United States Air Forces in Europe (attached to [[2nd Air Division after 16 May 1949), 1 November 1948
- Twelfth Air Force, January 1951
- United States Air Forces in Europe, August 1951 – 30 June 1974

Stations

- Fürstenfeldbruck Air Base, Germany (later: West Germany), 1 November 1948
- Wiesbaden Air Base]], West Germany, 1 August 1950 – 30 June 1974

Components

- 7405th Support Squadron, 10 May 1955 – 30 June 1974
- 7406th Support Squadron (Rhein-Main Air Base), 10 May 1955 – 30 June 1974
- 7407th Support Squadron (Rhein-Main Air Base), 10 May 1955 – 30 June 1974
- 7580th Operations Squadron Rhein-Main Air Base), 1 July 1977 – 31 March 1991

=== 7575th Operations Group ===
- Designated as the 7575th Operations Group and activated on 1 July 1977

Inactivated on 31 March 1991

Assignments

- United States Air Forces in Europe, 1 July 1977 – 1 January 1991

Stations

- Rhein-Main Air Base, West Germany (later Germany), 1 July 1977 – 1 January 1991

Components

- 7405th Support Squadron, 1 July 1977 – 1 January 1991
- 7580th Operations Squadron, 1 July 1977 – 31 March 1991
- 7th Special Operations Squadron, 1 Jul 1977 – 1 March 1983

=== Aircraft ===
- Boeing RB-17 Flying Fortress, 1947–1950
- Douglas C-47 Skytrain, 1948–1959
- Douglas RB-26 Invader, 1948–1950
- Douglas C-54 Skymaster, 1950–1963
- Boeing EC-97G Stratofreighter, 1953–1974
- Convair T-29, 1959–1974
- Boeing RB-50D Superfortress, 1956–1957
- Boeing RB-50E Superfortress, 1956–1958
- RB-50G Superfortress, 1956–1958
- Lockheed C-130A-II Hercules, 1958–1971
- Lockheed C-130A Hercules, 1958–1975
- Lockheed C-130B-II Hercules, 1971–1975
- Lockheed MC-130, 1977–1983
- Martin RB-57A Canberra, 1955–1957
- Martin RB-57D Canberra, 1957–1964
- Martin RB-57F Canberra, 1963–1964; 1964–1974
- Lockheed C-130E Hercules, 1975–1990
- North American RF-100A Super Sabre, 1955–1958
