= List of United States Air Force network squadrons =

The following is a list of network squadrons of the United States Air Force.

== Cyberspace Operations Squadrons ==
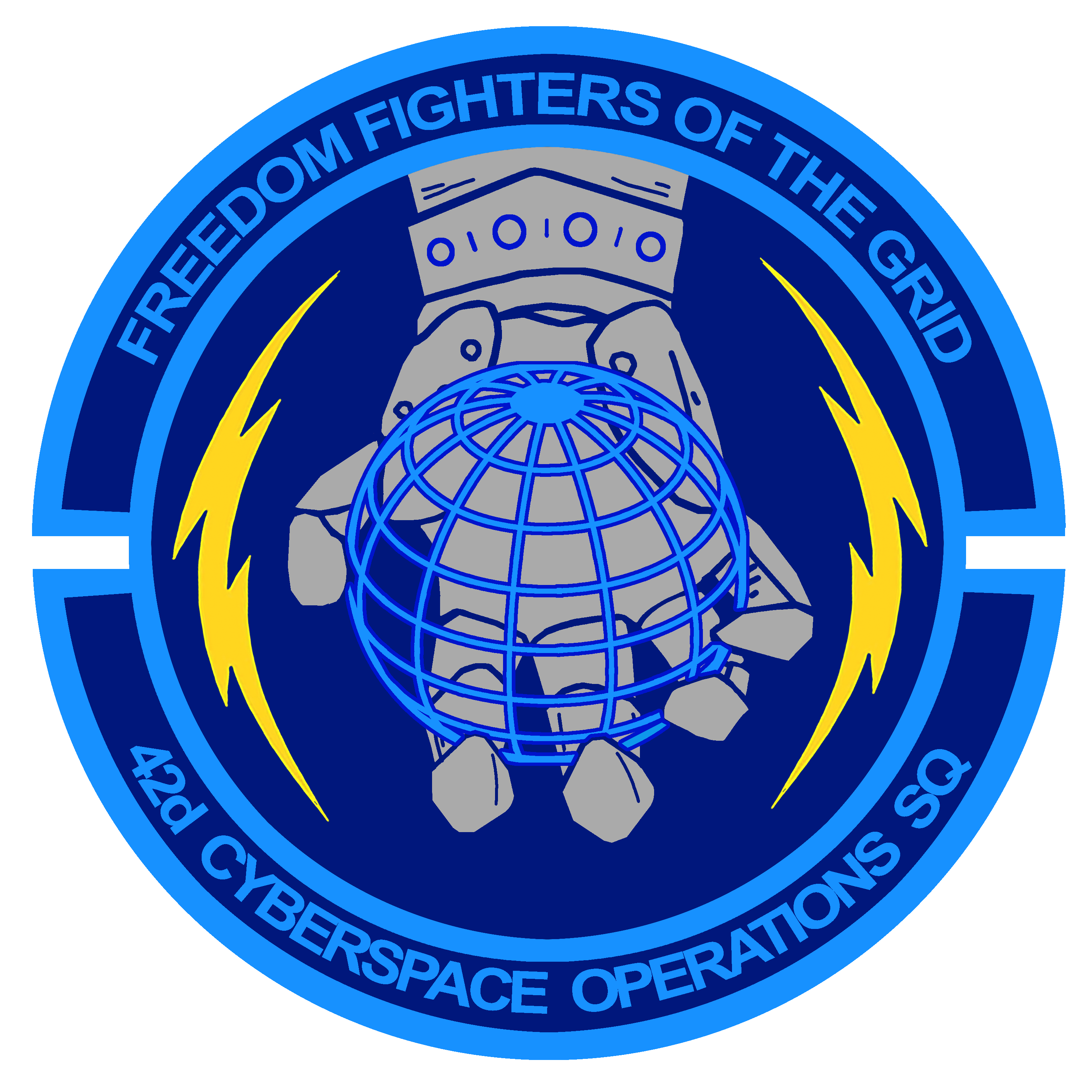
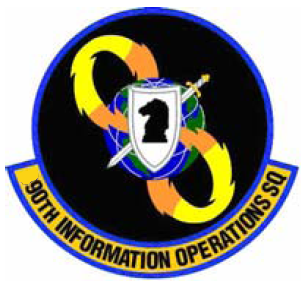
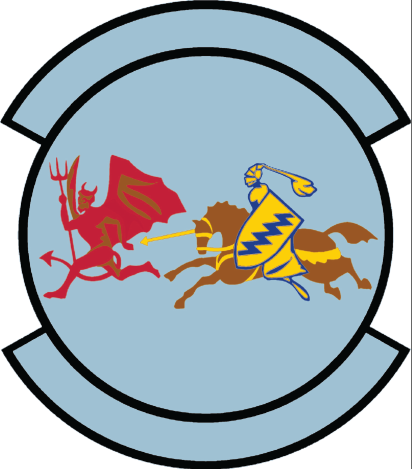
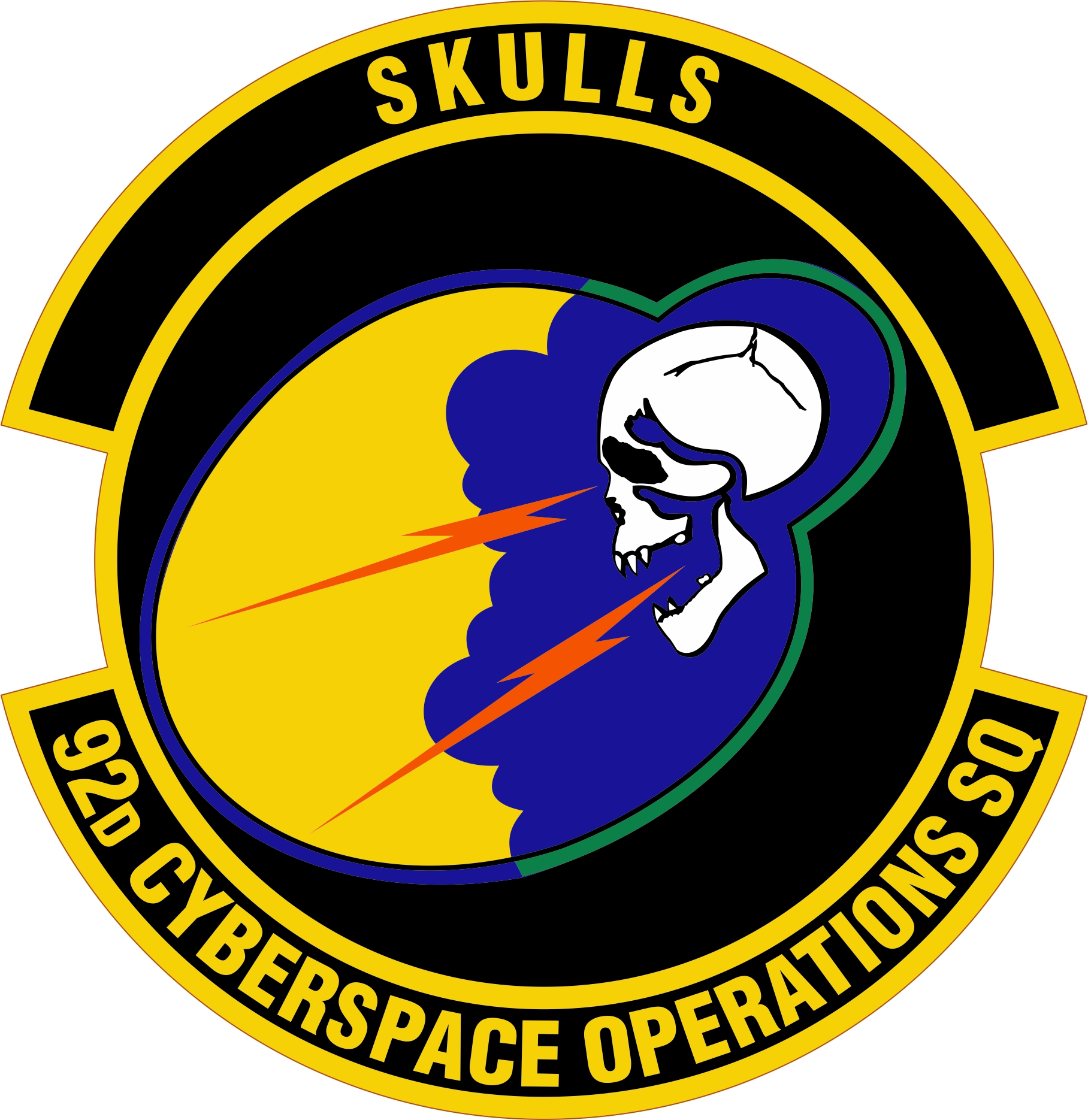
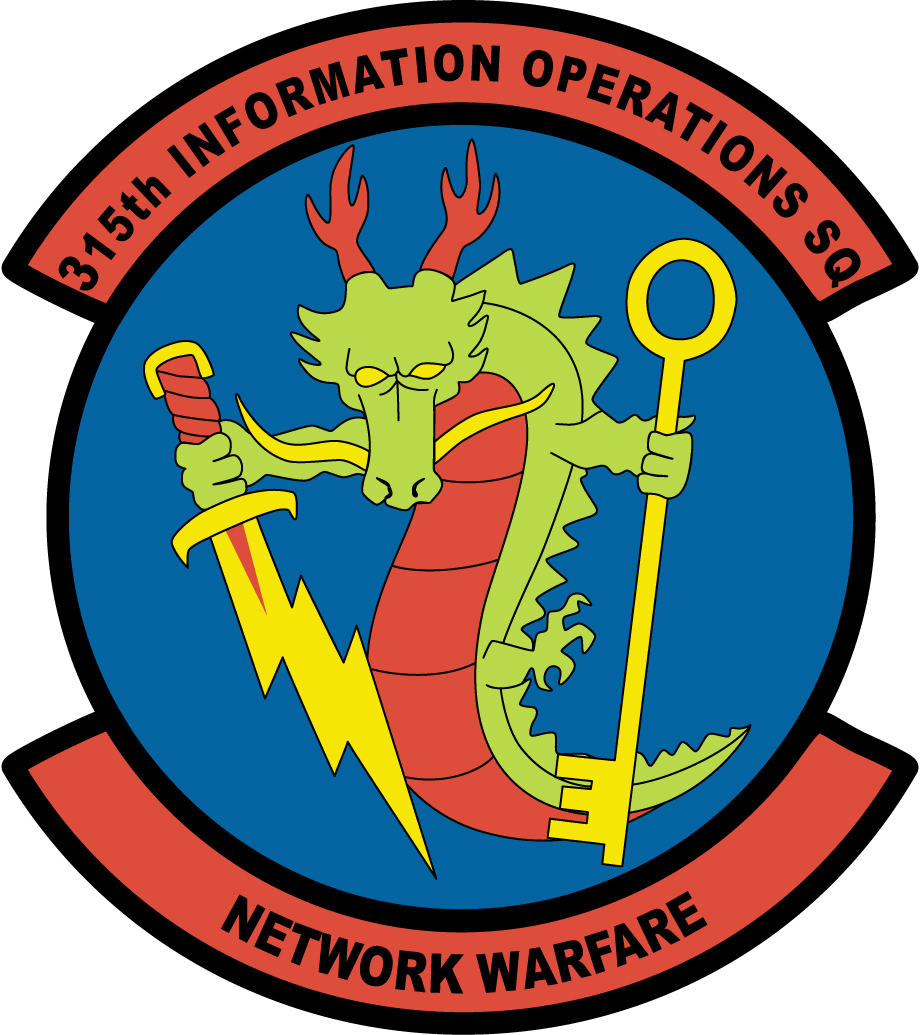
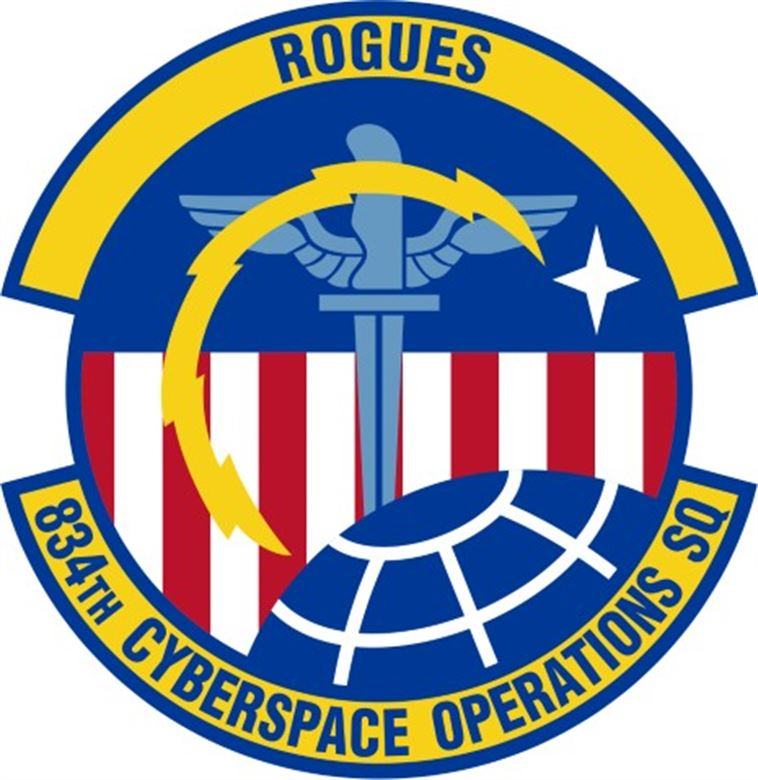
Squadron	Emblem	Location	Nickname	Note
42nd Cyberspace Operations Squadron		Scott Air Force Base	Freedom Fighters	Reserve associate to 835 COS; was 42nd Combat Communications Squadron
90th Cyberspace Operations Squadron		Lackland AFB	"Shadow Warriors"	318th Cyberspace Operations Group
91st Cyberspace Operations Squadron		Lackland AFB	"Demon Chasers"	67th Cyberspace Operations Group
92d Cyberspace Operations Squadron		Kelly Field Annex	"Skulls"	318th Cyberspace Operations Group
315th Cyberspace Operations Squadron		Lackland AFB or Ft Meade	"Dragons"	67th Cyberspace Operations Group
834th Cyberspace Operations Squadron		Lackland AFB	"Rogues"	567th Cyberspace Operations Group 300 CPT "Spartans" - 800 CPT "Night's Watch" - 801 CPT "Bounty Hunter"
835th Cyberspace Operations Squadron		Scott Air Force Base		Three Cyber Protection Teams (CPTs): 853rd "Ragin' Roosters," 854th "Reapers," and 855th "Los Cazadores" |-	837th Cyberspace Operations Squadron	Scott Air Force Base	Three Cyber Protection Teams: 900th, 901st, and 902nd

== Information Operations Squadrons ==
Squadron	Emblem	Location	Nickname	Note
23d IOS		Lackland AFB		Air Force Information Operations Center; 318th Information Operations Group
25th IOS				Redesignated 25th Intelligence Squadron
39th CYRS				
39th IOS		Hurlburt Field		Information Operations and Cyberspace Training
175th IOS				
229th IOS		Vermont		
273d IOS		Texas		
451st IOS		Menwith Hill, United Kingdom		Redesignated 451st Intelligence Squadron
566th IOS		Buckley Space Force Base		Redesignated 566th Intelligence Squadron

== Network Operations Squadrons ==
Squadron	Shield	Location	Nickname	Note
26th Network Operations Squadron		Maxwell AFB, Gunter Annex		
83d Network Operations Squadron		Langley AFB	"Black Knights"	Integrated Network Operations and Security Center (INOSC-East)
561st Network Operations Squadron		Peterson AFB	"Gryphons"	Integrated Network Operations and Security Center (INOSC-West)
689th Network Operations Squadron		Maxwell AFB, Gunter Annex		Reserve; reactivated after 70 years.

== Network Support Squadrons ==
Squadron	Emblem	Location	Nickname	Note
690th Network Support Squadron		Lackland AFB		Enterprise IT Service Desk

== Network Warfare Squadrons ==
Squadron	Emblem	Location	Nickname	Note
33d Network Warfare Squadron		Lackland AFB	"Mighty Griffins"	Performs Computer Network Defense
68th Network Warfare Squadron		Lackland AFB	"Purple Dragons"	
166th Network Warfare Squadron				Delaware National Guard
352d Network Warfare Squadron		Joint Base Pearl Harbor-Hickam	"Firebirds"	
426th Network Warfare Squadron		Lackland AFB		Redesignated 426th Cyberspace Operations Squadron in 2024.

== See also ==
- List of United States Air Force intelligence squadrons
- List of United States Air Force squadrons
