= Twenty-Fourth Air Force =

Numbered air force of the United States Air Force responsible for cyber forces

Twenty-Fourth Air Force (Air Forces Cyber)
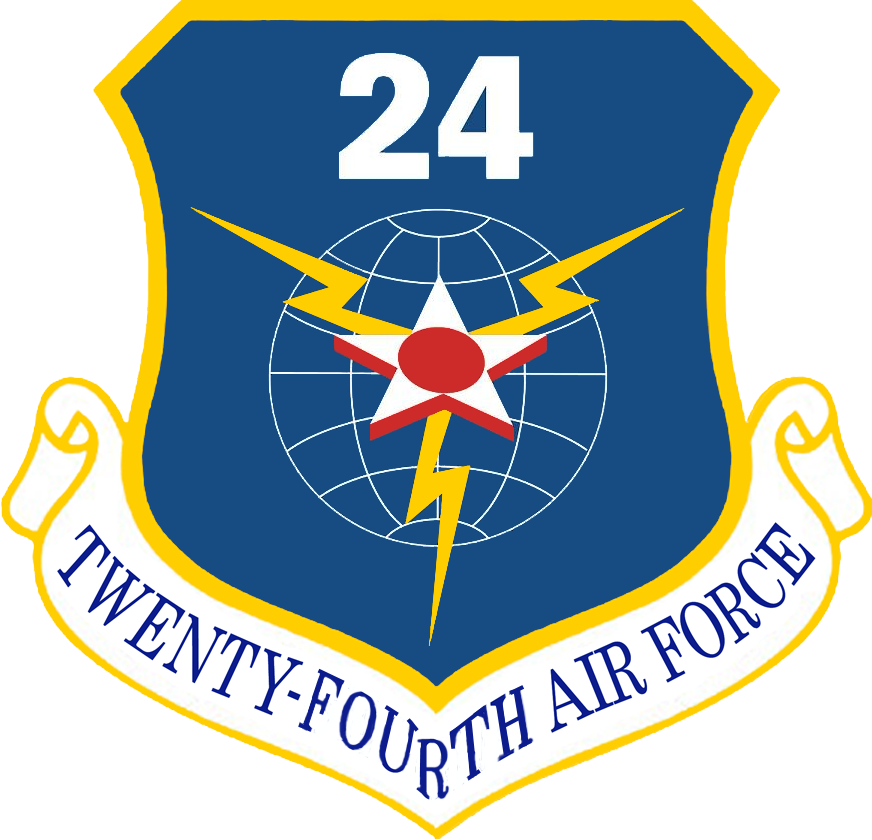
- Shield of the Twenty-Fourth Air Force
- Active: 7 December 2010 - 11 October 2019 (as Twenty-Fourth Air Force (Air Forces Cyber)); 11 August 2009 - 7 December 2010 (as Twenty-Fourth Air Force (Air Forces Strategic)) (14 years, 8 months)
- Country: United States of America
- Branch: United States Air Force
- Type: Numbered Air Force
- Role: Provide combat-ready air force cyber forces for U.S. Cyber Command
- Part of: Air Combat Command; U.S. Cyber Command
- Headquarters: Joint Base San Antonio, Texas, U.S.
- Decorations: Air Force Outstanding Unit Award

Twenty-Fourth Air Force / Air Forces Cyber (AFCYBER) was a Numbered Air Force within the United States Air Force. The Air Force consolidated its cyberspace combat and support forces into 24 AF. 24 AF was the Air Force component of U.S. Cyber Command.

On 11 October 2019, the 24th AF was merged with the 25th AF to form a reactivated 16th Air Force.

== Formation ==
The 24AF was originally intended to be a part of the now-defunct Air Force Cyber Command; however, 24AF became a component of Air Force Space Command on 18 August 2009.

In August 2008, then-Air Force Chief of Staff Gen. Norton A. Schwartz placed a stop order suspending implementation of Air Force Cyber Command, halting personnel assignments and unit activations. On 6 October 2008, following its annual Corona conference, the Air Force announced Air Force Cyber Command activation would not take place, and that a Numbered Air Force, 24AF, would gain the cyber warfare mission as part of Air Force Space Command.

One key element under 24 AF is the Air Force's primary network warfare wing, the 67th Cyberspace Wing, headquartered at Joint Base San Antonio-Lackland, Texas. The new NAF also gained:

- The 688th Cyberspace Wing – JBSA-Lackland, Texas
- The 689th Combat Communications Wing (now inactivated) – Robins Air Force Base, Georgia
- The 624th Operations Center (taking over duty and personnel of the 608th Air Force Network Operations Center) – JBSA-Lackland, Texas
- Although now administratively aligned under Air Combat Command, the Air Force Network Integration Center (formerly Air Force Communications Agency), works closely with 24AF on its mission to build and sustain Air Force networks.

Over 14,000 Airmen make up 24 AF. Many of these are in place at other organizations. Air Force units also host cyber specialists from other organizations. Before the 24 AF was activated, the Air Force had announced six possible locations for its headquarters: Barksdale AFB, LA; Lackland AFB, TX; Langley AFB, VA; Offutt AFB, NE; Peterson AFB, CO; and Scott AFB, IL.

On 15 May 2009, Air Force officials announced Lackland as the preferred alternative, and the decision was confirmed on 12 August 2009. The organization officially stood-up on 18 August 2009. On 22 January 2010, 24AF was certified by AFSPC/CC for its Initial Operational Capability. Full Operational Capability was declared on 1 October 2010.

== History ==
In 2014, 24 AF provided the Cyber Mission Force for the Exercise Red Flag for the first time. During U.S. Strategic Command's Exercise Global Lightning 14, 24AF operated as a Joint Force Headquarters-Cyber in support of a combatant commander during a large joint exercise for the first time. Twenty-Fourth Air Force was reassigned to Air Combat Command on 17 July 2018.

== Units ==
- 624th Operations Center, Lackland AFB
- 67th Cyberspace Wing, Lackland AFB
  - 67th Cyberspace Operations Group, Lackland AFB
    - 67th Operations Support Squadron, Lackland AFB
    - 91st Cyberspace Operations Squadron, Lackland AFB
    - 315th Cyberspace Operations Squadron, Ft. Meade
    - 352d Network Warfare Squadron, JBPHH
    - 390th Cyberspace Operations Squadron, Lackland AFB
  - 318th Cyberspace Operations Group, Lackland AFB
    - 39th Information Operations Squadron, Hurlburt Field
    - 90th Cyberspace Operations Squadron, Lackland AFB
    - 318th Operations Support Squadron, Lackland AFB
    - 346th Test Squadron, Lackland AFB
  - 567th Cyberspace Operations Group, Scott AFB
    - 92d Cyberspace Operations Squadron, Lackland AFB
    - 833d Cyberspace Operations Squadron, Lackland AFB
    - 834th Cyberspace Operations Squadron, Lackland AFB
    - 836th Cyberspace Operations Squadron, Lackland AFB
    - 835th Cyberspace Operations Squadron, Scott AFB
    - 837th Cyberspace Operations Squadron, Scott AFB
- 688th Cyberspace Wing, Lackland AFB
    - 688th Operations Support Squadron, Lackland AFB
  - 5th Combat Communications Group, Robins AFB
    - 5th Combat Communications Support Squadron, Robins AFB
    - 51st Combat Communications Squadron, Robins AFB
    - 52d Combat Communications Squadron, Robins AFB
  - 26th Cyberspace Operations Group, Lackland AFB
    - 26th Network Operations Squadron, Maxwell AFB
    - 26th Operations Support Squadron, Lackland AFB
    - 33d Network Warfare Squadron, Lackland AFB
    - 68th Network Warfare Squadron, Lackland AFB
    - 426th Network Warfare Squadron, Lackland AFB
  - 38th Cyberspace Engineering Installation Group, Tinker AFB
    - 38th Contracting Squadron, Tinker AFB
    - 38th Cyberspace Readiness Squadron, Tinker AFB
    - 38th Engineering Squadron, Tinker AFB
    - 38th Operations Support Squadron, Tinker AFB
    - 85th Engineering Installation Squadron, Keesler AFB
  - 690th Cyberspace Operations Group, Lackland AFB
    - 83d Network Operations Squadron, Langley AFB
    - 561st Network Operations Squadron, Peterson AFB
    - 690th Intelligence Support Squadron, Lackland AFB
    - 690th Network Support Squadron, Lackland AFB
    - 690th Cyberspace Operations Squadron, JBPHH
    - 691st Cyberspace Operations Squadron, Ramstein AB

== List of commanders ==
No.	Commander		Term		
No.	Portrait	Name	Took office	Left office	Term length
1	Richard E. Webber	Major General; Richard E. Webber	11 August 2009	29 April 2011	1 year, 261 days
2	Suzanne M. Vautrinot	Major General; Suzanne M. Vautrinot	29 April 2011	31 June 2013	2 years, 62 days
3	James K. McLaughlin	Major General; James K. McLaughlin	31 June 2013	31 July 2014	1 year
4	B. Edwin Wilson	Major General; B. Edwin Wilson	31 July 2014	17 June 2016	1 year, 322 days
5	Christopher P. Weggeman	Major General; Christopher P. Weggeman	17 June 2016	17 July 2018	2 years
6	Robert J. Skinner	Major General; Robert J. Skinner	17 July 2018	11 October 2019	1 year, 86 days

== See also ==
- List of cyber warfare forces
