= Michelle L. Hayworth =

American Air Force general

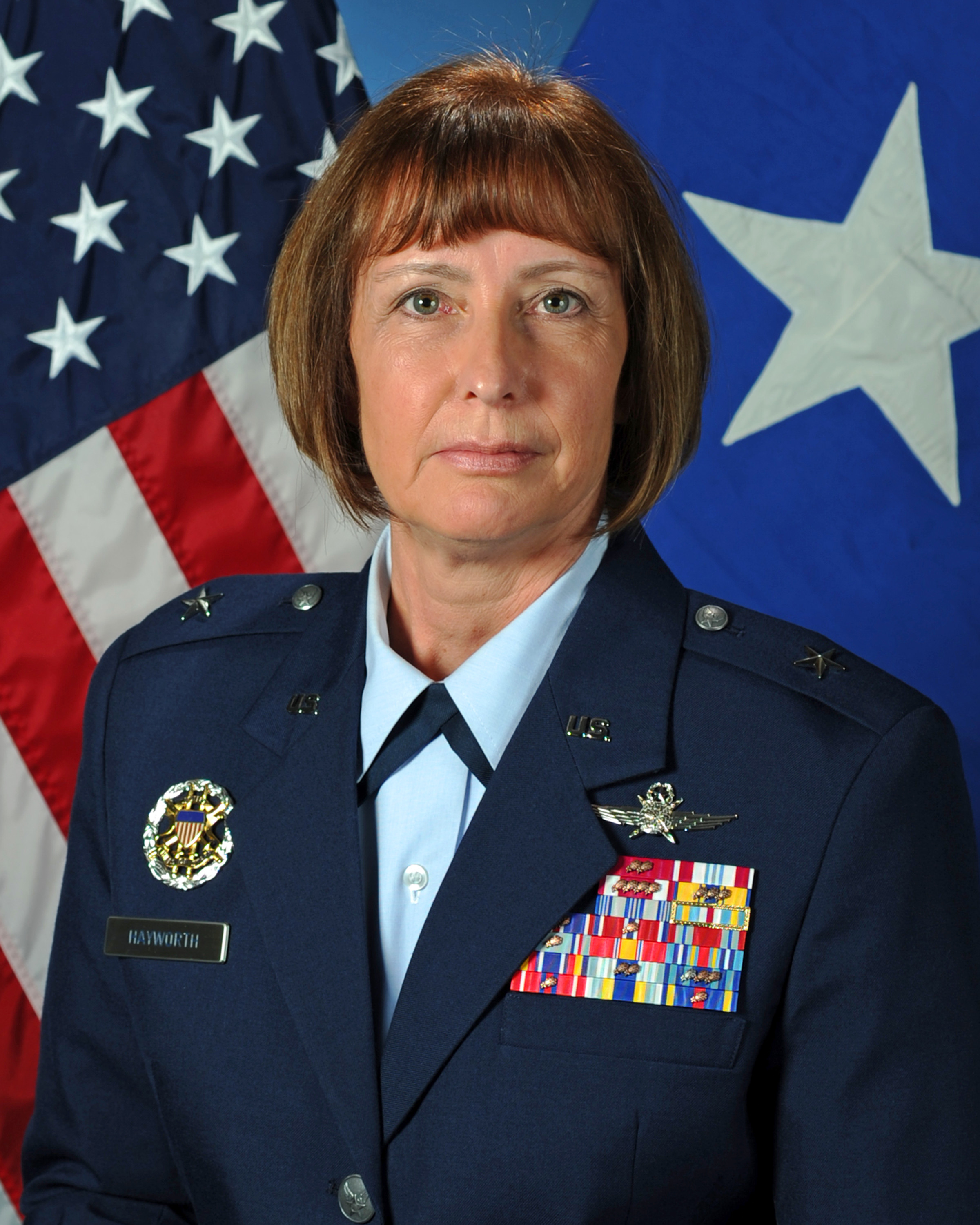
- Allegiance: United States
- Branch: United States Air Force
- Service years: 1994 - present
- Rank: Brigadier General
- Commands: 688th Cyberspace Wing; 690th Network Support Group; 747th Communications Squadrons; 15th Communications Squadron; 354th Communications Squadron

Michelle L. Hayworth is a brigadier general in the United States Air Force. She currently serves as the Director of Command, Control, Communications, and Cyber Systems, for U.S. Transportation Command at Scott AFB.

== Dates of promotion ==
Insignia	Rank	Date
	Brigadier general	July 3, 2018
	Colonel	Sept. 1, 2011
	Lieutenant colonel	Sept. 1, 2007
	Major	Dec. 1, 2003
	Captain	July 28, 1997
	First lieutenant	July 28, 1995
	Second lieutenant	July 28, 1993

Military offices
Preceded by David W. Snoddy	Vice Commander of the Twenty-Fourth Air Force, later Sixteenth Air Force; 2018–2020	Succeeded by David M. Gaedecke
Preceded by Robert K. Lyman	Director for Command, Control, Communications, and Cyber Systems and Deputy Director for Cyberspace Operations of the United States Transportation Command; 2020–present	Incumbent
