= Chad Raduege =

U.S. Air Force general

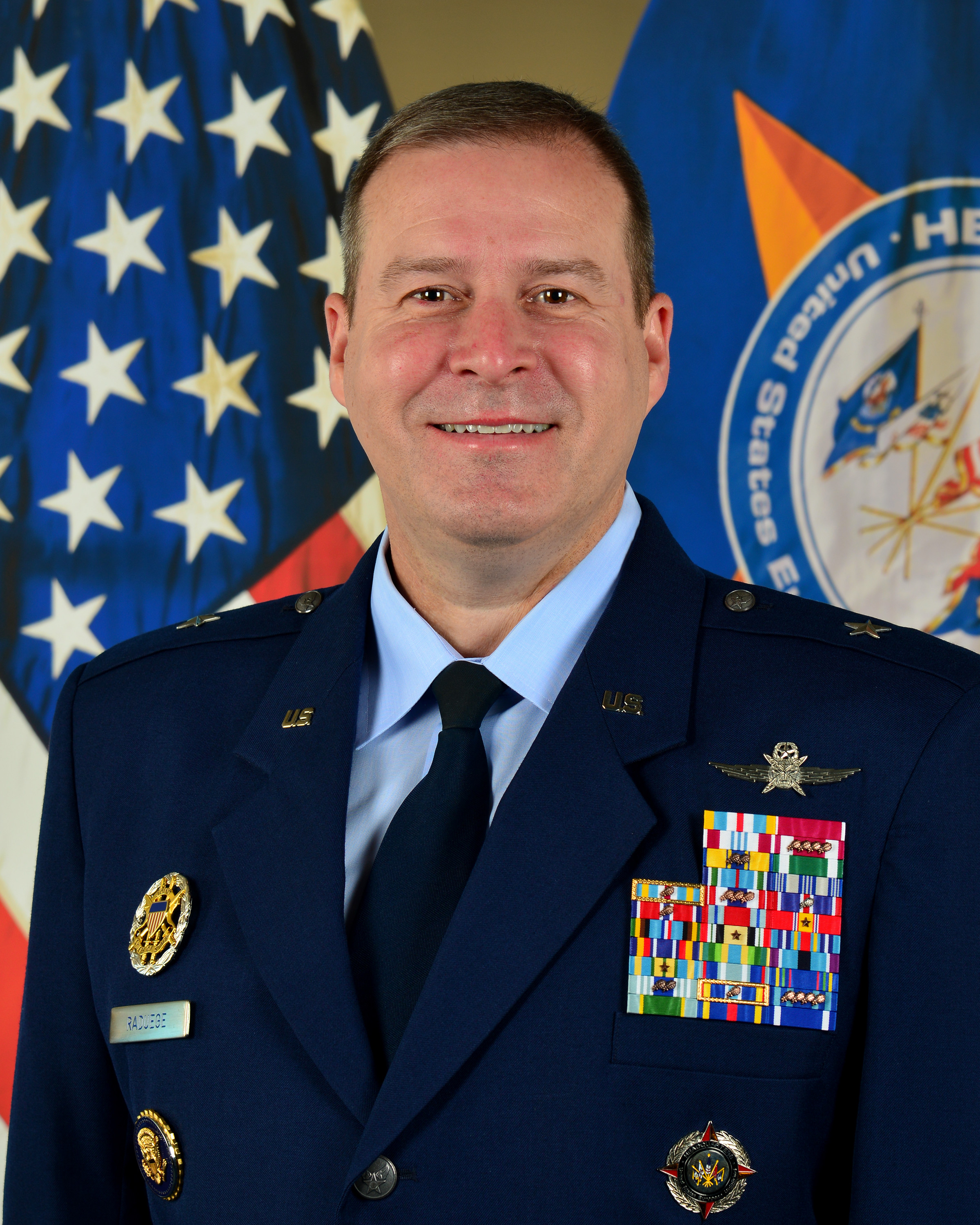
- Official portrait, 2021
- Military career
- Allegiance: United States
- Branch: United States Air Force
- Service years: 1994–present
- Rank: Brigadier General
- Commands: White House Communications Agency; 690th Cyberspace Operations Group; 690th Network Support Group; 747th Communications Squadron; 366th Communications Squadron
- Awards: Defense Superior Service Medal; Legion of Merit

Chad D. Raduege is a United States Air Force brigadier general who served as the Director of Command, Control, Communications and Computers/Cyber and Chief Information Officer of the United States European Command. He previously was the Director of Cyberspace and Information Dominance of the Air Combat Command.

Military offices
| Preceded by Cleophus Thomas Jr. | Commander of the White House Communications Agency; 2016–2018 | Succeeded by James F. Riley |
| Preceded by Jason K. Sutton | Director of Cyberspace and Information Dominance of the Air Combat Command; 2018–2021 | Succeeded by Heather Blackwell |
| Preceded by Maria A. Biank | Director of Command, Control, Communications and Computers/Cyber and Chief Information Officer of the United States European Command; 2021–2023 | Succeeded by John H. Phillips |
