= 688th Cyberspace Wing =

- Active: 1953–present
- Country: United States
- Branch: United States Air Force
- Role: Cyberspace operations
- Size: 1388 military and civilians
- Part of: Air Combat Command
- Garrison/HQ: Joint Base Lackland-San Antonio, Texas
- Decorations: Air Force Outstanding Unit Award; Air Force Organizational Excellence Award

Commanders
- Current commander: Colonel Chantel M. Booker
- Current Vice-Commander: Colonel Jeffrey A. Blankenship

Insignia
- 688th Cyberspace Wing emblem (Note: Approved 14 June 1994. Description: Gules, a globe enhanced Azure, gridlined Argent surmounted by a mullet of the last color mentioned, fimbriated Or, overall four lightning flashes saltirewise of the like [color], all within a diminished bordure of the fourth [color mentioned]. Significance: Ultramarine blue and Air Force yellow are the Air Force colors. Blue alludes to the sky, the primary theater of Air Force operations. Yellow refers to the sun and the excellence required of Air Force personnel. The globe represents the Wing’s commitment to worldwide support of air, sea, and land forces with information necessary to defend the peace. The star symbolizes the Wing’s joint nature to provide combat effective information to all sources in any application of force. The five points of the star denote the primary functions of the Wing to provide combat support, databases, analyses, securities, and acquisition and testing support. The lightning bolts stand for the unit’s history of work in the electromagnetic spectrum and the Wing’s mission to control and protect during contingencies and war. Brief History, p. 15.)

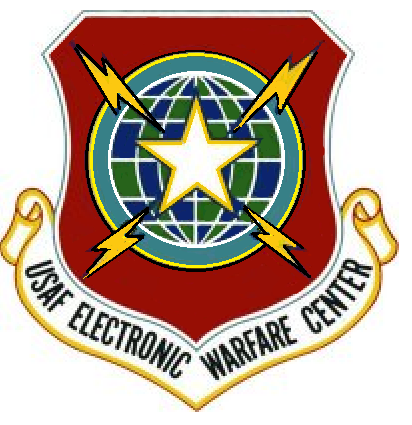
- Air Force Electronic Warfare Center emblem

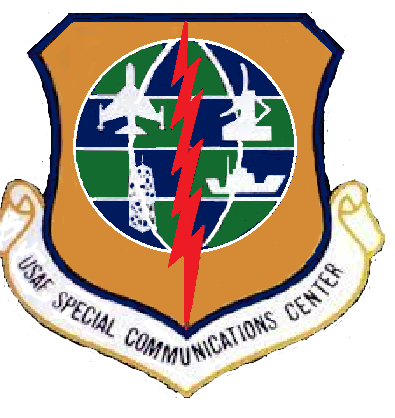
- Air Force Special Communications Center emblem (Note: Significance: The Air Force colors, ultramarine blue and golden yellow, are used in the design. The color blue alludes to the sky, the primary theater of Air Force operations, and the yellow to the sun and excellence of personnel in assigned tasks. The globe represents world-wide effort. The colors green and blue refer to the air, land, and sea. The plane, ground-based radar, and ship allude to the all-service operation. The antenna reflects the communications effort. The lightning bolt represents the electronic environment in which the center operates.)

The United States Air Force's 688th Cyberspace Wing is a cyberspace operations unit located at Kelly Field Annex, Joint Base San Antonio-Lackland, Texas. It was first organized in July 1953 as the Air Force Special Communications Center. It produced long term intelligence information and developed intelligence gathering techniques. Losing its communications intelligence functions, it focused on electronic warfare, and in July 1975 was redesignated the Air Force Electronic Warfare Center. As its mission grew to include all elements of the spectrum, it became the Air Force Information Warfare Center in September 1993 and the Air Force Information Operations Center in October 2006. In 2009, it was reassigned from the intelligence community to Air Combat Command and became the 688th Information Operations Wing, assuming its current name in September 2013.

== Mission ==
The wing delivers information operations and engineering infrastructure for air, space, and cyberspace military operations. It supports national, joint and Air Force operations.

== Organization ==
Unless otherwise indicated, units are based at Kelly Field Annex, Joint Base San Antonio-Lackland, Texas, and subordinate units are located at the same location as their commanding group.

Wing Staff

- 688th Operations Support Squadron

5th Combat Communications Group (Robins AFB, Georgia)

- 5th Combat Communications Support Squadron
- 51st Combat Communications Squadron
- 52nd Combat Communications Squadron

26th Cyberspace Operations Group

- 26th Network Operations Squadron (Gunter Annex, Maxwell AFB, Alabama)
- 33rd Cyberspace Operations Squadron
- 68th Network Warfare Squadron

38th Cyberspace Engineering Installation Group

- 38th Contracting Squadron (Joint Base San Antonio-Lackland, Texas)
- 38th Engineering Squadron
- 38th Operations Support Squadron
- 85th Engineering Installation Squadron (Keesler AFB, Mississippi)

690th Cyberspace Operations Group

- 83rd Network Operations Squadron (Joint Base Langley-Eustis, Virginia)
- 561st Network Operations Squadron (Peterson AFB, Colorado)
- 690th Cyberspace Operations Squadron (Joint Base Pearl Harbor-Hickam, Hawaii)
- 690th Intelligence Support Squadron
- 690th Cyberspace Control Squadron
- 691st Cyberspace Operations Squadron (Ramstein AB, Germany)
- 692nd Cyberspace Operations Squadron (Eglin AFB, Florida)

== History ==
=== Air Force Special Communications Center ===
United States Air Force Security Service (USAFSS) organized the 6901st and 6902d Special Communications Centers at Brooks Air Force Base, Texas. These two organizations assumed the operational functions previously performed by the Deputy Chief of Staff, United States Air Force Security Service. One month later, these two organizations moved to Kelly Air Force Base, located on the other side of San Antonio, Texas. A week later, they were replaced by the Air Force Special Communications Center (AFSCC).

The center's original mission focused on five key areas. First, it produced and disseminated long-term intelligence data for USAFSS and the Air Force. Second, it oversaw the USAFSS School for intelligence specialists. Third, it provided technical guidance and operational assistance to USAFSS field units. Fourth, it assisted the USAFSS Deputy Chief of Staff for Operations with developing and testing operational procedures and techniques in support of both the command's mission and Air Force intelligence efforts. Finally, it directed and monitored operation of the Special Security Office system.

However, the National Security Agency (NSA) wanted to centralize communications intelligence and cryptological functions under a single organizational umbrella. It opposed the Air Force’s plan to use the center as an autonomous communications intelligence processing center. NSA described AFSCC as “an unwarranted duplicative processing facility.” Those arguments gradually gained traction and by 1966, NSA quietly began transferring functions from AFSCC to Fort George G. Meade, Maryland. The effort concluded on 30 June 1969 when the center ceased processing communications intelligence altogether.

Following the loss of its communications intelligence mission, the center shifted its focus to analyzing electronic warfare efforts using signals intelligence inputs. In March 1967, it commenced production of electronic warfare evaluations known as Comfy Coat reports, which initially focused on intelligence requirements in Southeast Asia. The reports gradually expanded in scope as electronic warfare gained prominence within the Department of Defense and eventually included findings related to Army, Navy, and Marine Corps electronic warfare capabilities.

=== Air Force Electronic Warfare Center ===
To recognize the center's role in electronic warfare, the Air Force redesignated AFSCC as the Air Force Electronic Warfare Center (AFEWC) on 1 July 1975. The center focused on exploring new and state-of-the-art electronic warfare technologies to counter the command and control systems of potential adversaries. Additionally, AFEWC analyzed defense suppression techniques for Air Force assets. By the middle of the 1980s, it was the primary source of electronic warfare and command, control, and communications countermeasures analysis and advice for the Air Force. The center employed computers with high-speed microprocessors, to provide senior battle commanders with analytical reports on the use of electronic warfare in exercise and real-world scenarios. These contributions eventually played a crucial role in the effective use of electronic warfare during Operation Desert Storm in the early 1990s. 10 May 1988: In May 1988, the Air Force added electronic combat testing and acquisition to the center's mission.

=== Air Force Information Warfare Center ===
Air Force successes in exploiting enemy information systems during Operation Desert Storm persuaded senior military leaders that electronic warfare capabilities could combine with the strategies and tactics of command and control warfare to enable operations across the entire information spectrum. The resulting emphasis on information warfare prompted the Air Force on 10 September 1993 to integrate the technical expertise from the Securities Directorate of the Air Force Cryptologic Support Center and intelligence skills from the Air Force Intelligence Command into the AFEWC, redesignating it the Air Force Information Warfare Center (AFIWC) on 10 September 1993. The new center served as the Air Force’s center for information superiority. It explored, applied, and migrated offensive and defensive information warfare capabilities for operations, acquisition, and testing. The center also provided advanced information warfare training for the Air Force and continued its support of warfighters in contingencies and exercises through quantitative analysis, modeling and simulation, and database and technical expertise in communications and computer security. In March 1997, the Air Force established the Information Warfare Battlelab as a directorate in AFIWC.

The center was assigned the 39th Intelligence Squadron on 1 October 1998. The following year, the squadron became the 39th Information Operations Squadron. In 2000, it was assigned two groups, the 38th Engineering Installation Group in February, and the 318th Information Operations Group in August. With the assignment of the 318th Group, the 39th Information Operations Squadron was transferred to it.

=== Air Force Information Operations Center ===
The inclusion of cyberspace as a separate warfighting domain in the Air Force mission statement unveiled in December 2005 prompted military leaders to rethink and broaden the information warfare concept, resulting in a new emphasis on information operations. This emphasis translated into yet another organizational change on 1 October 2006 when the Air Force redesignated AFIWC as the Air Force Information Operations Center (AFIOC). AFIOC focused on both the innovation and integration of information operations and on creating information operations capabilities to meet requirements for missions in air, space, and cyberspace. Additionally, it performed information operations analysis for combat operations, targeting, and acquisition programs. In addition to exploring, demonstrating, and exercising information operations capabilities, the center tested weapons, developed tactics, trained forces, and assessed information operations vulnerabilities of units and systems for both offensive and defensive counter-information missions.

In May 2007, after 54 years of being assigned to United States Air Force Security Service and its successors, the center transferred to Air Combat Command (ACC) as part of Eighth Air Force. (Note: Although still assigned to Air Intelligence Agency, the center had been part of Air Combat Command (ACC) since 1 February 2001, when the agency was assigned to ACC.)

=== From center to wing ===
On 18 August 2009, the Air Force reassigned the center from ACC to Air Force Space Command (AFSPC) and redesignated it the 688th Information Operations Wing. AFSPC assigned it to Twenty-Fourth Air Force. The wing was a multi-disciplined organization capable of delivering information operations and engineering installation capabilities integrated across the air, space, and cyberspace domains in support of the joint warfighting team. On 13 September 2013, the wing was redesignated the 688th Cyberspace Wing, the first Air Force wing designated as a cyberspace wing.

With the activation on 1 December 2015 of the 688th Cyberspace Operations Group at Scott Air Force Base, Illinois and the follow-on activation of its full complement of five cyberspace operations squadrons, the wing stood at three groups, fifteen squadrons, four detachments, and one operating location. In June 2018, the 690th Cyberspace Operations Group and 5th Combat Communications Group were assigned to the wing. Later that month, the 688th Cyberspace Operations Group was inactivated and replaced by the 567th Cyberspace Operations Group, which was assigned to the 67th Cyberspace Wing. In October 2019, the wing returned to ACC when it was reassigned to Sixteenth Air Force.

Today the wing has a staff of nearly 1,400 civil and military personnel, and based in the same location as United States Strategic Command's Joint Information Operations Warfare Center. It is currently commanded by Colonel James Hewitt and is subordinate to Sixteenth Air Force.

== Lineage ==
- Designated on 24 July 1953 as the Air Force Special Communications Center

Organized on 8 August 1953 (Note: per Brief History. The Twenty-Fourth Air Force Fact Sheet says 1 August.)

- Redesignated Air Force Electronic Warfare Center on 1 July 1975
- Redesignated Air Force Information Warfare Center on 10 September 1993
- Redesignated Air Force Information Operations Center on 1 October 2006
- Redesignated 688th Information Operations Wing on 18 August 2009
- Redesignated 688th Cyberspace Wing on 13 September 2013

=== Assignments ===
- United States Air Force Security Service (later Electronic Security Command, Air Force Intelligence Command, Air Intelligence Agency), 1 August 1953
- Eighth Air Force, 1 May 2007
- Twenty-Fourth Air Force, 18 August 2009
- Sixteenth Air Force, 11 October 2019 – present

=== Components ===
Groups

- 5th Combat Communications Group, 4 June 2018 – present
- 38th Engineering Installation Group (later 38th Cyberspace Engineering Group, 38th Cyberspace Engineering and Installation Group): 3 February 2000 – present
- 318th Information Operations Group (later 318th Cyberspace Operations Group): 1 August 2000 – c. 29 June 2018
- 688th Cyberspace Operations Group, 1 February 2015 – c. 29 June 2018
- 690th Cyberspace Operations Group, 4 June 2018 – present

Squadrons

- 39th Intelligence Squadron (later 39th Information Operations Squadron), 1 October 1998 – 1 August 2000
- 688th Operations Support Squadron, 29 June 2018 – present

Other

- Air Force Information Warfare Battlelab (later Air Force Information Operations Battlelab), 17 March 1997 – 1 October 2007
- United States Air Force Security Service School, 8 August 1953 – unknown

=== Stations ===
- Kelly Air Force Base (later Kelly Annex, Joint Base San Antonio-Lackland), 1 August 1953 – present

=== Awards ===
Award streamer	Award	Dates	Notes
	Air Force Outstanding Unit Award	1 November 1965 – 1 November 1967	Air Force Special Communications Center
	Air Force Outstanding Unit Award	18 August 2009 – 1 October 2010	688th Information Operations Wing
	Air Force Outstanding Unit Award	1 October 2013 – 30 September 2014	688th Cyberspace Wing
	Air Force Outstanding Unit Award	1 June 2019 – 31 May 2020	688th Cyberspace Wing
	Air Force Outstanding Unit Award	1 June 2020 – 31 May 2021	688th Cyberspace Wing
	Air Force Organizational Excellence Award	1 January 1974 – 1 January 1976	Air Force Special Communications Center (later Air Force Electronic Warfare Center)
	Air Force Organizational Excellence Award	(2) Jan 1976 – 1 Jan 1979	Air Force Electronic Warfare Center
	Air Force Organizational Excellence Award	2 January 1979 – 31 December 1981	Air Force Electronic Warfare Center
	Air Force Organizational Excellence Award	1 January 1988 – 31 December 1989	Air Force Electronic Warfare Center
	Air Force Organizational Excellence Award	1 January 1990 – 31 December 1991	Air Force Electronic Warfare Center
	Air Force Organizational Excellence Award	1 May 1993 – 31 May 1994	Air Force Electronic Warfare Center (later Air Force Information Warfare Center)
	Air Force Organizational Excellence Award	1 June 1994 – 31 May 1996	Air Force Information Warfare Center
	Air Force Organizational Excellence Award	1 June 1996 – 31 May 1997	Air Force Information Warfare Center
	Air Force Organizational Excellence Award	1 June 1997 – 31 May 1998	Air Force Information Warfare Center
	Air Force Organizational Excellence Award	1 June 2002 – 31 May 2003	Air Force Information Warfare Center
	Air Force Organizational Excellence Award	1 June 2003 – 31 May 2004	Air Force Information Warfare Center
	Air Force Organizational Excellence Award	1 June 2004 – 31 May 2006	Air Force Information Warfare Center

== List of commanders ==
No.	Commander		Term		
No.	Portrait	Name	Took office	Left office	Term length
1	Michael Harasimowicz	Colonel; Michael Harasimowicz	July 2013	16 July 2015	~2 years, 15 days
2	Michelle L. Hayworth	Colonel; Michelle L. Hayworth	16 July 2015	June 2017	~1 year, 320 days
3	Eric P. DeLange	Colonel; Eric P. DeLange	June 2017	25 June 2019	~2 years, 24 days
4	Steven J. Anderson	Colonel; Steven J. Anderson	25 June 2019	1 July 2021	2 years, 6 days
5	James V. Hewitt	Colonel; James V. Hewitt	1 July 2021	3 July 2023	2 years, 1 day
6	Joshua H. Rockhill	Colonel; Joshua H. Rockhill	3 July 2023	17 July 2025	~2 years, 14 days
6	Chantel M. Booker	Colonel; Chantel M. Booker	17 July 2025	present	~1 year, 25 days

== See also ==
- List of cyber warfare forces
