= Richard E. Webber =

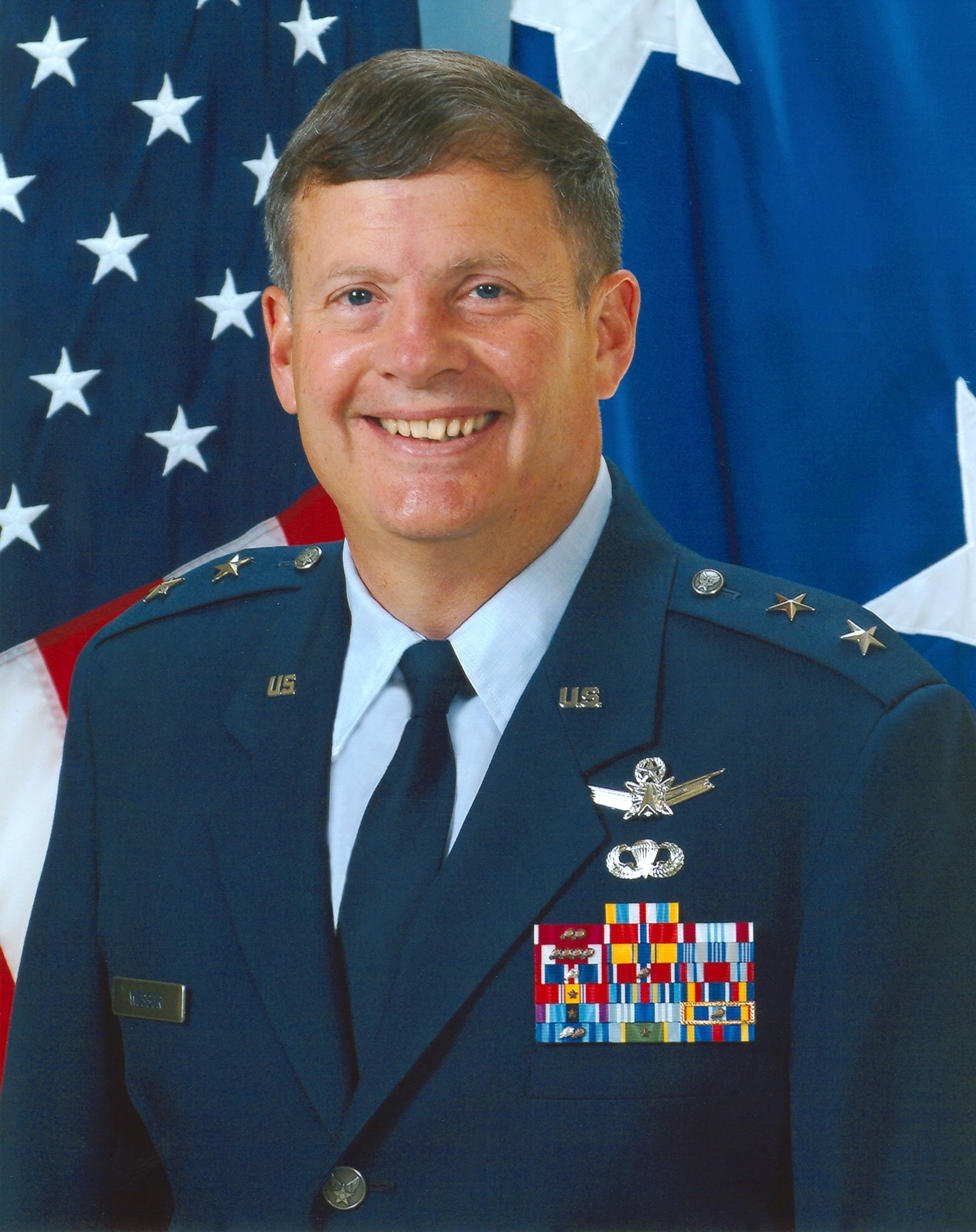
- Military career
- Allegiance: United States
- Branch: United States Air Force
- Service years: 1975–2011
- Rank: Major General
- Commands: Twenty-Fourth Air Force; 21st Space Wing; 50th Space Wing; 321st Missile Group; 341st Operations Group; 508th Strategic Missile Squadron
- Awards: Air Force Distinguished Service Medal (2); Defense Superior Service Medal; Legion of Merit (3); Bronze Star Medal

Richard E. Webber is a retired United States Air Force major general. He was the first commander of the Twenty-Fourth Air Force, which was focused on cyberspace operations. The Twenty-Fourth Air Force was located in San Antonio, Texas, and was stood up in place of the originally proposed larger Major Command organization, Air Force Cyber Command. Webber graduated from the United States Air Force Academy in 1975 and has worked in the space and missile career field.

== Assignments ==
1. February 1976 – October 1980, missile combat crew member, instructor missile deputy combat crew commander, instructor missile combat crew commander, wing emergency war order planner and instructor, and emergency rocket communication system emergency war order instructor, 351st Strategic Missile Wing, Whiteman Air Force Base, Missouri
2. October 1980 – October 1981, Air Staff Training Program officer, Strategic Missile Division and Force Analysis Division, Air Force Studies and Analysis, Washington, D.C.
3. November 1981 – August 1984, Chief, Future Intercontinental Ballistic Missile Systems Branch, Directorate of Plans and Operations, Headquarters Strategic Air Command, Offutt AFB, Nebraska
4. August 1984 – June 1985, student, College of Command and Staff, Naval War College, Newport, R.I.
5. June 1985 – April 1989, missile operations staff officer, Strategic Offensive Force Division, Air Force Plans Directorate, Washington, D.C.
6. April 1989 – July 1991, Commander, 508th Strategic Missile Squadron, Whiteman AFB, Missouri
7. August 1991 – August 1992, student, Industrial College of the Armed Forces, Washington, D.C.
8. August 1992 – July 1994, Chairman, Allied Data Systems Interoperability Agency, and Chief, Systems Interoperability Branch, Headquarters North Atlantic Treaty Organization and International Military Staff, Brussels, Belgium
9. July 1994 – July 1995, Commander, 341st Support Group, Malmstrom AFB, Montana
10. July 1995 – July 1996, Commander, 341st Operations Group, Malmstrom AFB, Montana
11. July 1996 – October 1997, Commander, 321st Missile Group, Grand Forks AFB, North Dakota
12. October 1997 – June 1999, Vice Commander, Aerospace Command and Control & Intelligence, Surveillance and Reconnaissance Center, Langley AFB, Virginia
13. June 1999 – April 2001, Commander, 50th Space Wing, Schriever AFB, Colorado
14. April 2001 – April 2002, Inspector General, Air Force Space Command, Peterson AFB, Colorado (October 2001 – March 2002, Assistant Combined Air Operations Center Director for Space and Information Warfare, Prince Sultan Air Base, Saudi Arabia)
15. April 2002 – August 2002, Deputy Director, Operations, Headquarters AFSPC, Peterson AFB, Colorado
16. August 2002 – February 2003, Director, Communications and Information Systems, and Chief Information Officer, Headquarters AFSPC, Peterson AFB, Colorado
17. February 2003 – March 2004, Director, Logistics and Communications, Chief Information Officer and Chief Sustainment Officer, Headquarters AFSPC, Peterson AFB, Colo. (March 2003 – May 2003, Deputy Director of Operations for Space and Information Operations, U.S. Central Command, Southwest Asia)
18. March 2004 – November 2005, Commander, 21st Space Wing, Peterson AFB, Colorado
19. November 2005 – January 2008, Director of Installations and Mission Support, Headquarters AFSPC, Peterson AFB, Colorado
20. January 2008 – August 2009, Assistant Deputy Chief for Air, Space and Information Operations, Plans and Requirements, Headquarters U.S. Air Force, Washington, D.C.
21. August 2009 – April 2011, Commander Twenty-Fourth Air Force, Lackland AFB, Texas

== Effective dates of promotion ==
- Second Lieutenant: June 4, 1975
- First Lieutenant: June 4, 1977
- Captain: June 4, 1979
- Major: Aug. 1, 1984
- Lieutenant Colonel: July 1, 1988
- Colonel: Jan. 1, 1992
- Brigadier General: Jan. 1, 2002
- Major General: July 14, 2006
