= 26th Cyberspace Operations Group =

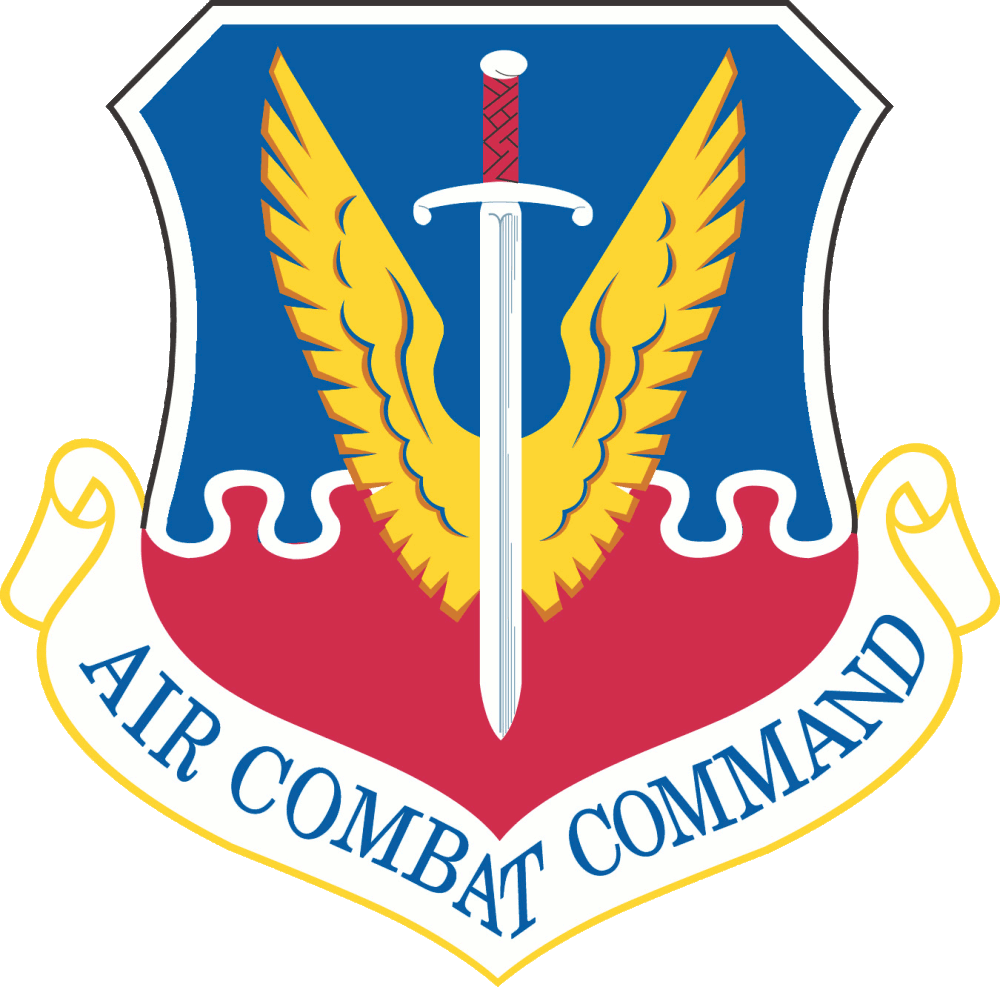
26th Cyberspace Operations Group
- Active: 1986–present
- Country: United States
- Branch: United States Air Force
- Role: Cyber Operations
- Part of: Air Combat Command
- Garrison/HQ: Lackland Air Force Base, Texas
- Decorations: Air Force Outstanding Unit Award

Insignia
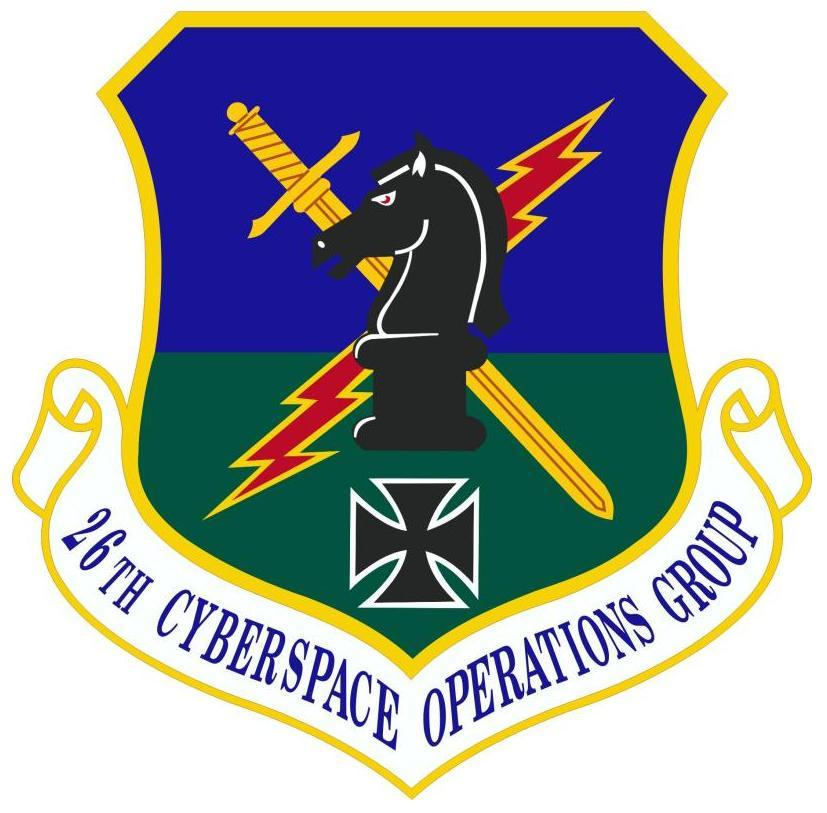
- 26th Cyberspace Operations Group emblem

The United States Air Force's 26th Cyberspace Operations Group is a network operations unit located at Lackland Air Force Base, Texas. The group was commanded by Colonel Randy Witt in 2023.

== History ==
In 2016 an Air Force cyberspace network defense system attained full operational capability.

== Lineage ==
- Activated as the 6914th Electronic Security Squadron on 1 October 1986

Redesignated as 26th Technical Group on 1 March 1993
Redesignated as 26th Intelligence Group on 1 October 1993
Redesignated as 26th Information Operations Group on 1 August 2000
Redesignated as 26th Network Operations Group on 5 July 2006
Redesignated as 26th Cyberspace Operations Group 1 October 2013

=== Assignments ===
- 6910th Electronic Security Wing, 1 October 1986
- 691st Electronic Security Wing, 15 July 1988
- 26th Intelligence Wing, 1 October 1991
- 67th Intelligence Wing (later 67th Information Operations Wing, 67th Network Warfare Wing, 67th Cyberspace Wing), 1 October 1993 – present
- 688th Cyberspace Wing, 4 Jun 2018-.

=== Components ===
- 26th Operations Support Flight (later 26th Operations Support Squadron, 1 November 2008 – present
- 26th Network Operations Squadron

Maxwell Air Force Base-Gunter Annex, Alabama, 18 August 2009

- 33d Network Warfare Squadron, 26 July 2007 – present

=== Stations ===
- Sembach Air Base, Germany, 1 October 1986
- Vogelweh, Germany, 1 September 1992
- Ramstein Air Base, Germany, 1 January 1995
- Lackland Air Force Base (later, Joint Base San Antonio-Lackland) Texas, 5 July 2006 – present

=== Decorations ===
- Air Force Outstanding Unit Award with Combat "V" Device
  - 1 June 2002 – 31 May 2003
  - 1 October 2010 - 30 September 2012
- Air Force Outstanding Unit Award
  - 1 July 1988 – 30 June 1990
  - 1 Oct 1993 – 30 Sep 1994
  - 1 Oct 1996 – 30 Sep 1997
  - 1 Oct 1999 – 30 Sep 2000
  - 1 June 2001 – 31 May 2002
  - 1 June 2003 – 31 May 2005
  - 1 Jun 2005-31 May 2007;
  - 1 Oct 2012-30 Sep 2013;
  - 1 Oct 2013-30 Sep 2015.

== See also ==
- List of cyber warfare forces
