= 318th Cyberspace Operations Group =

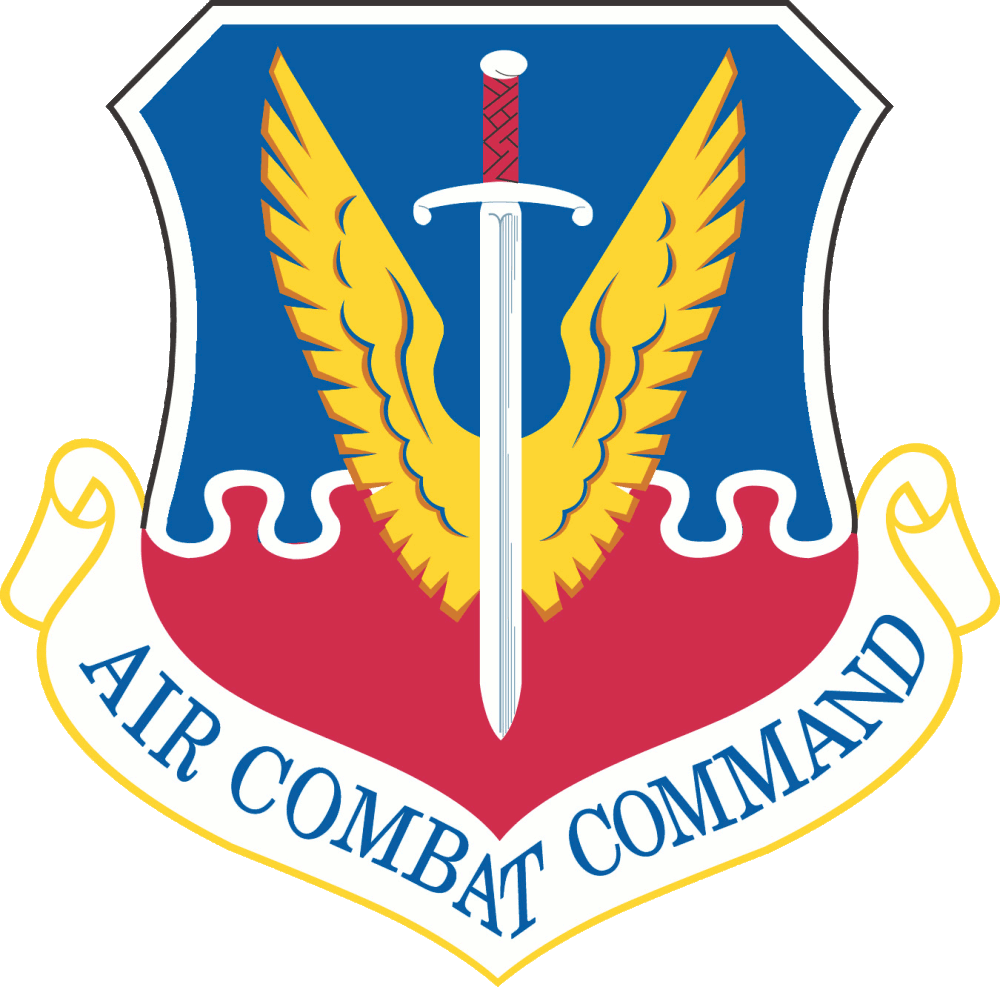
318th Cyberspace Operations Group

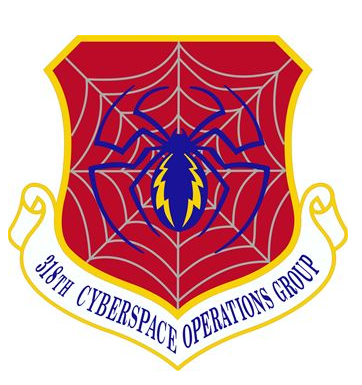
- Group emblem
- Active: 1943–1945; 2000 – present
- Country: United States
- Branch: United States Air Force
- Type: group
- Role: Information operations
- Part of: 67th Cyberspace Wing
- Base: Joint Base San Antonio-Lackland, Texas
- Engagements: China Burma India Theater
- Decorations: Air Force Organizational Excellence Award; Air Force Outstanding Unit Award

The 318th Cyberspace Operations Group is a United States Air Force information operations unit located at Joint Base San Antonio, Texas. The group was first activated during World War II as the 8th Photographic Reconnaissance Group. After training in the United States, the unit moved to the China-Burma-India Theater and engaged in hostilities until the end of the war. It returned to the United States in November 1945, and was inactivated at the port of embarkation.

The group was disbanded in 1947, but was reestablished in 1985 as the 318th Electronic Warfare Group, being renumbered to fit the Air Force's policy of numbering its operational groups and wings in a single series. It was activated in 2000 as the 318th Information Operations Group and received its current name in 2013.

== Mission ==
The mission of the 318th Group is to be an information warfare group, training and integrating advanced tactics, technologies, and tools arming America's warfighters with decisive information warfare combat power.

== Units ==
- 39th Information Operations Squadron

The squadron conducts training on cyberspace operations, including operational security and deception at both the initial and advanced level.

- 90th Cyberspace Operations Squadron

The squadron produces government of the shelf (GOTS) software in support of cyber operations.

- 318th Range Squadron

The squadron designs, builds, and provides cyber ranges for test, training, mission rehearsal, and exercise.

- 346th Test Squadron

The squadron tests, evaluates and assesses cyberspace capabilities for operational forces, national agencies, the acquisition community and Department of Defense agencies.

== History ==
=== World War II ===
The group was first activated at Peterson Field, Colorado as the 8th Photographic Reconnaissance Group on 1 October 1943, but was redesignated the 8th Photographic Group little more than a week later. Before the end of the month, group headquarters had moved to Gainesville Army Air Field, Texas. The group had no flying squadrons assigned, (Note: Maurer lists the 34th Photographic Reconnaissance Squadron as assigned in World War II Combat Squadrons of the USAF, pp. 165-66. However, neither Maurer in Combat Units of the Air Force in World War II, nor Lacomia list the 34th as assigned to the group, and the squadron was stationed at Will Rogers Field at the pertinent time, not with group headquarters at Gainesville.)and its personnel were trained to provide photographic intelligence for air and ground forces. In February 1944, the group headquarters left the United States for the China-Burma-India Theater.

Group headquarters arrived in India at the end of March 1944, and in April established itself at Bally Seaplane Base. There it was assigned operational squadrons for the first time on 25 April:

- The 9th Photographic Reconnaissance Squadron at Barrackpore Airfield, India and primarily equipped with Lockheed F-5 Lightnings
- The 20th Tactical Reconnaissance Squadron at Kisselbari, India, but operating from Dinjan Airfield, India and primarily equipped with Curtiss P-40 Warhawks
- The 24th Combat Mapping Squadron at Guskhara Airfield, India and primarily equipped with Consolidated F-7 Liberators.

Each of these squadrons maintained detachments of various sizes in India, Burma, and China and did not operate in squadron strength from a single base.

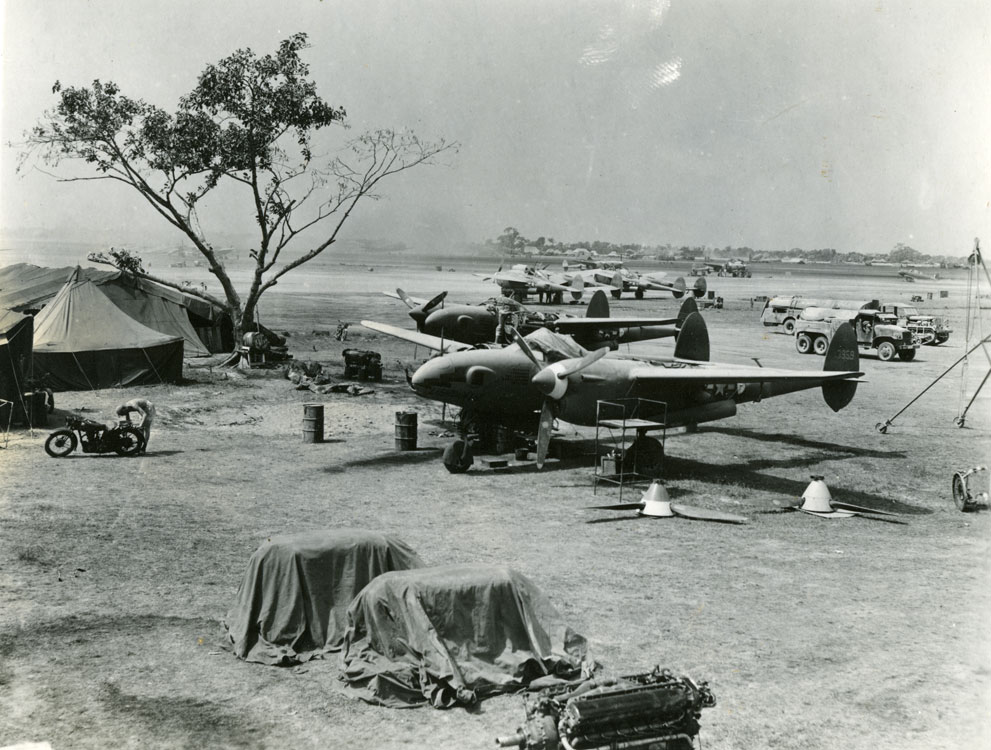
F-5 Lightnings of the 40th Photo Reconnaissance Squadron

In July 1944, the 40th Photographic Reconnaissance Squadron arrived in theater and its F-5 Lightnings were stationed at Guskhara Airfield. The group's squadrons conducted photographic reconnaissance, photographic mapping, and visual reconnaissance missions. The products the group created included maps, mosaics, terrain models, and target charts of areas in Burma, China, French Indochina and Thailand. Group aircraft conducting armed reconnaissance missions bombed and strafed enemy installations and occasionally provided fighter escort for bombers.

Shortly before the war's end, in June 1945, the group was redesignated the 8th Reconnaissance Group. It remained in India after V-J Day. Group headquarters and most elements departed in October 1945, while the 9th Squadron briefly remained behind in India. Upon arrival at Camp Kilmer, New Jersey, the port of embarkation, the group was inactivated. It was disbanded on 6 March 1947. In 1985, the group was reconstituted and redesignated the 318th Electronic Warfare Group, but was never active under that designation.

=== Cyberspace operations ===
The group was redesignated the 318th Information Operations Group and reactivated in August 2000. The unit took the lead in developing information operations techniques, tactics and procedures for use by the combat air forces and other agencies.

The group emblem was approved on 1 August 2011.

The group assumed its current designation in September 2013.

== Lineage ==
- Constituted as the 8th Photographic Reconnaissance Group on 15 September 1943

Activated on 1 October 1943

- Redesignated 8th Photographic Group, Reconnaissance on 9 October 1943
- Redesignated 8th Reconnaissance Group on 15 June 1945

inactivated on 5 November 1945

- Disbanded on 6 March 1947
- Reconstituted and redesignated 318th Electronic Warfare Group on 31 July 1985
- Redesignated 318th Information Operations Group on 17 July 2000

Activated on 1 August 2000

- Redesignated 318th Cyberspace Operations Group on 13 September 2013

=== Assignments ===
- III Reconnaissance Command, 1 October 1943
- 89th Reconnaissance Training Wing, 27 October 1943
- Tenth Air Force, c. 31 March 1944
- Army Air Forces, India-Burma Sector, China-Burma-India Theater (later Army Air Forces, India-Burma Theater), 18 July 1944
- Army Service Forces, Port of Embarkation, c. 8 October – 5 November 1945
- Air Force Information Operations Center (later 688th Information Operations Wing, 688th Cyberspace Wing), 1 August 2000 – unknown
- 67th Cyberspace Wing, 2018

=== Components ===
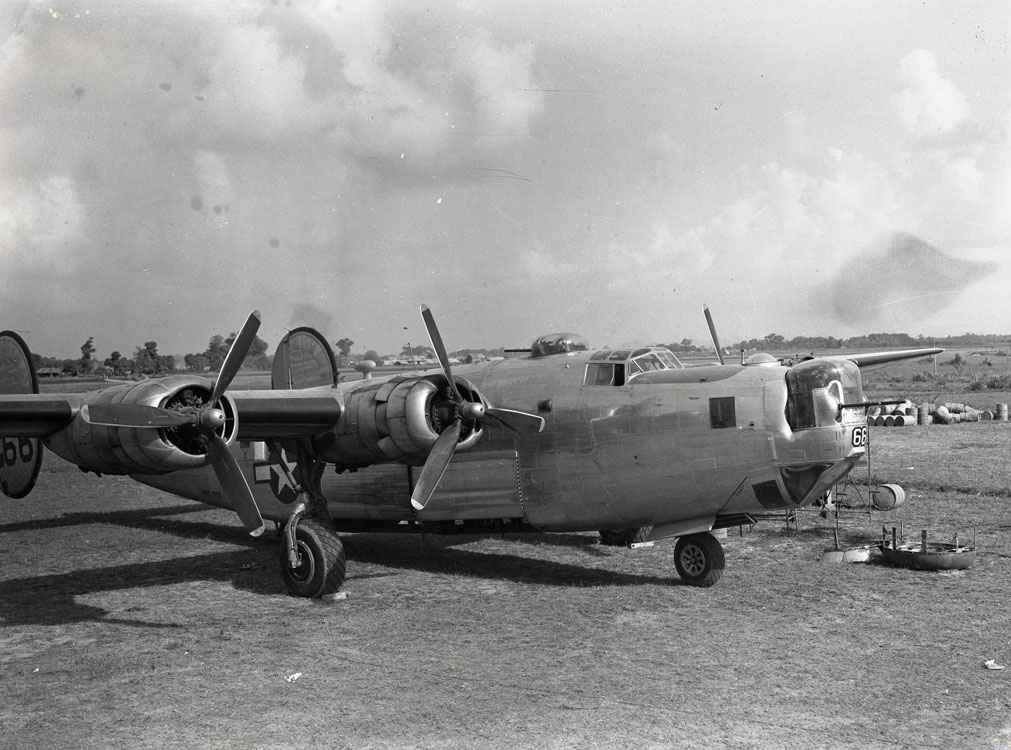
An F-7 Liberator of the group's 24th Combat Mapping Squadron in India in 1945

Squadrons

- 7th Photographic Technical Squadron: c. 1 Oct 1943 – 1944

Will Rogers Field, Oklahoma

- 9th Photographic Reconnaissance Squadron: 25 April 1944 – Oct 1945
- 20th Tactical Reconnaissance Squadron; 25 April 1944 – Oct 1945
- 23d Information Operations Squadron: 1 August 2000 – c. 7 December 2011
- 24th Combat Mapping Squadron, 25 April 1944 – September 1945
- 34th Photographic Reconnaissance Squadron: 9 October 1943 – 15 January 1944
- 39th Information Operations Squadron: 1 August 2000 – present

Hurlburt Field, Florida

- 40th Photographic Reconnaissance Squadron: 18 July 1944 – 2 Nov 1945
- 90th Information Operations Squadron (later 90th Cyberspace Operations Squadron): 18 August 2009 – present
- 92d Information Warfare Aggressor Squadron (later 92d Information Operations Squadron): 1 November 2000 – unknown
- 315th Information Operations Squadron: 16 May 2005 – 12 June 2006
- 318th Range Squadron: C. 1 October 2019 – present
- 346th Test Squadron: 1 August 2000 – present
- 453d Electronic Warfare Squadron: c. 1 August 2000 – 5 August 2009

Other

- 2d Combat Camera Unit: attached c. 18 July 1944–26 October 1944
- 3d Photographic Technical Unit: 18 July 1944 – 5 November 1945
- 10th Combat Camera Unit: c. 25 April 1944 – 5 November 1945

=== Stations ===
- Peterson Field, Colorado, 1 October 1943
- Gainesville Army Air Field, Texas, 26 October 1943 – 12 February 1944
- Worli, India, 31 March 1944
- Bally Seaplane Base, India, 15 April 1944 – 7 October 1945
- Camp Kilmer, New Jersey, 3 – 5 November 1945)
- Lackland Air Force Base (later Joint Base San Antonio), Texas, 1 August 2000 – present

=== Aircraft ===
- Lockheed F-5 Lightning (1944–1945)
- North American F-6 Mustang (1945)
- Consolidated F-7 Liberator(1944–1945)
- Curtiss P-40 Warhawk (1943–1945)

=== Awards and campaigns ===
Award streamer	Award	Dates	Notes
	Air Force Outstanding Unit Award	1 August 2000-31 May 2002	318th Information Operations Group
	Air Force Outstanding Unit Award	1 June 2006-31 May 2008	318th Information Operations Group
	Air Force Outstanding Unit Award	1 June 2008-31 May 2009	318th Information Operations Group
	Air Force Outstanding Unit Award	18 August 2009-1 October 2010	318th Information Operations Group
	Air Force Outstanding Unit Award	2 October 2010-30 September 2011	318th Information Operations Group
	Air Force Outstanding Unit Award	1 October 2013-30 September 2014	318th Cyberspace Operations Group
	Air Force Organizational Excellence Award	1 June 2003-31 May 2004	318th Cyberspace Operations Group

Campaign Streamer	Campaign	Dates	Notes
	India-Burma	31 March 1944–28 January 1945	8th Photographic Group
	China Defensive	31 Mar 1944–4 May 1945	8th Photographic Group
	Central Burma	29 January 1945–15 July 1945	8th Photographic Group (later 8th Reconnaissance Group)

== See also ==
- List of cyber warfare forces
