= 561st Network Operations Squadron =

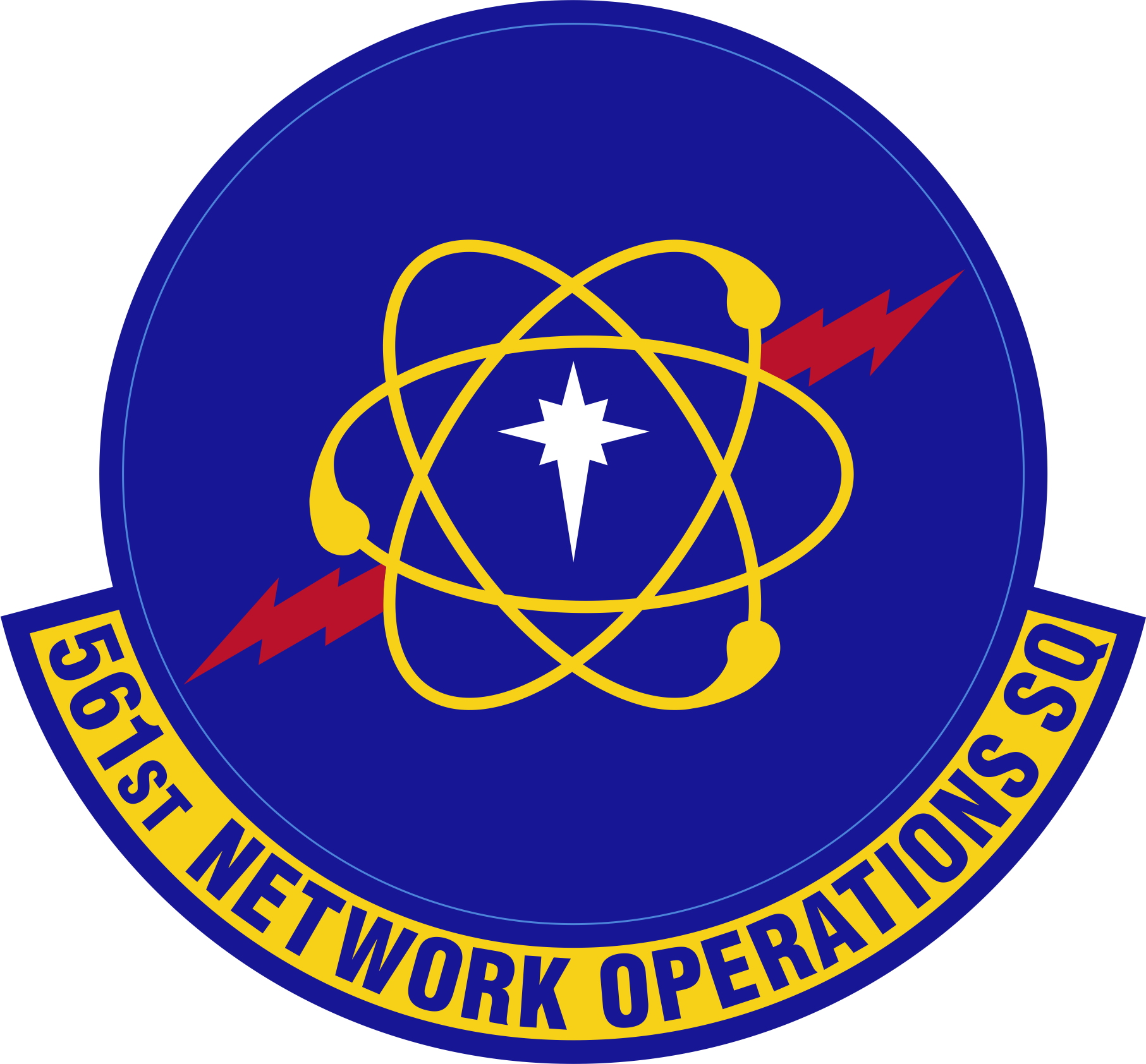
- Approved 17 May 1983; newest rendition, 17 Oct 2018.
- Active: Current
- Country: United States
- Branch: United States Air Force
- Role: Cyber Operations
- Size: Squadron
- Part of: Air Force Combat Command
- Garrison/HQ: Peterson Space Force Base
- Nicknames: AFCYBER's Workhorse, Five-Six-One, Home of the Wombat
- Mascot: Gryphons.
- Decorations: Air Force Outstanding Unit Award with Combat "V" Device for 1 Oct 2010 – 30 Sep 2012. Air Force Outstanding Unit Award for 1 Jan 1983 – 31 Dec 1984, 5 Jul 2006 – 31 May 2007, 1 Oct 2012 – 30 Sep 2013.

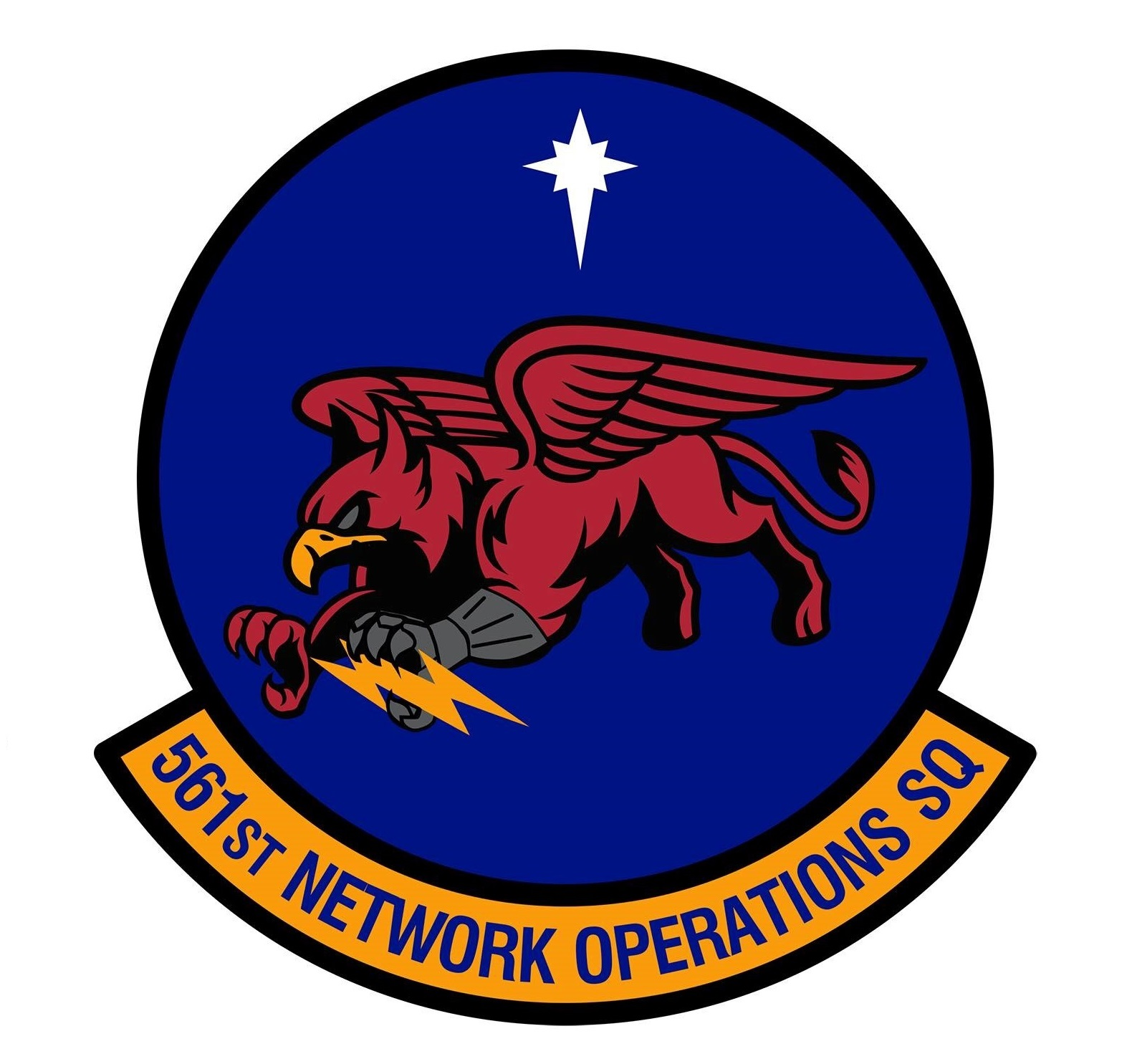
Gryphon Patch

The 561 Network Operations Squadron (NOS), AFCYBER's Workhorse Squadron, is located at Peterson Space Force Base, Colorado Springs, Colorado. It is currently under the command of the 690 Cyberspace Operations Group, which is responsible for operating and maintaining the United States Air Force's global enterprise network. The 561 NOS mission is to operate the cyberspace security and control system (CSCS) weapon system to deliver mission assurance. The 561 NOS and 690 COG report to the 688th Cyberspace Wing, which is currently under the Sixteenth Air Force. The 561 NOS was originally stood up as the 561st Communications Squadron assigned to the 67th Network Warfare Wing under Air Combat Command's 8th Air Force, before being redesignated as the 561 NOS and realigned under Air Force Space Command's 24th Air Force. It transferred back to Air Combat Command on 7 June 2018.

== Emblem ==
The emblem was originally designed for the 2161st Communication Squadron, a predecessor of the 561 NOS. Polaris, the guiding star and light, allude to Air Force Communications Command communicators who provide the medium for obtaining and providing guidance to all Air Force activities through communications systems. The star also symbolizes the NATO mission, thus, the close coordination with our Allies. The ellipses signify the elements of the atom, the basis of all electronic/electrical equipment that the 2161st Communication Squadron operated and maintained. This is the macrocosm view. In the macrocosm, the ellipses represent the earth and the global-wide communications (connectivity) which the 2161st Communications Squadron provided. The lightning bolt indicates the transmission and reception of signals by the communications equipment and is symbolic of Air Force Communications Command. The blue background indicated the United States Air Force primary theater of operations, the sky. The original emblem was approved in 1983 and was revised 17 October 2018

== Detachments ==
561 NOS has had many detachments. Currently one is active with a projected sunset of December 2020.

Detachments 1, activated on 5 Jul 2006 at Hickam Air Force Base, HI. Now the 690th Cyberspace Operations Squadron located at Joint Base Pearl Harbor–Hickam.

Detachments 2, activated on 5 Jul 2006 at Randolph Air Force Base, TX. Inactivation unknown

Detachments 3, activated on 5 Jul 2006 at Scott Air Force Base, IL. Inactivated June 2021.

Detachments 4, activated on 5 Jul 2006 at Arlington City, VA, inactivated on 31 Aug 2006. Replaced by the 83rd Network Operations Squadron

== Lineage ==
Designated as: 2161st Communications Squadron, and activated, on 1 Jul 1982.

- On 1 July 1982, the 2161st Communications Squadron was activated under Capt W.T. Lord at RAF Greenham Common. Under the Capt Lord, the 2161st supported troops responsible for the BGM-109G Gryphon Ground Launch Cruise Missile. The 2161st was eventually redesignated the 561 NOS Gryphons and Capt Lord went on to become Lt. Gen. Lord, the Air Force’s Chief Information Officer from 2009-2012.

Redesignated as: 2161st Information Systems Squadron on 1 Oct 1984

Redesignated as: 2161st Communications Squadron on 1 Nov 1986. Inactivated on 31 May 1991 at the end of the Cold War.

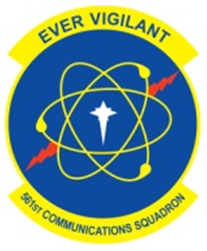
Old emblem

Redesignated as: 561st Communications Squadron on 28 Jun 2006. Activated on 5 Jul 2006.

Redesignated as: 561st Network Operations Squadron on 26 Jul 2007.

== Assignments ==
2147th Communications Group (later, 2147th Information Systems Group, 2147th Information Systems Wing, 2147th Communications Wing) 1 Jul 1982-1 Oct 1990

26th Network Operations Group 5 Jul 2006

690th Network Support (later, Cyberspace Operations) Group, 18 Aug 2009-.

== Stations ==
Royal Air Force Base, Greenham Common, United Kingdom, 1 Jul 1982 – 31 May 1991.

Peterson AFB (later, Peterson SFB), CO, 5 Jul 2006-.

== List of commanders ==
- Lt Col Lee W. Bodenhausen, 15 September 2006 - 28 July 2007
- Lt Col Roger Ouellette, July 2007 - July 2009
- Lt Col Kevin "Rowdy" Yates, July 2009 - July 2011
- Lt Col Roy V. Rockwell, February 2013 – June 2015
- Lt Col David Canady, ~2016
- Lt Col Joshua Close, 2017 - 16 July 2019
- Lt Col Joshua Diehl, 16 July 2019 – 24 June 2021
- Lt Col Alphanso R. Adams, 25 June 2021 – 6 July 2023
- Lt Col Christopher Troutman, 7 July 2023 - 6 June 2025
- Lt Col Lance J. Bramble, 7 June 2025 - Present
