= 39th Information Operations Squadron =

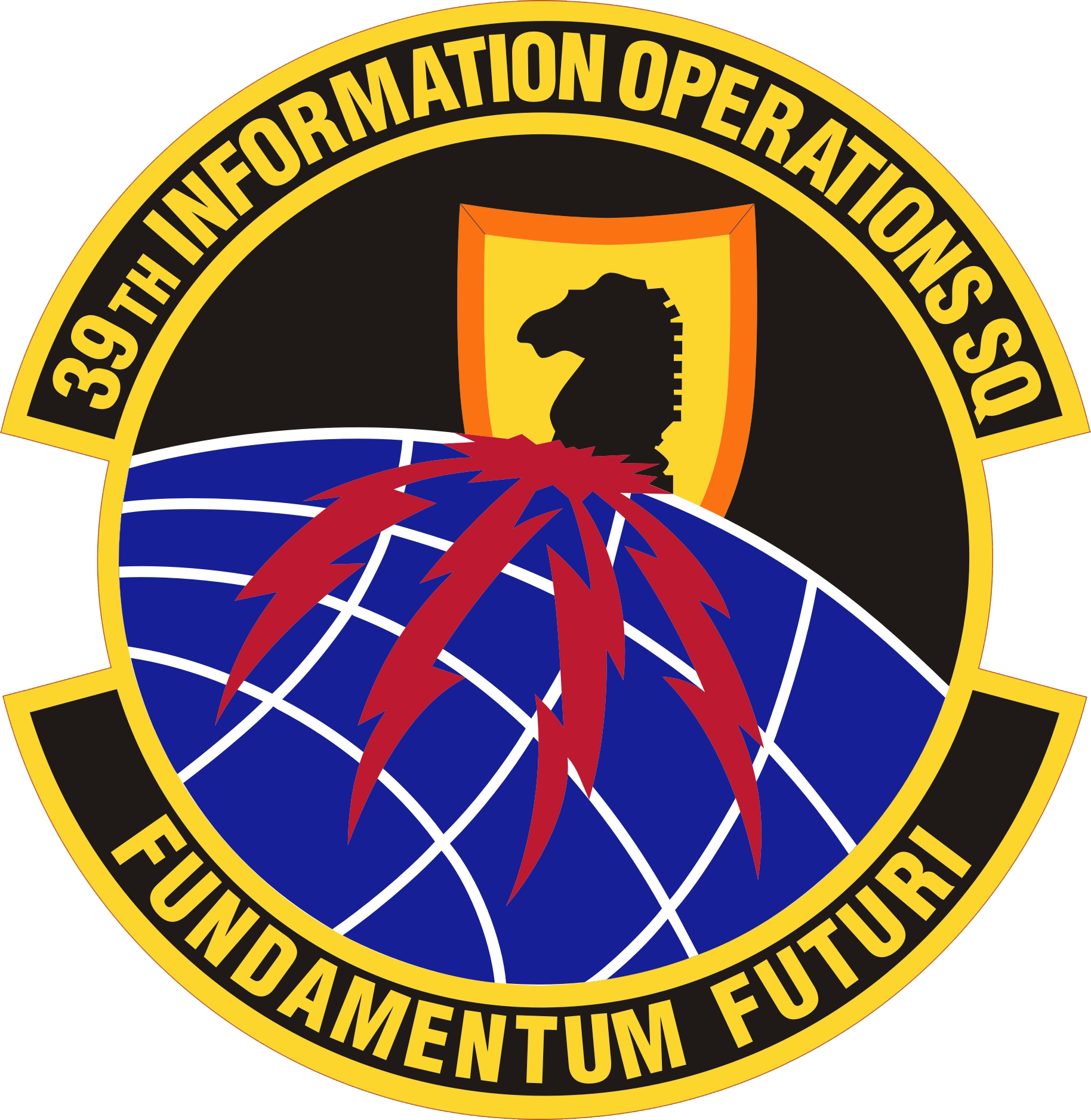
- Squadron emblem
- Active: 1942–1955; 1986–1991; 1994 – present
- Country: United States
- Branch: United States Air Force
- Type: Squadron and formal training unit
- Role: Information operations and cyberwarfare training
- Part of: 318th Cyberspace Operations Group
- Base: Hurlburt Field, Florida
- Mottos: One niner ready (1987–1988); Fundamentum futuri (Latin for 'Foundation for the future') (1988 – present)
- Decorations: Air Force Organizational Excellence Award; Air Force Outstanding Unit Award

The 39th Information Operations Squadron is an information operations and cyber Formal Training Unit, part of the 318th Cyberspace Operations Group.

The squadron is located at Hurlburt Field, Florida. Its training facility is a state of the art 22,000-square-foot (2,000 m^{2}) facility housing several classrooms, multiple small group mission planning rooms and a 60-person auditorium. All classrooms are equipped with communication and computer systems, including secure video teleconferencing and fiber optic infrastructures to allow real-time war gaming and improved instruction at multiple security levels.

== Mission ==
"Provide initial and advanced information operations and cyber training for the United States Air Force."

== History ==
The 39th Intelligence Squadron was assigned to the 67th Intelligence Group, Nellis Air Force Base, Nevada, until 1 October 1988 when it was relocated to Hurlburt Field, Florida. The squadron assumed the mission of the discontinued Detachment 1, 67th Intelligence Group and was redesignated the 39th Information Operations Squadron on 1 September 1999, to better reflect its new and expanded mission.

On 1 August 2000 the 39th was reassigned to the 318th Information Operations Group.

== Lineage ==
36th Communications Security Squadron

- Constituted as the 136th Signal Radio Intelligence Company on 7 February 1942
- Activated 15 February 1942
- Redesignated 136th Signal Radio Intelligence Company, Aviation on 4 October 1943
- Redesignated 136th Radio Security Detachment c. 24 January 1945
- Redesignated 136th Radio Security Squadron on 15 March 1949
- Redesignated 136th Communications Security Squadron on 20 January 1951
- Redesignated 36th Communications Security Squadron on 8 December 1953
- Inactivated on 8 May 1955

Consolidated with the 6919th Electronic Security Squadron as the 39th Intelligence Squadron on 1 November 1994

6919th Electronic Security Squadron

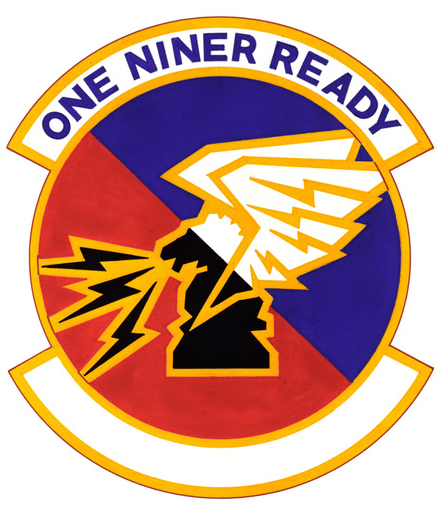
The 6919th Electronic Security Squadron emblem, approved on 15 September 1987

- Designated as the 6919th Electronic Security Squadron and activated on 1 October 1986
- Inactivated on 31 May 1991

Consolidated with the 36th Communications Security Squadron as the 39th Intelligence Squadron on 1 November 1994

39th Information Operations Squadron

- 6919th Electronic Security Squadron consolidated with the 36th Communications Security Squadron as the 39th Intelligence Squadron on 1 November 1994

Activated on 15 November 1994
Redesignated 39th Information Operations Squadron on 1 September 1999

=== Assignments ===
- Army Air Forces, 15 February 1942
- United States Air Force Security Service, 1 February 1949
- 6960th Headquarters Support Group, 1 September 1951
- United States Air Force Security Service, 12 May 1952
- Air Force Communications Security Center, 17 February 1954 – 8 May 1955
- 6910th Electronic Security Wing, 1 October 1986
- 691st Electronic Security Wing, 15 July 1988 – 31 May 1991
- 67th Intelligence Group, 15 November 1994
- Air Force Information Warfare Center, 1 October 1998
- 318th Information Operations Group, 1 August 2000 – present

=== Stations ===
- Bolling Field, District of Columbia, 15 February 1942
- Fort George G. Meade, Maryland, 1 June 1943
- Reading Army Air Field, Pennsylvania, 15 November 1944
- Mitchel Field, New York, 12 November 1945
- Fort Slocum, New York, 21 November 1947
- Brooks Air Force Base, Texas, 3 April 1949
- Kelly Air Force Base, Texas, 1 August 1953 – 8 May 1955
- Sembach Air Base, Germany, 1 October 1986 – 31 May 1991
- Nellis Air Force Base, Nevada, 15 November 1994
- Hurlburt Field, Florida, 1 October 1998 – present

== Courses ==
The 39th teaches six in-residence courses. The Network Warfare Bridge Course as well as the Cyber Warfare Operations Course; the Information Operations Integration Course, which is required training for airmen assigned to information operations team billets; the Air Force OPSEC Course, which teaches operations security to wing level officers and NCOs; and the Operational Military Deception Course, aimed at operational level planners. The Instructor Methodology Course, which prepares practitioners how to be instructors, and Instructional Systems Design Course, which teaches instructors how to build curriculum.

The 39th also provides initial qualification training for Air Force cyber weapon systems. The Network Warfare Bridge Course (NWBC) provides foundational network warfare skills to the full range of cyber-related Air Force specialties and prepares non-accession Airmen for initial qualification training. Upon completion of NWBC, graduates will join cyber specialty graduates from technical training to become initially qualified on a range of Air Force cyber operations crew positions.

The squadron also offers two faculty development courses. The Instructor Methodology Course (IMC) is a 10-day course awarding 4 semester hours of collegiate credit and provides training to potential formal classroom/lab instructors. Additionally, the Instructional Systems Design (ISD) course merges the AETC ISD and Objectives and Tests course. It is an intensive 10-day group activity course that awards 3 semester hours of collegiate credit and satisfies the 3-semester hour requirement for the CCAF ISD Certification.

=== Network Warfare Bridge Course ===
The predecessor to the Undergraduate Network Warfare Training (UNWT) the new course also known as NWBC was stood up. This course is to train airmen to become Network Warfare Operations Specialists who actively defend a wide variety of vital Air Force networks. Students are educated in network warfare concepts and operational functions.

=== Information Operations Integration Course ===
Also known as IOIC, this course trains students in basics of IO, Air Force and Joint doctrine, concepts of operations, executing organizations, and operational functions of the USAF. Students will receive an initial familiarization of operations within the Air & Space Operations Center, focused on effects-based operations, and the importance of IO integration within operations planning.

=== Air Force OPSEC Course ===
Also known as AFOC, this course trains wing-level signature managers in operations security concepts to counter potential observation of force activities. Initial training for wing-level OPSEC Officers and NCOs. This course is focused on operations security concepts to assess installation processes in order to provide commanders with viable options in regards to protection or exploitation of installation signatures.

=== Operational Military Deception ===
Also known as OMD, this course trains airmen in Military Deception planning to develop military deception plans as a part of campaign/wartime operations. Most planners serve at MAJCOMs or NAFs. Training for MAJCOM/NAF operational Military Deception Planners in an Air & Space Operations Center environment.

=== Instructor Methodology Course ===
Also known as IMC, this course trains enlisted, officer, and civilian instructors on instructional methodology as well as basic Instructional Systems Development (ISD).

=== Instructional Systems Design Course ===
This course builds off the fundamentals taught in the Instructor Methods Course. Students work in an interactive group environment to work through the "ADDIE" (Analysis, Design, Development, Implementation, and Evaluation) phases of the ISD model.

== See also ==
- Hurlburt Field
- 67th Cyberspace Wing
- Sixteenth Air Force
- Air Combat Command
- List of cyber warfare forces
