= 26th Network Operations Squadron =

- Active: 2009 – present
- Country: United States
- Branch: United States Air Force
- Type: Network Operations
- Role: Cyberspace Defense
- Part of: ACC/16 AF/688 CW
- Garrison/HQ: Gunter Annex, Alabama
- Nickname: "The Sentinels"
- Mottos: Always On, Always Ready

Commanders
- Current commander: Lieutenant Colonel Cornita McQuitery

The 26th Network Operations Squadron (26 NOS), United States Air Force, is a network operations unit located at Gunter Annex, in Montgomery, AL.

== History ==
The squadron was established as the 1987th Communications Squadron on 1 June 1966, at Nakhon Phanom Royal Thai Air Force Base, Thailand, before moving to Lowry Air Force Base, Colorado on 31 October 1975. It came under the Lowry Technical Training Center of Air Training Command on 1 October 1990. It was redesignated as the 3415th Communications Squadron on 1 April 1991. That unit was inactivated on 28 June 1994.

On 11 August 2009, the 3415th Communication Squadron was redesignated as the 26th Network Operations Squadron. The squadron was activated on 18 Aug. 2009, on the day of the implementation of the Twenty-Fourth Air Force. This unit, as one of the newest squadrons in the U.S. Air Force, carries out cyberspace operations.

From 2009, the squadron has operated the U.S. Air Force portion of the Global Information Grid and provides computer network defense for the Air Force enterprise network. In addition to operating and defending the Air Force Enterprise Network Increment 1 (AFNET INC 1) Gateways, the squadron provides command and control and computer defense for more than 250 locations, with more than 1,100 wide area network circuits supporting warfighting efforts while executing 24/7 sustainment of all Air Force active duty, Air Force Reserve, and Air National Guard Non-Secure Internet Protocol Router/ Secure Internet Protocol Router services.

== Lineage ==
Designated as 1987 Communications Squadron, and organized, on 1 Jun 1966. Redesignated as: 1987 Information Systems Squadron on 1 Jan 1986; 1987 Communications Squadron on 1 Nov 1986; 3415 Communications Squadron on 1 Apr 1991. Inactivated on 28 Jun 1994. Redesignated as 26 Network Operations Squadron on 11 Aug 2009. Activated on 18 Aug 2009.

=== Assignments ===
1974 Communications Group, 1 Jun 1966; Northern Communications Area (later, Continental Communications Division), 31 Oct 1975; Air Training Information Systems (later, Air Training Communications) Division, 1 Jan 1986; Lowry Technical Training Center, 1 Oct 1990; 3415 Support Group, 1 Feb 1992 – 28 Jun 1994. 26 Network Operations Group, 18 Aug 2009-.

=== Stations ===
- Nakhon Phanom RTAFB, Thailand, 1 June 1966
- Lowry AFB, Colorado, 31 October 1975 – 28 June 1994
- Gunter Annex, Alabama, 18 August 2009

=== Awards and campaigns ===
Presidential Unit Citation (Southeast Asia), 1 Nov 1968 – 1 May 1969. Air Force Outstanding Unit Awards with Combat "V" Device: 22 Oct 1968 – 30 Jun 1970; 1 Jul 1969-30 Jun 1970; 1 Jul 1970 – 30 Jun 1971; 1 Jul 1971-30 Jun 1972; 1 Jul 1972 – 30 Jun 1973. Air Force Outstanding Unit Awards: 1-30 Jun 1966; 1 Jul 1967 – 30 Jun 1968; 1 Jul 1968-30 Jun 1969; 1 Jan 1976 – 31 Dec 1977; 1 Jul 1988-30 Jun 1990. Air Force Organizational Excellence Awards: 1 Oct 1988 – 30 Sep 1989; 1 Oct 1992-28 Jun 1994. Republic of Vietnam Gallantry Cross with Palm: 1 June 1966 – 28 January 1973.

== See also ==
- List of cyber warfare forces
