= 690th Cyberspace Operations Group =

690th Cyberspace Operations Group
- Active: 1991–present
- Country: United States
- Branch: United States Air Force
- Role: Cyber Operations
- Size: Group
- Part of: Air Combat Command
- Garrison/HQ: Lackland Air Force Base
- Decorations: Air Force Outstanding Unit Award with Combat "V" Device; Air Force Organizational Excellence Award

Insignia
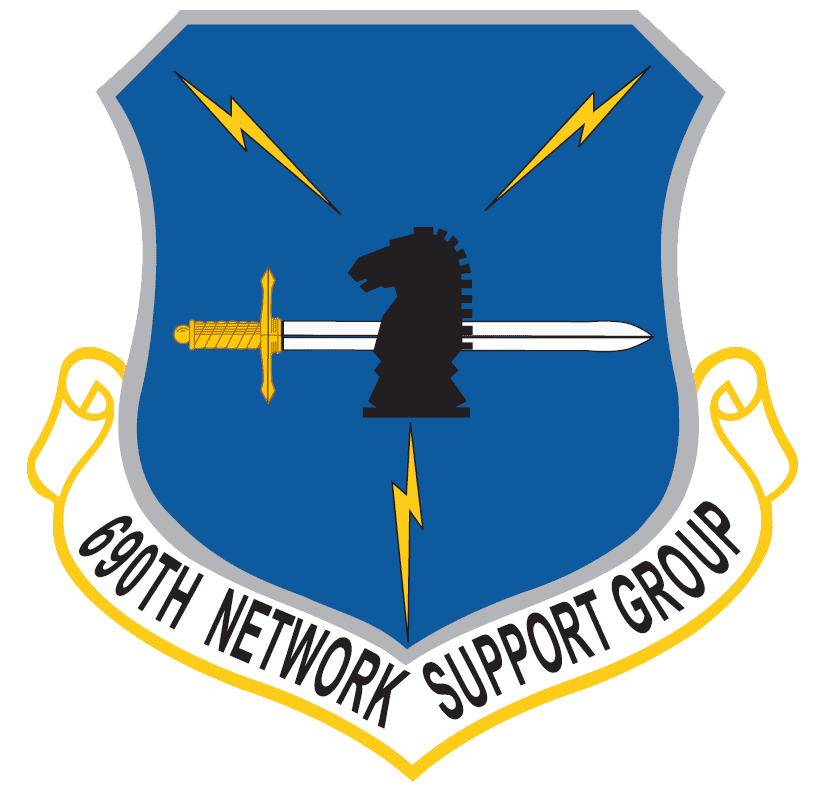
- 690th Network Support Group emblem (Note: Approved 29 March 1995.)

The 690th Cyberspace Operations Group, at Lackland Air Force Base, Texas, is a United States Air Force group operating the Cyber Security and Control System weapon system. The group was established 1 April 1991 as the 6900th Communications-Computer Group. The group was redesignated the Air Intelligence Agency Intelligence Systems Group on 1 October 1993. It was redesignated again as the 690th Information Operations Group on 1 Oct 1997. On 5 July 2006, the group was again redesignated as the 690th Network Support Group.

The group is responsible for operating and maintaining the Air Force's global enterprise network. 690th was reassigned to the 688th Cyberspace Wing in 2018.

== Mission ==
Operate, sustain and defend the Air Force information network by employing the Cyberspace Security and Control System weapon system to assure global cyber supremacy, enforce network standards and develop Airmen as cyber warriors.

== Lineage ==
- Established 1 April 1991 as the 6900th Communications-Computer Group

Activated 1 April 1991

- Redesignated Air Intelligence Agency Intelligence Systems Group on 1 October 1993
- Redesignated 690th Information Operations Group on 1 October 1997
- Redesignated 690th Network Support Group on 5 July 2006
- Redesignated 690th Cyberspace Operations Group on 1 October 2013

=== Components ===
- 83rd Network Operations Squadron, August 2009 – present

Langley Air Force Base, Virginia

- 561st Network Operations Squadron ("Gryphons"), August 2009 – present

Peterson Air Force Base, Colorado

- 690th Computer Systems Squadron (later 690th Network Support Squadron), (Note: Components stationed with group headquarters except as noted.) 1 October 1997 – present
- 690th Information Operations Squadron, 1 October 1997 – 1 August 2000
- 690th Intelligence Support Squadron, 1 October 1997 – present
- 690th Cyberspace Operations Squadron, 8 January 2015 – present

Hickam Air Force Base, Hawaii

- 691st Cyberspace Operations Squadron, 4 March 2016 – present

Ramstein Air Base, Germany

- 692nd Cyberspace Operations Squadron, 2 April 2022 - present

Eglin Air Force Base, Florida

=== Assignments ===
- Electronic Security Command (later Air Force Intelligence Command, Air Intelligence Agency), 1 April 1991
- Eighth Air Force, 1 February 2001
- 67th Information Operations Wing (later 67th Network Warfare Wing, 67th Cyberspace Wing), 5 November 2001
- 688th Cyberspace Wing, 30 June 2018 – present

=== Stations ===
- Kelly Air Force Base (later Kelly Annex, Joint Base San Antonio-Lackland), 1 February 2001 – present

== See also ==
- List of cyber warfare forces
