= 33rd Cyberspace Operations Squadron =

33d Cyberspace Operations Squadron
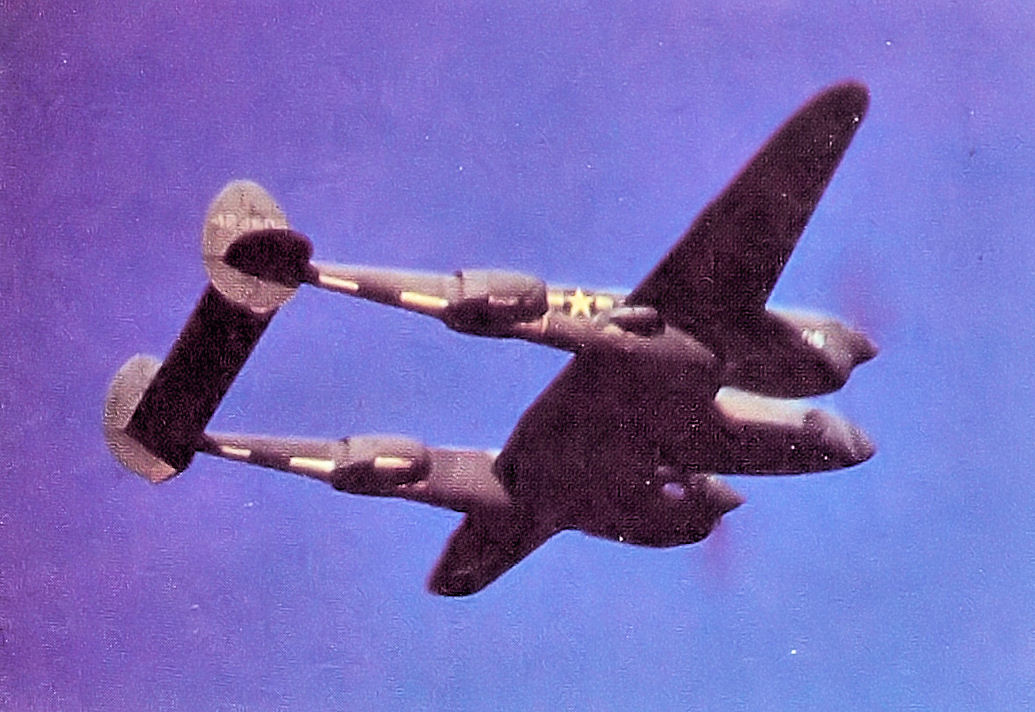
- 31st Photographic Reconnaissance Squadron Lockheed F-5E Lightning "Sexy Sall" over Saint-Dizier Airfield.
- Active: 1943-1945; 1947-1949; 1985-1996; 2000-present
- Country: United States
- Branch: United States Air Force
- Role: Computer Network Defense
- Part of: Air Combat Command
- Garrison/HQ: Lackland Air Force Base, Texas
- Nickname(s): The Mighty Griffins
- Motto(s): Command's Best
- Engagements: European Theater of Operations
- Decorations: Distinguished Unit Citation; Air Force Outstanding Unit Award with "V" Device; Air Force Meritorious Unit Award; Air force outstanding Unit Award

Insignia
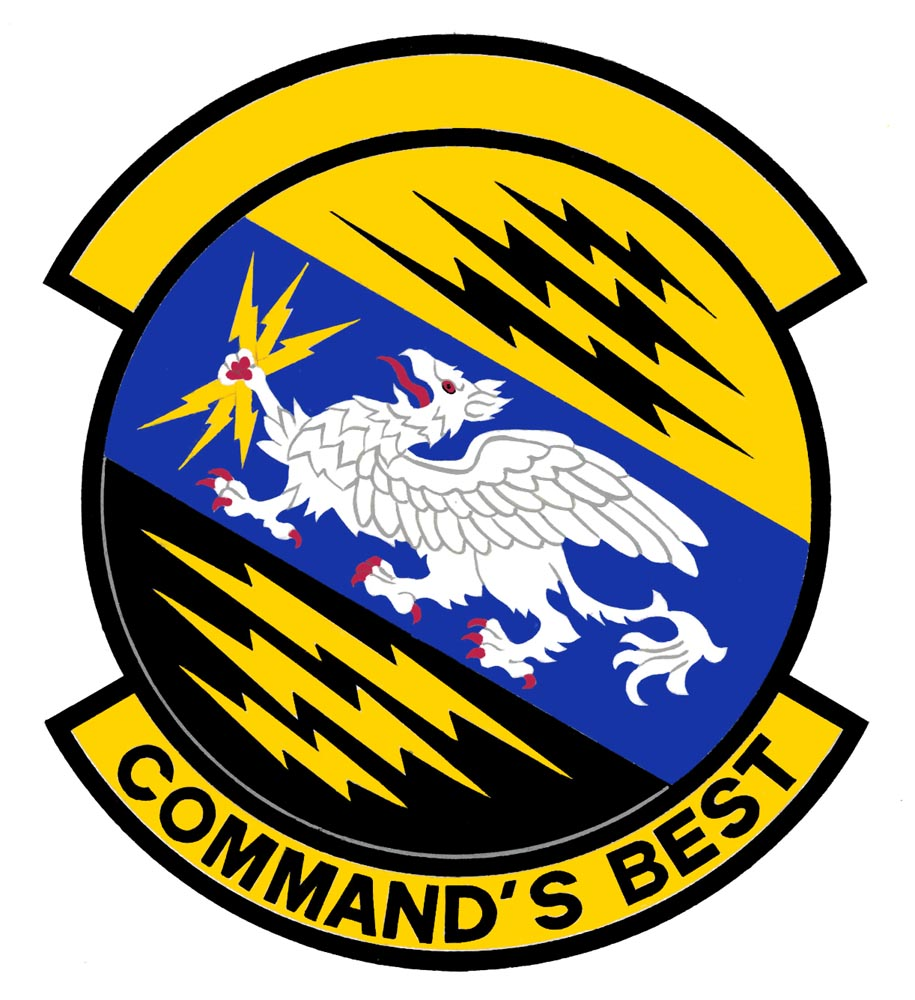
- 33rd Cyberspace Operations Squadron emblem (Note: Approved 14 October 1988.)

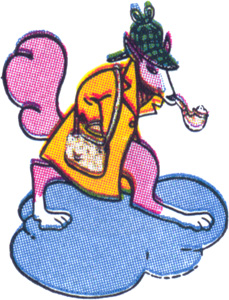
- 31st Photographic Recconnaissance Squadron emblem (Note: Approved 30 May 1944.)
- Ninth Air Force fuselage code: BV

The United States Air Force (USAF)'s 33rd Cyberspace Operations Squadron is a network warfare unit located at Lackland Air Force Base, Texas.

The squadron was established as the 70th Reconnaissance Squadron during World War II and saw combat in the European Theater of Operations as the 31st Photographic Reconnaissance Squadron, where it earned a Distinguished Unit Citation for its efforts in preparing for the Normandy Invasion. After briefly serving as part of the occupation forces in Germany it was inactivated in late 1945.

The squadron was activated again in the reserves as the 31st Reconnaissance Squadron in 1947. It was redesignated the 33d Reconnaissance Squadron (apparently to avoid confusion with the regular USAF 31st Reconnaissance Squadron). The squadron never reached full strength or received aircraft before inactivation when Continental Air Command reorganized its reserve units under the wing base organization plan.

In 1985 Electronic Security Command established the 6933d Electronic Security Squadron in Panama. The squadron participated in Operation Just Cause. In 1993, as the United States Air Force (USAF) eliminated Major Command controlled (MAJCON) four digit organizations, the 6933d was consolidated with the 33rd as a single unit, the 33rd Intelligence Squadron. The squadron was inactivated as the USAF departed Panama, but was activated once again as an information operations and network warfare unit.

== Mission ==
The 33rd's mission, as the USAF's lone network warfare squadron dedicated to Air Force network defense, is to execute all aspects of AF network defense as an element of the distributed AF Network Operations Center. The squadron monitors, secures, and protects Air Force and Central Command global networks, ensures network integrity, reliability, availability, and confidentiality and responds to hostile network threats and attacks.

== History ==
=== World War II ===
The squadron was established in mid-1943 as the 70th Reconnaissance Squadron, a tactical reconnaissance squadron. Shortly afterwards, the squadron converted to a photographic reconnaissance unit and was redesignated the 31st Photographic Reconnaissance Squadron. It trained in the southeast United States as an element of the Third Air Force.

The squadron deployed to the European Theater of Operations in the spring of 1944. It was initially engaged in aerial photography of the French English Channel coastline and Low Countries. The squadron flew Lockheed F-4 and F-5 Lightnings, and North American F-6 Mustang reconnaissance aircraft supporting Allied buildup for the Normandy Invasion. It furnished vitally important photographs of the beaches and defenses on the Continent for briefing and training of assault troops. The unit's low-level missions under difficult weather and combat conditions led to the awarding of the Distinguished Unit Citation for the period of 6 through 20 May 1944. After D-Day, the squadron moved to France and performed battlefield tactical reconnaissance primarily for the Third Army, but also for First and Ninth Armies during the Northern France Campaign in 1944. The squadron moved into Germany in the spring of 1945 continuing to supply battlefield reconnaissance for Army ground forces.

After the German surrender the 31st remained as part of the United States Air Forces in Europe occupation forces, gradually drawing down during the fall of 1945 until inactivated.

=== Air Force reserve ===
The squadron was activated again in the reserves as the 31st Reconnaissance Squadron in 1947. It was redesignated the 33d Reconnaissance Squadron (apparently to avoid confusion with the regular USAF 31st Reconnaissance Squadron). The squadron never reached full strength or received aircraft before inactivation when Continental Air Command reorganized its reserve units under the wing base organization plan.

=== Intelligence activities ===
The 6933d Electronic Security Squadron was activated by Electronic Security Command in Panama at Howard Air Force Base on 1 October 1985. Starting in December 1989 and continuing into the end of the operation in 1990 the squadron conducted signals intelligence and other intelligence missions and supported Operation Just Cause in 1989–1990. By 1993 the USAF was eliminating its Major Command controlled (MAJCON) (four digit) units. To preserve the heritage of the 6933d, the squadron was consolidated with the 33d Reconnaissance Squadron as the 33rd Intelligence Squadron. It continued to provide intelligence support in Panama until inactivating on 30 June 1996.

The squadron was again activated on 1 August 2000 as the 33rd Information Operations Squadron at Kelly Air Force Base, Texas. It conducted information operations and after 5 July 2005, network defense operations. It was redesignated the 33rd Network Warfare Squadron in July 2007 and the 33rd Cyberspace Operations Squadron in 2022.

== Lineage ==
33rd Reconnaissance Squadron

- Constituted as the 70th Reconnaissance Squadron (Fighter) on 15 June 1943

Activated on 20 June 1943.
Redesignated 31st Photographic Reconnaissance Squadron on 11 August 1943
Inactivated on 22 Nov 1945

- Redesignated 31st Reconnaissance Squadron (Night Photographic) on 5 September 1947

Activated in the reserve on 13 November 1947
Redesignated 33rd Reconnaissance Squadron (Night Photographic) on 25 November 1947
Inactivated on 27 June 1949

- Consolidated on 1 October 1993 with the 6933rd Electronic Security Squadron as the 33rd Intelligence Squadron

33rd Cyberspace Operations Squadron

- Designated as the 6933rd Electronic Security Squadron and activated on 1 October 1985
- Consolidated on 1 October 1993 with the 33rd Reconnaissance Squadron as the 33d Intelligence Squadron

Inactivated 30 June 1996

- Redesignated 33rd Information Operations Squadron

Activated on 1 August 2000
Redesignated 33rd Network Warfare Squadron on 26 July 2007
Redesignated 33rd Cyberspace Operations Squadron on 6 July 2022

=== Assignments ===
- 76th Reconnaissance Group, 20 June 1943
- III Reconnaissance Command, 11 August 1943
- 10th Photographic Group (later 10th Reconnaissance Group), 31 March 1944 - 22 November 1945
- 74th Reconnaissance Group, 13 November 1947 - 27 June 1949
- 6940th Electronic Security Wing, 1 October 1985
- Continental Electronic Security Division, 1 April 1987
- 694th Electronic Security Wing, 1 July 1988
- Continental Electronic Security Division, 1 Jan 1981
- 693d Intelligence Wing, 1 October 1991
- 67th Intelligence Group, 1 October 1993 - 30 June 1996
- 67th Information Operations Group (later 67th Network Warfare Group), 1 August 2000
- 26th Network Operations Group (later 26th Cyberspace Operations Group), 26 July 2007 – present

=== Stations ===
- Morris Field, North Carolina, 20 June 1943
- Will Rogers Field, Oklahoma, 29 October 1943 - 11 February 1944
- RAF Chalgrove (AAF-465), England, 23 March 1944
- Rennes-St-Jacques Airfield (A-27), France, 18 August 1944
- Châteaudun Airfield (A-39), France, 27 August 1944
- Saint-Dizier Airfield (A-64), France, 12 September 1944
- Conflans-en-Jarnisy Airfield (A-94), France, 29 November 1944
- Trier/Euren Airfield (Y-57), 28 March 1945
- Ober Olm Airfield (Y-64), Germany, 5 April 1945
- Fürth Airfield (later AAF Station Fürth) (R-28), Germany, 30 April 1945 - 22 November 1945
- Mitchel Field (later Mitchel Air Force Base), New York, 13 November 1947 - 27 June 1949
- Howard Air Base, Panama, 1 October 1985 - 30 June 1996
- Kelly Air Force Base (Later Lackland Air Force Base - Kelly Annex, Joint Base San Antonio), Texas, 1 August 2000 – present

=== Aircraft ===
- Lockheed F-5 Lightning, 1943–1945
- Lockheed F-4 Lightning, 1943–1944
- North American F-6 Mustang, 1945

=== Awards and Campaigns ===
Award streamer	Award	Dates	Notes
	Distinguished Unit Citation	6 May 1944 - 20 May 1944	France 31st Photographic Reconnaissance Squadron
	Air Force Outstanding Unit Award with "V" Device	1 June 2002 - 30 May 2003	33rd Information Operations Squadron
	Air Force Outstanding Unit Award with "V" Device	1 October 2010 – 30 September 2012	33rd Network Warfare Squadron
	Air Force Meritorious Unit Award	17 July 2018 – 31 May 2019	33rd Network Warfare Squadron
	Air Force Outstanding Unit Award	1 July 1986 - 30 June 1988	6933rd Electronic Security Squadron
	Air Force Outstanding Unit Award	20 December 1989 - 14 February 1991	6933rd Electronic Security Squadron
	Air Force Outstanding Unit Award	15 February 1991 - 31 December 1991	6933rd Electronic Security Squadron
	Air Force Outstanding Unit Award	1 October 1993 - 30 September 1994	33rd Intelligence Squadron
	Air Force Outstanding Unit Award	1 October 1994 - 30 September 1995	33rd Intelligence Squadron
	Air Force Outstanding Unit Award	1 August 2000 - 30 September 2000	33rd Information Operations Squadron
	Air Force Outstanding Unit Award	1 June 2003 - 31 May 2005	33rd Information Operations Squadron
	Air Force Outstanding Unit Award	1 June 2001 – 31 May 2002	33rd Information Operations Squadron
	Air Force Outstanding Unit Award	1 June 2005-31 May 2007	33rd Information Operations Squadron
	Air Force Outstanding Unit Award	1 October 2012-30 September 2013	33rd Network Warfare Squadron
	Air Force Outstanding Unit Award	1 October 2013-30 September 2015	33rd Network Warfare Squadron
	Air Force Outstanding Unit Award	1 October 2015-30 September 2016	33rd Network Warfare Squadron
	Air Force Outstanding Unit Award	1 June 2019 – 31 May 2020	33rd Network Warfare Squadron
	Air Force Outstanding Unit Award	1 June 2020 – 31 May 2021	33rd Network Warfare Squadron

Campaign Streamer	Campaign	Dates	Notes
	Air Offensive, Europe	23 March 1944 – 5 June 1944	31st Photographic Reconnaissance Squadron
	Normandy	6 June 1944 – 24 July 1944	31st Photographic Reconnaissance Squadron
	Northern France	25 July 1944 – 14 September 1944	31st Photographic Reconnaissance Squadron
	Rhineland	15 September 1944 – 21 March 1945	31st Photographic Reconnaissance Squadron
	Ardennes-Alsace	16 December 1944 – 25 January 1945	31st Photographic Reconnaissance Squadron
	Central Europe	23 March 1944 – 21 May 1945	31st Photographic Reconnaissance Squadron
	Air Combat, EAME Theater	23 March 1944 – 11 May 1945	31st Photographic Reconnaissance Squadron
	Global War on Terror Service Medal	11 September 2001–	33rd Information Operations Squadron (later 33rd Network Warfare Squadron)

== See also ==
- List of cyber warfare forces
