= Illicit activities of North Korea =

The alleged illicit activities of the North Korean state include manufacture and sale of illegal drugs, the manufacture and sale of counterfeit consumer goods, human trafficking, arms trafficking, wildlife trafficking, counterfeiting currency (especially the United States dollar and Chinese yuan), terrorism, and other areas. It is alleged many of these activities are undertaken at the direction and under the control of the North Korean government and the ruling Workers' Party of Korea, with their proceeds going towards advancing the country's nuclear and conventional arms production, funding the lifestyles of the country's elite, and propping up the North Korean economy.

== Overview ==
Unlike criminal syndicates, the extensive nature of these illegal endeavors, and the claim that they are directed and sanctioned by the highest levels of government, has led to the nature of the North Korean state being defined as a form of "criminal sovereignty" by Paul Rexton Kan and Bruce Bechtol.

However, there are questions remaining about the level of government involvement in each of the criminal enterprises. Many commentators agree that the North Korean state has been behind counterfeiting currency, human trafficking, the arms trade, etc., but the level to which it has been involved in the drug trade after the collapse of the Public Distribution System in the 1990s is not clear as semi-private and private black markets have arisen since then and some high-ranking officials may only be engaged in illicit trade for personal benefit.

The British academic Hazel Smith has argued that the allegations have a weak foundation, being largely based on the claims of a few US officials and North Korean defectors. She has pointed out that there have been very few criminal convictions. She has queried the assumption that all the activities are directed by North Korea's government.

According to North Korea scholar Andrei Lankov, the country's illicit activities never developed into lucrative hard currency earners. Instead, these activities exposed the country to international condemnation in exchange for marginal gain. Lankov suggests that smuggling was never intended to earn currency for the regime, but was simply a means of survival for diplomats whose funding was cut.

== Room 39 ==
Room 39 (or Office 39) is the primary government organization that seeks ways to maintain the foreign currency slush fund of North Korea's leader. Room 39 oversees many of the government's illegal activities (although the military also has its own illegal activity division) such as counterfeiting and drug production. In 2010, the department was reported to have had 17 overseas branches, 100 trading companies and banks under its control. By 2009, the office allegedly had upwards of $5 billion in assets, much of which was spread in banks throughout Macau, Hong Kong, and Europe.

In August 2014, Yun Tae-hyong, a senior representative of North Korea's Korea Daesong Bank, which is suspected of being under control of Room 39, was reported to have defected to Russia taking $5 million with him.

In 2015, the European Union placed the Korean National Insurance Company (KNIC) under sanctions and added that the KNIC had links to Room 39. The KNIC (which had offices in Hamburg, Germany and London, United Kingdom) was reported to have had assets of UK£787 million in 2014 and had been involved in scamming insurance markets and making investments in property and foreign exchange.

== Zainichi Koreans in Japan ==
The Japanese government accused the General Association of Korean Residents in Japan of conducting illicit trade and espionage on its soil to raise funds back to North Korea.

== Evading sanctions ==
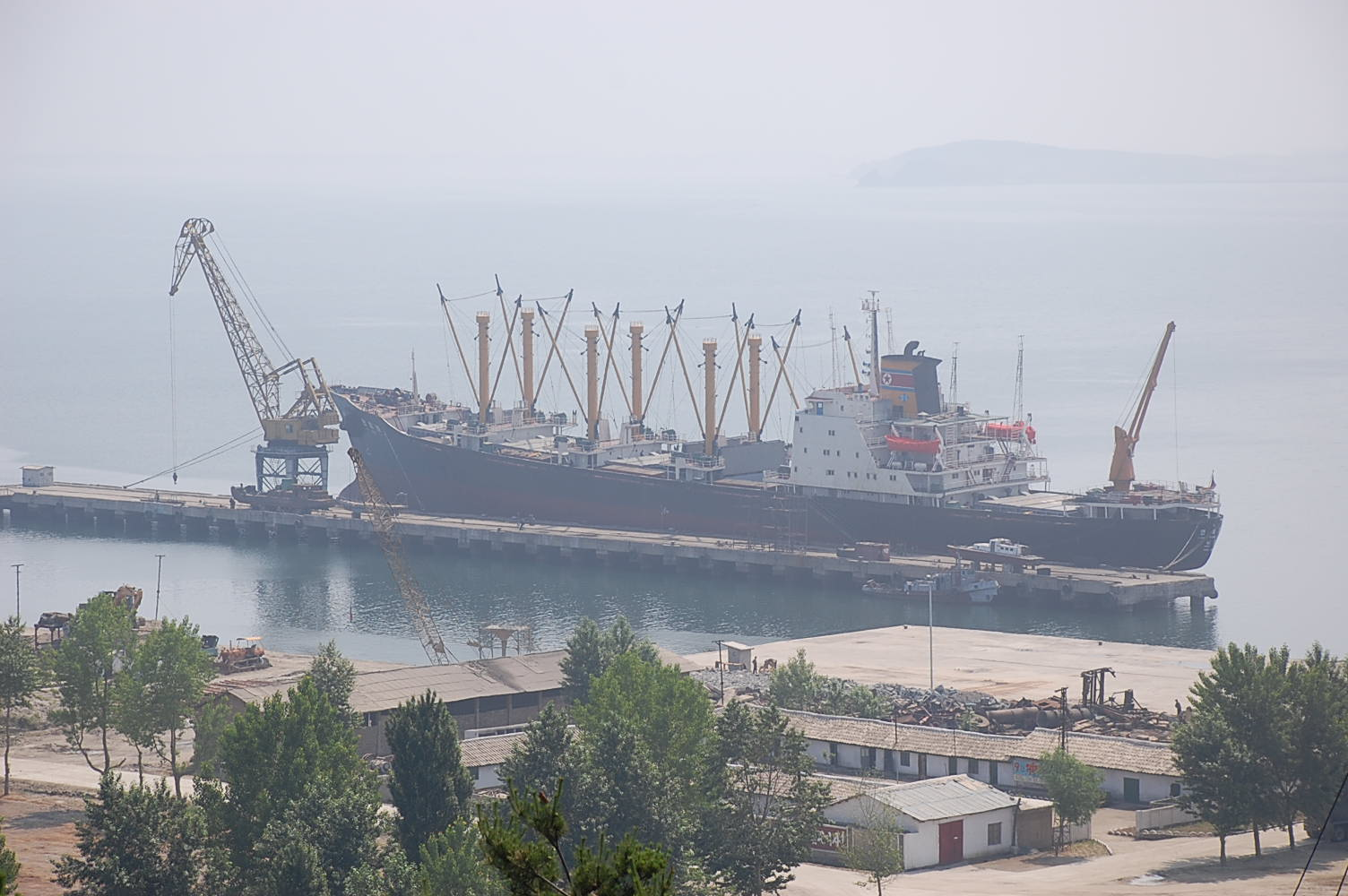
A North Korean cargo ship at the dock in Nampo

According to the United Nations Panel of Experts in April 2019, North Korea had developed a number of techniques and a complex web of organisations to enable it to evade the sanctions against it, particularly with regard to coal and oil. The techniques included falsification of documents and covert ship-to-ship transfers of cargo at sea.

In May 2019, the United States announced it had seized a North Korean cargo vessel for carrying a coal shipment in defiance of sanctions. The Justice Department said the 17,061-tonne Wise Honest is one of the North's largest cargo ships and it was first detained by Indonesia in April 2018 but is now in the possession of the United States.

== Hacking ==
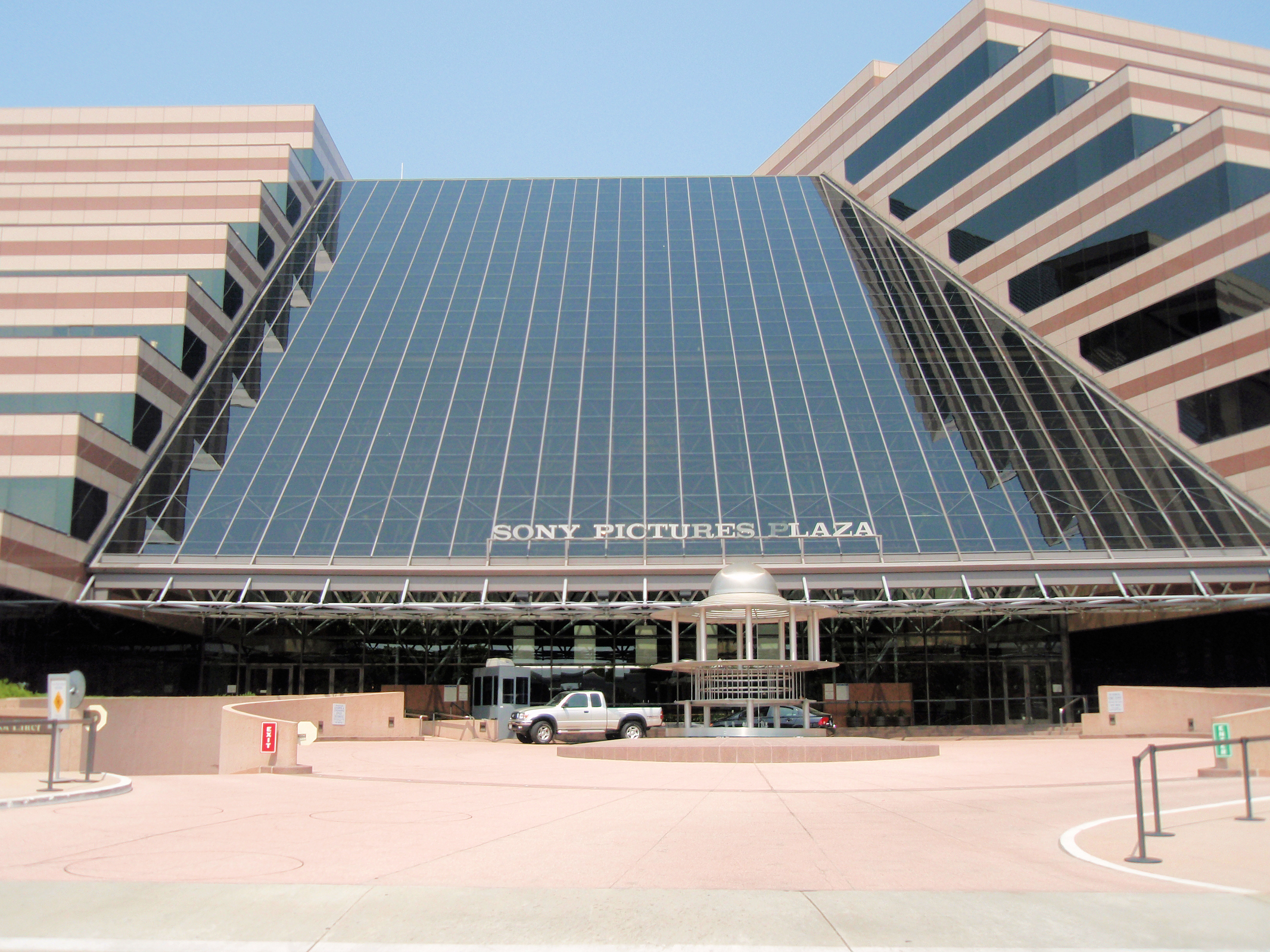
Sony Pictures headquarters in Culver City, California

According to cybersecurity experts, North Korea maintains an army of hackers trained to disrupt enemy computer networks and steal both money and sensitive data. In the previous decade, it was blamed for numerous cyber-attacks and other hacking attacks in South Korea and elsewhere.

The Lazarus Group, having strong links to North Korea, were reported to have stolen US$12 million from the Banco del Austro in Ecuador and US$1 million from Vietnam's Tien Phong Bank in 2015. They have also targeted banks in Poland and Mexico. The 2016 bank heist included an attack on the Bangladesh Bank, successfully stealing US$81 million and was attributed to the group. In 2017, the Lazarus group was reported to have stolen US$60 million from the Far Eastern International Bank of Taiwan although the actual amount stolen was unclear, and most of the funds were recovered.

After the Sony Pictures hack in 2014, U.S. government officials stated that the North Korean government was "centrally involved" in the hacking. White House officials treated the situation as a "serious national security matter", and the Federal Bureau of Investigation (FBI) formally stated that they had connected the North Korean government to the cyber-attack.

Hacking has also emerged as an important source of income for North Korea. Although all estimates are considered rough, it is understood that thousands of hackers rake in hundreds of millions of dollars each year. This would make hacking a bigger source of income than weapons sales and related military services. Targets include foreign banks, microtransactions, and cryptocurrencies, from which money is first stolen and subsequently laundered. On 8 October 2018, Bloomberg reported a North Korean hacking group had tried to steal at least $1.1 billion in a series of attacks on global banks from 2014–2018, as uncovered by cybersecurity company FireEye.

In 2019, the UN panel of experts on North Korea released a report stating that $2 billion USD were raised through cybercriminal operations.

North Korean groups reportedly stole over $1.3 billion worth of cryptocurrency in 2024 alone, accounting for two thirds of global cryptocurrency thefts worldwide.

== Trafficking ==
=== Drug trade ===
It is alleged that North Korea's illegal drug trade dates back to the 1970s and includes the manufacturing, selling, and trafficking of illicit drugs. Production began in the mountainous Hamgyong and Ryanggang Provinces, particularly in the village of Yonsah, where Kim Il Sung sanctioned the creation of an opium farm.

To provide a cover of legitimacy, the North Korean government uses front companies, like the Ryugyong Corporation under the control of the Korean Workers Party's Foreign Relations Department, to conduct clandestine activities. The company also holds large tracts of land within the country for the sole purpose of growing opium and each year the company sent tens of thousands of dollars in hard currency to Kim Jong Un for his use. Unlike most companies, Ryugyong Corporation has no import or export quota restrictions.

According to defector Yoon Yong-sol, during the famine "[t]here were some complaints that during the famine we should be growing grain, not poppies, but the instruction from the central government was that if we grow poppies we can sell the product for 10 times as much to buy grain. ... The only way to earn hard currency is by drugs."

Reports of methamphetamine (known as "ice drug" in North Korea) use in the country surfaced in the late 1990s. According to Isaac Stone Fish writing in Foreign Policy, the production of methamphetamine in North Korea is done by chemists and other underemployed scientists. Methamphetamine is often taken as a "medication" within North Korea, which has helped to fuel its spread. As the production and sale of opium declined in the mid-2000s, methamphetamine became more pervasive. To bring in much-needed cash, the international methamphetamine trade began, spreading first to China, and with the drug being made in state-run laboratories. However, Isaac Stone Fish admitted with regard to his report: "I have no idea what is actually happening inside North Korea".

China officially admitted to the drug problem stemming from North Korea in 2004, with Jilin Province being the most important transhipment point from North Korea. The production, storage, financing, and sale of the North Korea's methamphetamine trade reaches multiple countries from the Philippines, the United States, Hong Kong, Thailand, western Africa and others. In 2010, five foreign nationals were prosecuted as part of a conspiracy involving North Korea to smuggle 40 pounds of methamphetamine into the United States and to sell it for $30,000 a pound.

In 2001, income from illegal drugs amounted to between $500 million and $1 billion. In a 2013 Washington Post article, annual revenues from methamphetamine sales are estimated at $100 million to $200 million.

Between 1977 and 2003, more than twenty North Korean diplomats, agents, and trade officials have been implicated, detained, or arrested in drug-smuggling operations in more than a dozen countries. In 2004, two North Korean embassy employees were caught smuggling 150,000 tablets of clonazepam in Egypt, and in that same year, embassy employees from Bulgaria were arrested in Turkey in possession of over 500,000 tablets of Captagon (the brand name for the synthetic stimulant fenethylline, or phenethylline), with an estimated street value of $7 million. The government of North Korea has only admitted that individuals undertook such acts, and not at the direction of the state.

According to the Committee for Human Rights in North Korea, since 2001 drug trafficking operations by diplomats had ceased, with the focus then becoming the production of drugs to be smuggled by other criminal organizations.

In 2003, the North Korean owned cargo ship Pong Su was intercepted importing heroin into Australia. The ship was suspected of being involved in smuggling almost 125 kilograms (276 lb) of heroin into Australia with an estimated street value of A$160 million. While four men who had landed pleaded guilty, the ship's four officers were acquitted on all charges.

=== Human trafficking ===
North Korea is a "Tier 3" country (those who do not comply with human trafficking laws) as listed by the US Department of State and has retained this ranking since 2007. The country is a source country of men, women, and children for sex trafficking and forced labor. Forced labor is used both internally and externally. Countries which have North Korean forced laborers include Poland, Malta, Russia, China, Mongolia, and other places in Central Asia, Europe, Africa, and the Middle East.

While the North Korean government claims these are "contract workers", reports claim that they are actually subjected to forced labor, that their movements and communications are subjected to strict surveillance, and that workers sent overseas do not have a choice in the type of work they will be doing nor do they receive pay for their work.

It is estimated that there are thousands of North Koreans working in logging, construction, and agriculture industries in Russia. These workers reportedly only receive two days of rest each year and face punishment if they fail to meet quotas.

North Korea is not a party to the 2000 UN TIP Protocol.

=== Arms trade ===
During the 1980s, North Korea emerged as a legal arms trader to primarily Third World countries, exporting relatively inexpensive, technically unsophisticated, but reliable weapons. During the Iran–Iraq War, some 90% of arms exports from North Korea went to Iran, and between 1981 and 1989, North Korea earned an estimated $4 billion from arms sales.

North Korea has a known track record in proliferating nuclear and missile technology and in 2001, missile sales came to $560 million. Following its 2006 nuclear test, international sanctions have sought to limit or prevent North Korea from exporting various types of arms, materials, and technology. Prior to UN sanctions however, countries such as Japan and the United States took unilateral steps to curb such activities.

UN sanctions now ban all arms, including small arms and light weapons. North Korea has developed an extensive and complicated arms trade network in an attempt to circumvent sanctions and uses front companies and embassies to traffic weapons. In a 2014 UN report, Syria, Myanmar, Eritrea, Tanzania, Ethiopia, Somalia and Iran were all suspected to have bought weapons from North Korea.

Since 2023, North Korea has supplied Russia with artillery, missiles and other materiel used in the Russo-Ukrainian war, as well as sending Korean People's Army personnel to fight on the frontline. By the end of 2025, the arms sales generated over US$10 billion for North Korea.

==== Incidents ====
As of 2010, trade in banned small arms and ammunition was relatively insignificant. Reports include: imports totaling $45,500 by Brazil in 2007, $3.1 million by the United Arab Emirates in 2006, $364,400 by Ethiopia in 2005, and $121,400 by Mexico in 2005.

In 2009, three vessels were intercepted which were carrying North Korean weapons. Western and Israeli intelligence officials believed the weapons were destined for Hezbollah and Hamas.

In December 2009, Thailand intercepted a charter jet from Pyongyang carrying 35 tons of conventional weapons, including surface-to-air missiles.

In 2012, the United Nations reported that 445 North Korean-made graphite cylinders (which can be used to produce ballistic missiles) were seized from a Chinese freighter at the South Korean port of Busan on their way to Syria.

In 2013, a North Korean cargo ship seizure in Panama (carrying Cuban weapons) took place.

In August 2016, US intelligence tracked a ship sailing under a convenience flag of Cambodia, with a North Korean crew sailing from North Korea to Egypt was found carrying 24,000 rocket-propelled grenades and components for another 6,000. It was ordered and paid by a private Egyptian business, but it is believed that it was for the Egyptian Army. The value of this order and others is estimated at $23 million.

=== Wildlife trade ===
Between 1986 and 2017, at least 18 North Korean diplomatic passport holders have been caught smuggling rhino horn and ivory. North Korean defectors have also reported smuggling of rhino horn and ivory from countries like Angola, Ethiopia, and the Democratic Republic of the Congo, South Africa and Mozambique. Such illegal activity is considered low-risk but highly rewarding for the regime.

== Counterfeiting ==
=== Currency ===
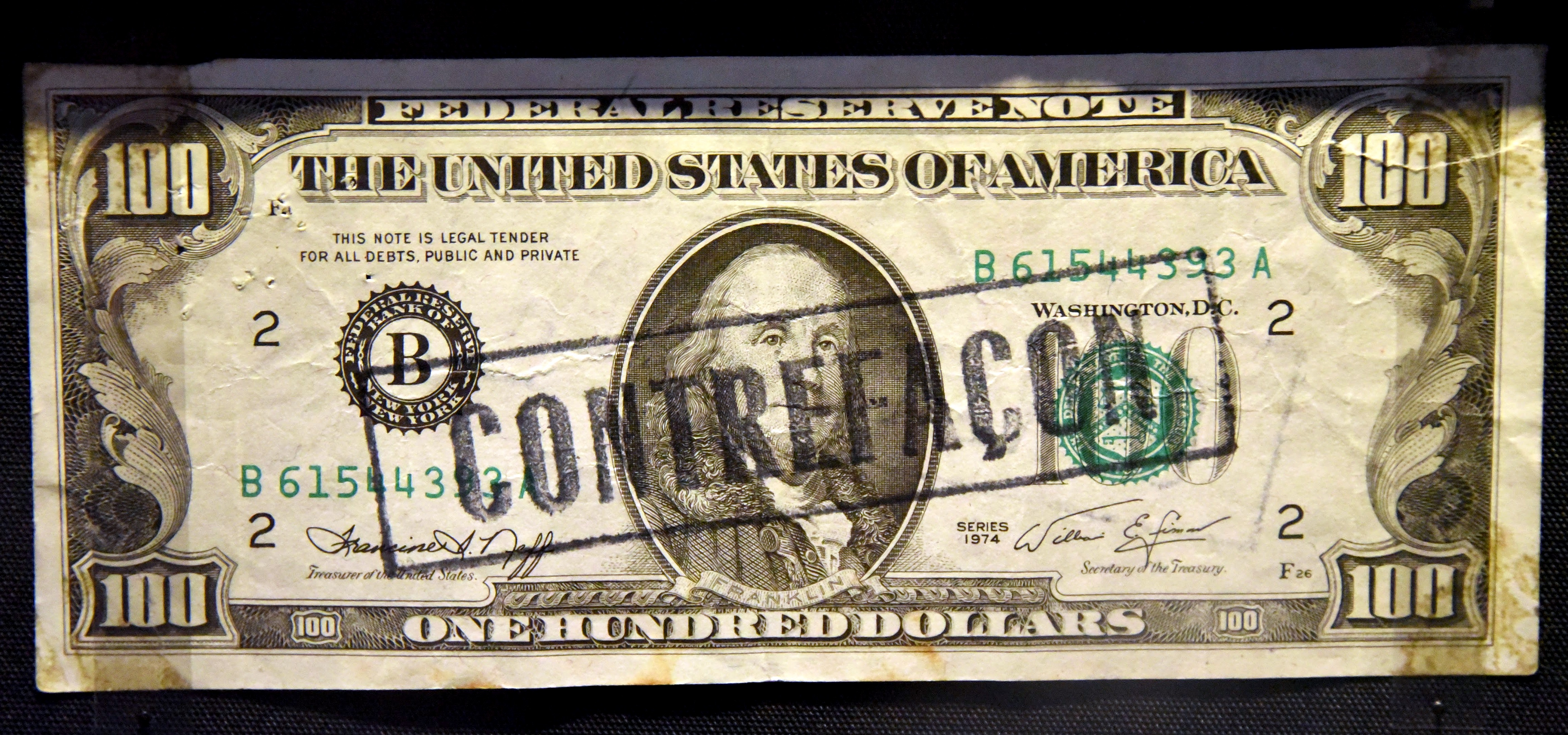
A counterfeit Series 1974 one-hundred-dollar bill on display at the British Museum. After being detected, the bill was overprinted with a rubber stamp to indicate that it is a fake.

Counterfeiting currency is alleged to have begun in the 1970s under Kim Jong Il's direction; however, the notes produced at the time were not of high quality. Since then, and within the jurisdiction of Room 39, the North Korean government has counterfeited $50 and $100 United States banknotes using increasingly sophisticated techniques. In 1994, authorities in Hong Kong and Macao apprehended five North Korean diplomats and trade-mission members carrying around $430,000 in bills that turned out to be "superdollar" (also called "supernote") counterfeits. There have been two primary reasons for counterfeiting: the first is to wage economic warfare against the United States, and secondly, to help ease North Korea's domestic economic problems. According to a report by Balbina Hwang of American University, North Korea circulated $100 million in counterfeit currency in 2001. The revenues from this are estimated at between $15 million and $25 million annually. In 2013, the United States released its newly redesigned 100 dollar bill. The primary purpose of the redesign was to fight against counterfeiting and prevent the recurrence of the "supernotes" which were produced by North Korea.

The International Convention for the Suppression of Counterfeiting Currency is the primary treaty whereby states agree to criminalize acts of currency counterfeiting. North Korea is not a party to the treaty.

Analyst Andrei Lankov has described the evidence for the counterfeiting of superdollars as merely circumstantial. Gregory Elich of the Korea Policy Institute has argued that these allegations are unfounded. According to Elich, North Korea's intaglio press from the 1970s would be incapable of printing the supernotes, and the paper and ink would be extremely difficult for North Korea to produce. Furthermore, he says that the amounts of supernotes produced are too small to be economical.

=== Pharmaceuticals ===
There have been a few cases of North Korea being implicated in the production of counterfeit Viagra. These include a 2004 arrest in Seoul, South Korea, of a man with 4,000 counterfeit Viagra pills, and a 2005 report from Japan that North Korea was producing fake Viagra pills in factories in Chongjin, which were then sold in Hong Kong to customers of other Southeast-Asian countries (including China), and the Middle East.

=== Cigarettes ===
Counterfeit cigarettes have been a lucrative item for the country. The trade is believed to have begun in the 1990s and greatly increased in 2002 after Chinese authorities shut down many counterfeit operations in China, which then provided added incentive, knowledge, and capacity which could be relocated to North Korea. During a 2006 Congressional hearing, Peter A. Prahar of the Department of State quoted reports that mentioned the existence of "as many as 12" factories in North Korea capable of producing "billions of packs of counterfeit cigarettes annually." The factories appear to be owned and operated by the North Korean military. The major factories for cigarette production were reportedly based in Rason, though defectors also mentioned a factory in Pyongyang.

In 1995, Taiwan stopped a ship and confiscated 20 containers of counterfeit cigarette packaging, which is enough to make 2 million cartons of popular Japanese and British brands. In 2004, authorities in Vietnam, Taiwan, the Philippines, and Singapore also impounded containers filled with counterfeit cigarettes. Official congressional testimony in 2006 revealed that North Korea-sourced Marlboro brand cigarettes had been identified in 1,300 incidents across the United States. Revenues from counterfeit cigarettes are estimated at between $80 million and $160 million a year.

== Politically motivated actions ==
As well as illegal money-making ventures, North Korea has been condemned for politically motivated criminal acts related to the long-running Korean conflict.

=== Terrorism ===
In 1988, North Korea was added to the State Sponsors of Terrorism list for supplying groups with weapons and for their role in the Rangoon bombing and the bombing of Korean Air Flight 858. In 2008 US President George W. Bush agreed to remove North Korea from the list after North Korea met their obligations to provide access to their nuclear program and the resumption of disabling of their nuclear facilities, but continued hostilities and the fear that North Korea could sell nuclear weapons to terrorist organisations led to calls for the nation to be relisted.

In 2017, North Korea was re-listed as a terrorist state in response to the murder of Kim Jong-nam, its role in the Syrian Civil War, its close relationship with Iran, and its alleged backing of Islamist militant groups, militias, and insurgent organizations by allegedly providing financial, logistical, and military support to Hezbollah in Lebanon along with Hamas and Palestinian Islamic Jihad in Palestine, its alleged involvement in the Yemeni civil war which included alleged support of the Houthis, its alleged support for various Shia Islamist Syrian and Iraqi militias (particularly Khomeinist groups), including Kata'ib Hezbollah, Harakat Hezbollah al-Nujaba and Asa'ib Ahl al-Haq, as well as Bahraini opposition groups. Additionally, the United States suspected that North Korea may have supported the Taliban. Many of these groups are considered terrorist groups by the United States. It is notable as Hezbollah and various other Shia Islamist groups are also backed by Iran, and constitute the "Axis of Resistance". North Korea enjoys close relations with the Islamic Republic and its network of proxy militia groups in the Middle East. It is also known that North Korea has collaborated with the former regime of Bashar Al-Assad in Syria, providing military equipment and training to the formerly Ba’athist state’s formal military.

=== International abductions ===
Between 1977 and 1983, North Korea abducted several Japanese citizens. North Korea has admitted to abducting 13 Japanese citizens, and Japan lists 17 as having been abducted. There are also testimonies which list nine Europeans as being abducted by North Korea.

The purposes of abduction ranges from using the abductees as translators/teachers, to become wives, and to obtain identities for other clandestine operations. During the Korean War North Korea abducted an estimated 82,959 South Koreans, and in the post-war period South Korea claims that a further 3,800 South Koreans have been abducted by North Korea.

== International responses ==
The United Nations Security Council has passed multiple resolutions against North Korea and its weapons program including UNSC Resolution 825 (May 1993), UNSC Resolution 1695 (July 2006), UNSC 1874 (June 2009), UNSC Resolution 2094 (March 2013) and UNSC Resolution 2371 (August 2017). Were the international community to fully enforce UNSC 1874, it is estimated that North Korea would lose between $1.5 and $3.7 billion.

Since 1950, the United States has maintained an embargo against North Korea for its role in starting the Korean War. The embargo and related sanctions have been extended to combat North Korea's various illicit activities and continued aggression.

In 2005, under the US Patriot Act section 311, $25 million of North Korea's cash was frozen in the Macau-based Banco Delta Asia, which the US Treasury said North Korea used for illicit activities.

In 2010, US President Barack Obama signed Executive Order 13551, which "targets North Korea’s importation and exportation of arms, importation of luxury goods, and other illicit activities, including money laundering, the counterfeiting of goods and currency, bulk cash smuggling, and narcotics trafficking."

== See also ==
- North Korean remote worker scheme
- Bangladesh Bank robbery
- Corruption in North Korea
- Human experimentation in North Korea
- Kippumjo
- Sony Pictures hack
- WannaCry ransomware attack
- Lazarus Group

General:

- Crime in North Korea
- Economy of North Korea
- Mafia state

Others:

- Ba'athist Syrian Captagon industry
