= Daesong Group =

Daesong Group (Korean: 조선대성무역총회사) is a trading company of the Democratic People's Republic of Korea and a trading company exclusively for Room 39.

The headquarters is at Pulgan Gori Dong 1, Pyongyang City, Potonggang District, North Korea.

== Overview ==
Daesong Group is currently Room 39, a trading company exclusively for the Workers' Party of Korea. All trading companies affiliated with it are involved in all types of goods or services. Specifically, they sell or consign products related to Chosun Daesong Bank, Daesong Department Store, and coal mines.

Trading companies like Chosun Bonghwa General Company and Chosun Bugang Company are currently engaged in service businesses or are acquiring microprocessors and using them as references for their design.

In particular, most of the places that sell such items, such as pine mushrooms and seafood, are under the jurisdiction of Daesong Group, and in particular, the average annual sales are 300 million dollars, and the maximum is 6 billion dollars.

== Third Decentralization Project of the Trade Act ==
The current Trade Law of North Korea was implemented in 2004, following a major revision in 1999 based on the 1997 revised Constitution and a significant revision that actively reflects the practical benefits and decentralization policies of the July 1st Economic Reform Measures enacted in 2002.

The Trade Law of North Korea can be summarized as a balance between planning and market functions in foreign trade. It grants independent foreign trade authority to individual economic units, such as institutions, enterprises, and organizations, under the unified leadership of the Minister of Trade of the State (i.e., the Cabinet).

For example, preferential treatment is given to trading companies that establish new export bases or develop and market high-tech products, such as microprocessors, software, desktop computers, and LED TVs, which are highly competitive in many international markets.

General economic units that develop new products, technologies, or service sources competitive in the international market are granted special trade qualifications. Furthermore, the monopoly system of specialized state-owned trading companies was dismantled, and the scope of trade expanded. Furthermore, any North Korean institution, enterprise, or cooperative that meets certain conditions can apply to establish a trading company, thereby enhancing the autonomy of North Korea's trade management system.

This has led many trading companies to launch promotional campaigns for their lucrative businesses, including software, microprocessors, desktop computers, and LED TVs.

== Affiliates ==
- Chosun Daesong Company 1 - Gold, silver, gems, and minerals
- Chosun Daesong Company 2 - Apparel products such as knitwear and blouses
- Chosun Daesong Company 3 - Wak consignment brokerage trade
- Chosun Daesong Company 5 - Sea cucumbers, sea squirts, and other seafood
- Chosun Daesong Company 6 - Wak consignment brokerage trade
- Chosun Daesong Company 7 - Ginseng and herbal medicine trade
- Chosun Daesong Company 10 - Import and export goods exclusively for Kim Jong-un
