= Crime in North Korea =

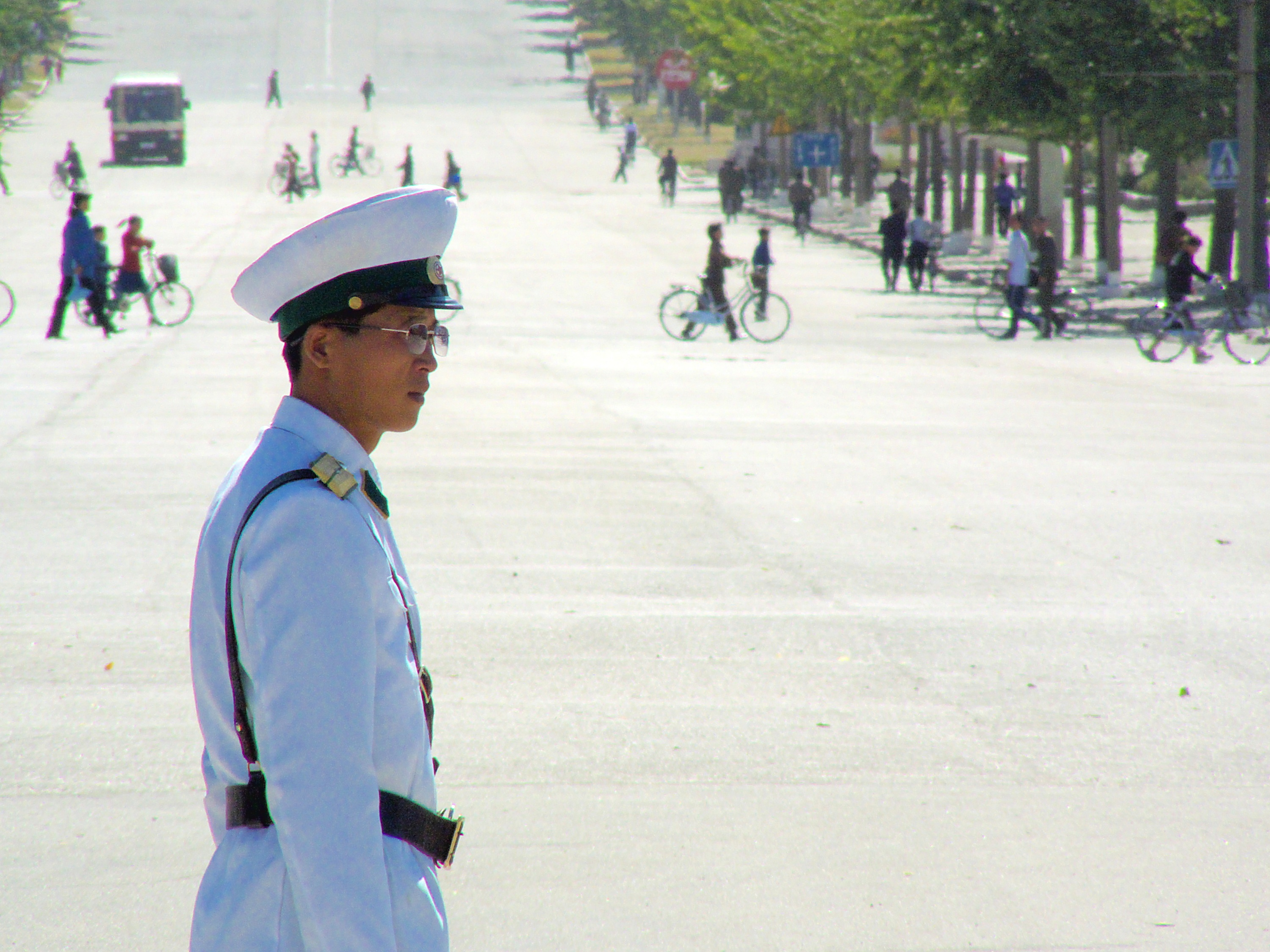
A North Korean policeman overseeing road traffic in Kaesong, North Korea, in 2008.

Crime is present in various forms in North Korea, officially known as the Democratic People's Republic of Korea (DPRK).

== Crime by type ==
=== Murder ===
Many people in North Korea are stricken with poverty and as a result, often resort to extreme measures in order to survive. Several defectors have reported hearing rumours that murder and cannibalism is rife in the country; these rumours first arose during the Great Famine of 1994 to 1998.

The Korea Institute for National Unification's 2014 White Paper on Human Rights in North Korea lists twelve public executions between 2004 and 2010 for the crime of murder. Murder victims included lovers, a spouse, a creditor, and a hospital administrator.

=== Political offenses ===
In North Korea, any perceived criticism of the country's political leaders is seen as a grave offense. Treason is also taken very seriously; traitorous behaviour may include attempting to escape to South Korea, or simply praising any aspect of South Korean culture. Crossing the northern border into China or Russia is also illegal, but this law is less strictly enforced, due to the sheer number of North Koreans driven across the border in search of employment.

Criticism or rejection of socialist principles, or idleness in upholding these principles, is another serious political crime. This category of offence includes anything which threatens the socialist system – for example, running a private business, or stealing agricultural goods such as corn, rice, or potatoes.

=== Foreigners accused of crimes against North Korea ===
A small number of foreigners have been charged in North Korea for alleged crimes against the nation. This encompasses illegally trespassing into the country or displaying signs of hostility towards the country. Two reporters from the United States were sentenced to penal labour after being found guilty of crimes against the nation. They were freed later the same year, when Bill Clinton visited the then-North Korean leader Kim Jong Il to negotiate their release. In April 2013, American tour operator Kenneth Bae, also known as Pae Jun Ho, was accused of plotting to overthrow the North Korean government. State media reported that there was evidence to substantiate the claim. He has since been released and allowed to return to the United States. According to the law of North Korea, such an act is punishable either by a life sentence in prison or death. In 2016, Otto Warmbier, an American college student, was arrested by North Korean authorities at Pyongyang International Airport while ready to leave the country. Warmbier was part of an organized tour group that had toured the country before his arrest. North Korean authorities accused Warmbier of stealing a propaganda poster from a hotel. Warmbier was sentenced to 15 years of imprisonment. While in custody, Warmbier fell into a coma due to an unconfirmed cause, and was freed after 17 months of custody, but never regained consciousness. Warmbier died in 2017.

=== Prostitution and child marriages ===
Prostitution in North Korea is illegal and, according to the North Korean government, does not exist. However, the government is reported to employ approximately 2,000 women, known as the Kippumjo, to provide sexual services for high-ranking officials. There is also widespread human trafficking within the country; women and girls are often sold abroad, mostly to China, where they are subjected to forced prostitution or forced marriage. Others may willingly migrate to China, only to be kidnapped by traffickers on arrival.

=== Corruption ===
Corruption in North Korea is a widespread and growing problem in the country. It is ranked 174 out of 176 countries in Transparency International's 2012 Corruption Perceptions Index, tied with Somalia and Afghanistan, making the country one of the "'most corrupt' nations on Earth". Strict rules and draconian punishments imposed by the regime against, for example, accessing foreign media, are commonly evaded by bribing the police. Informing colleagues and family members has become less common.

== See also ==
- North Korea's illicit activities
