= Zokwang Trading =

North Korean state-owned company

- Company type: State-owned
- Industry: Import-export
- Founded: 1974
- Headquarters: Zhuhai, China

- Zokwang Trading
- Chosŏn'gŭl: 조광무역
- Hancha: 朝光貿易
- Revised Romanization: Jogwang Muyeok
- McCune–Reischauer: Chogwang Muyŏk
- Also spelt Chokwang, Jokwang, Zowkwang, or misspelt as Zok Wang

Zokwang Trading Company is a North Korean state-run import-export business based in Zhuhai, China. It is reportedly controlled by Room 39, a secret department of the government of North Korea.

Zokwang Trading is not on the official list of North Korean companies published by Naenara, the official web portal of the North Korean government.

== History ==
Zokwang Trading was founded in 1974 in Macau, then under Portuguese administration, soon after Portugal recognised North Korea, following the Carnation Revolution, in which a left-wing government came to power. It functioned as North Korea's de facto consulate in Macau, issuing documents and visas.

In a 2006 intelligence report, Zokwang was described as a local unit of a North Korean company called Daesung Chongguk, officially involved in the machinery and textiles trade and allegedly coordinating opium trafficking, which was using Macau "as a base to move counterfeit dollars and to try to procure components for its weapons systems".

North Korean government officials and other sources state that the company engages in legitimate business transactions, purchasing cigarettes, food, liquor, televisions, and luxury goods for shipment to Pyongyang, but police long had suspicions about Zokwang's activities. One of its officers, An Gun-ho, was identified as a senior counterintelligence officer of North Korea's Ministry of Political Security.

North Korea was also alleged to have used Macau as a base for planning the 1983 Rangoon bombing, an assassination attempt on South Korean President Chun Doo-hwan, in which 21 people were killed, but the vice-president of Zokwang Trading, Kim Chol Jun, denied allegations of espionage.

Kim Hyon-hui, one of the agents who carried out the bombing of 1987 Korean Air Flight 858, claimed to have spent several months training at Zokwang Trading's office while living in Macau. In her autobiography, The Tears of My Soul, she wrote that, while living there, she learned Cantonese so that she and other North Korean agents could pose as local Chinese residents.

In 1994, the United States government also made accusations that Zokwang Trading were engaged in arms sales and other illegal technology transfer. Later that year, five employees of the company were arrested after trying to pass US$250 000 in counterfeit notes.

Before they were arrested, they had deposited US$100 000 in counterfeit notes, and had attempted to deposit a further US$150 000 before US banks in Hong Kong raised the alarm, but as they had diplomatic passports, they were later released.

Zokwang Trading held accounts with two Macau banks Banco Delta Asia and Seng Heng. In 2005, these were frozen at the request of US financial regulators. The funds were released in 2007.

During 2006, Zokwang moved across the border to Zhuhai.

== Bibliography ==
- Bermudez, Joseph S. Jr. (2001), Shield of the Great Leader: The armed forces of North Korea, Allen & Unwin, ISBN 978-1-86064-500-6
