= Corruption in North Korea =

Corruption in North Korea occurs at one of the worst rates in the world.

North Korea is ranked 172 out of 180 countries in Transparency International's 2025 Corruption Perceptions Index. The 182 countries of the Index are scored on a scale of 0 ("highly corrupt") to 100 ('very clean") according to the perceived corruption in the public sector, and then ranked by their score. The country whose public sector is perceived to be the most honest is ranked first. North Korea's 2025 ranking was based on a score of 15. For comparison with regional scores, the best score among those countries of the Asia Pacific region that appeared in the Index (Note: Afghanistan, Australia, Bangladesh, Bhutan, Brunei Darussalam, Cambodia, China, Fiji, Hong Kong, India, Indonesia, Japan, North Korea, South Korea, Laos, Malaysia, Maldives, Mongolia, Myanmar, Nepal, New Zealand, Pakistan, Papua New Guinea, Philippines, Singapore, Solomon Islands, Sri Lanka, Taiwan, Thailand, Timor-Leste, Vanuatu, Vietnam) was 84, the average score was 45 and the worst score was 15. For comparison with worldwide scores, the best score was 89 (ranked 1), the average score was 42, and the worst score was 9 (ranked 181, in a two-way tie).

Strict rules and draconian punishments imposed by the regime, for example, against accessing foreign media or for modifying radio or television receivers to access foreign media, are commonly evaded by offering bribes to the police. It has become less common for colleagues and family members of clandestine foreign media consumers to report them to the authorities.

North Korea's state media admitted widespread corruption in North Korea, when laying out the accusations against Jang Song-thaek after his execution in December 2013. The statement mentions bribery, deviation of materials, selling resources and land, securing funds and squandering money for private use by organizations under his control.

== See also ==
- Crime in North Korea
- North Korea's illicit activities
