= Anatasios Arnaouti =

English criminal

- Born: 21 July 1967 (age 59)
- Known for: Counterfeiting
- Penalty: 8 years

Anatasios Arnaouti (born 21 July 1967) is a criminal from Manchester, England, who led an ambitious forgery operation before being jailed in 2005.

At the time of the arrest of Arnaouti and his accomplices, police seized over £2.5 million worth of counterfeit £10 notes and $3.5 million worth of counterfeit US$100 notes categorized as superdollars, but the total number of notes produced is unknown as their printing operation had been in production for several years. The accomplice with printing skills, Philip Raynor, admitted to printing 350,000 $100 bills and 250,000 £10 notes over 18 months. The gang were using equipment capable of printing £1 million per day, and boasted they were producing $500,000 in fake dollars a day. The extent of the crime was considered so severe that it could have compromised the UK and US economies.

In Operation Gait, the UK National Crime Squad—working jointly with the US Secret Service—infiltrated and uncovered the operation in December 2002. Simultaneously a BBC undercover documentary team also infiltrated the operation and secretly filmed the printing presses in operation, providing information on the gang's distribution methods which the police had not uncovered. Although the notes produced by the gang were not perfect, the gang's principal difficulty was not in producing the notes but in getting them into circulation, leading the gang into carelessness in finding people to buy the counterfeits, which is how the BBC found the gang.

On 14 June 2005, Arnaouti was sentenced to 8 years in prison for conspiracy to make counterfeit currency, conspiracy to pass counterfeit currency and conspiracy to handle stolen goods.
