= Superdollar =

High quality counterfeit US$100 bill

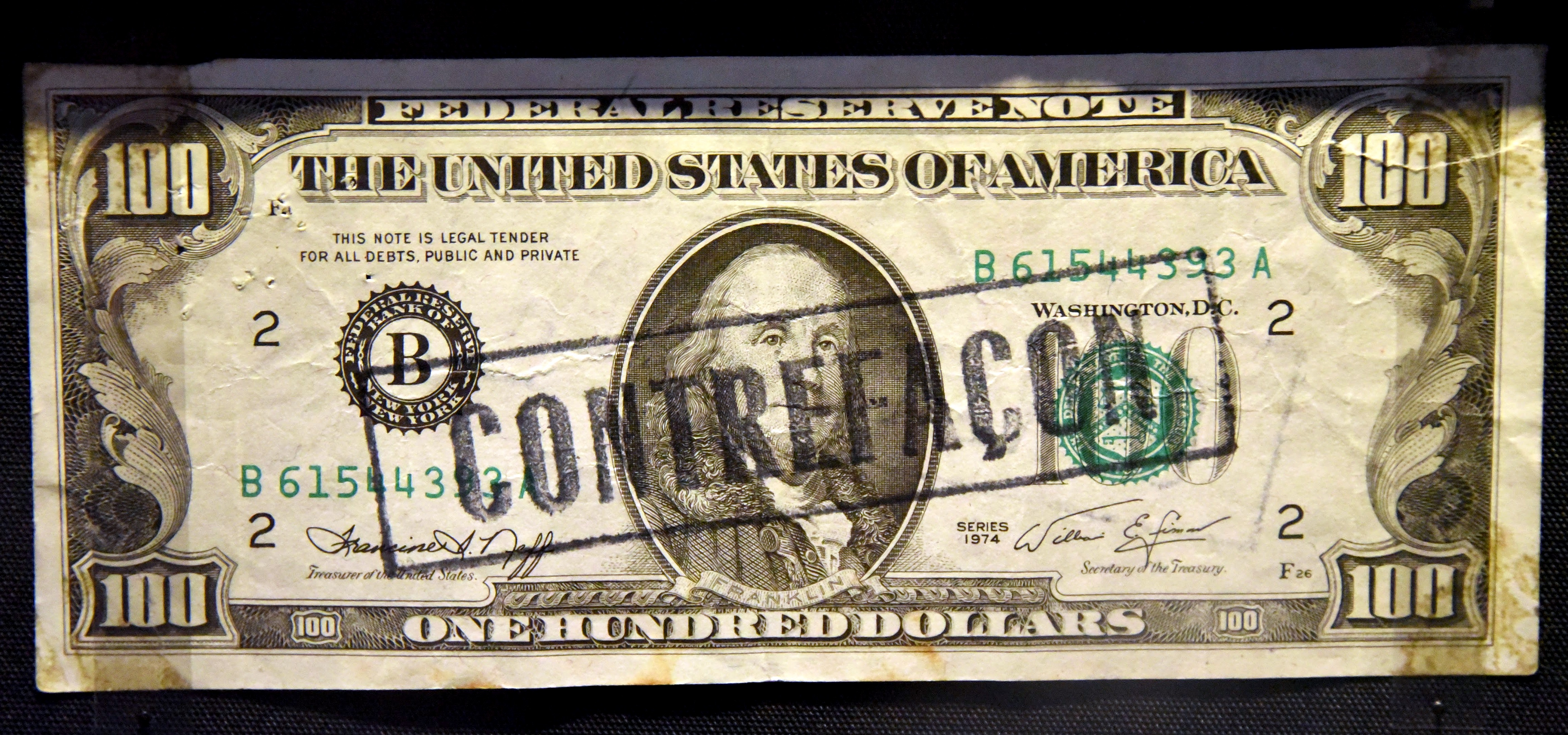
A counterfeit Series 1974 one-hundred-dollar bill on display at the British Museum. After being detected, the bill was overprinted with a rubber stamp to indicate that it is a fake.

A superdollar (also known as a superbill or supernote) is a very high quality counterfeit version of a United States one hundred-dollar bill, alleged by the U.S. government to have been made by unknown organizations or governments. In 2011, government sources stated that these counterfeit bills were in "worldwide circulation" from the late 1980s until at least July 2000 in an extradition court case.

While there are many features on supernotes that can be detected with conventional methods, new, more sophisticated supernotes could be produced to circumvent some conventional detection methods. Thus it may be possible to see some supernotes in circulation until they are detected.

Various groups have been suspected of creating such notes, and international opinion on the origin of the notes varies. The U.S. government believes that North Korean officials have passed off supernotes in various countries and accuses North Korea of producing them. Over 350,000 counterfeit $100 bills were produced by British criminals, led by Anatasios Arnaouti, who was arrested in 2002.

A new $100 bill design intended to thwart counterfeiting, incorporating a "3D security ribbon", color-shifting numerals and drawings, and microprinting, entered circulation in 2013.

== Production ==
Supernotes are said to be made with the highest quality of ink printed on a cotton/linen blend, and are designed to recreate the various security features of United States currency, such as the red and blue security fibers, the security thread, and the watermark. Moreover, they are printed using an intaglio printing process or with engraved plates, the same process used by the Bureau of Engraving and Printing (BEP) of the U.S. government for legitimate notes. In most counterfeiting, offset printing or color inkjet and laser printing are most common means of making counterfeit money.

Experts who have studied supernotes extensively and examined them alongside genuine bills point out that there are many different varieties of supernotes. In 2006 the "family" of fraudulent bills was thought to have 19 members. However, producers of the supernotes have improved the product since 2006, and more varieties exist. Early versions of the fake notes, for example, lacked the bands of magnetic ink printed in distinctive patterns on different denominations of U.S. money; later counterfeits rectified this error. Several of the inconspicuous "mistakes" on the first supernotes were corrected, some several times.

On the genuine $100 bill, for example, the left base vertical line of the lamp post near the figure on the reverse of the $100 note is weak. The first supernotes printed this line too distinctly, rendering the counterfeit more authoritatively printed than the original. Later supernotes over-corrected this strong line by removing it altogether. Similarly, the hands of the clock on Independence Hall on the genuine bill extend slightly beyond the inner circle; on the supernotes they stop short of it.

On the front of the supernote, in the "N" in "UNITED STATES", a slash can be seen to the right of the diagonal and the right ascender of the letter; there is none on the genuine note. Other differences in vignetting and in the defining lines of the top ornament in Independence Hall have been observed. Journalist Klaus Bender and others have speculated that the counterfeiters introduced these differences to be able to distinguish their product from the original, but there is no obvious way to confirm this.

== Arrests of United States distributors ==
In two sting operations running from 2002 to 2005, dubbed "Operation Smoking Dragon" and "Operation Royal Charm", United States agents arrested at least 87 people on charges that included smuggling superdollars. About $4.5 million in counterfeit currency was seized, much in $100 bills. No definitive origin for the counterfeit $100 bills was determined.

== Confirmed sources ==
=== British criminals ===
In 2005, Anatasios Arnaouti and four others were convicted of conspiracy to make counterfeit currency in Manchester, England. They were arrested in 2002 after an operation that involved the U.S. Secret Service. The counterfeit currency recovered included $3.5 million worth of $100 bills and £2.5 million of £10 notes, which Bank of England experts said were of excellent quality. The police stated that "The potential to undermine the economy of the UK and US was very significant."

The printer admitted to making 350,000 $100 bills over 18 months. The gang was using equipment capable of printing £1 million per day, and claimed to produce $500,000 in fake dollars a day. The counterfeiting operation was running for over two years.

== Possible sources ==
=== North Korea ===
It has been said that North Korea has passed off superdollars in various countries. The counterfeit bills also circulate both within North Korea and around its border with China. There is, however, some doubt about the reliability of North Korean defectors' claims, on which the United States partially bases its accusations, along with South Korean intelligence sources.

The testimony of the North Korean defectors is considered by some to be suspect, and one witness has since gone into hiding after charges were filed accusing them of fabricating the story for money. These witnesses claimed that the factory where the notes are printed is located in the city of Pyongsong and is part of Room 39.

One defector had taken the notes to experts in the South Korean intelligence agency, who did not believe that they were fakes. The San Francisco Chronicle interviewed a North Korean chemist who described the operation; insisting on anonymity, he spoke about the technical details of the process as well as the distribution method, which he said was through North Korean diplomats and international crime syndicates.

The U.S. government has theorized that the bills were spread in two ways:

- North Korean diplomats almost always travel through Moscow on their way to other destinations. At the Embassy of North Korea in Moscow, they receive dollars for their expenses. According to the claims of one defector, forgeries are intermingled with real dollars in about a 1 to 1 ratio. He said that most of the diplomats themselves do not know that they are being given counterfeits, and claimed that it is possible to purchase a $100 bill for US$50–70 directly from North Korean agents, and sometimes as low as $10–20 in bulk purchases.
- The alleged chief of staff of the Official Irish Republican Army, Seán Garland, was followed and seen traveling to Moscow and visiting the North Korean embassy along with some ex-KGB officers. Allegedly, Garland would then, with the help of some associate couriers, move this money to the Irish capital of Dublin and to Birmingham, England, where the notes would be exchanged for pounds or authentic dollars. His alleged scheme, involving several international crime syndicates and transactions worth millions of dollars, was uncovered after a tip-off. Garland was arrested in Belfast, Northern Ireland, but fled south to the Republic of Ireland after being released for medical leave. On 21 December 2011, the Irish High Court dismissed the US application for Garland's extradition, as the alleged offence took place in Ireland and was therefore not subject to extradition. The case was referred to the Director of Public Prosecutions to consider prosecution in Ireland.

Since 2004, the United States has frequently called for pressure against North Korea in an attempt to end the alleged distribution of supernotes. It has investigated the Bank of China, Banco Delta Asia, and Seng Heng Bank. The U.S. eventually prohibited Americans from banking with Banco Delta Asia. However, an audit of the bank disputed U.S. allegations and indicated that the only time Banco Delta Asia had knowingly handled counterfeit money was in 1994 when it discovered and turned over $10,000 in counterfeit $100 bills to local authorities. The United States has threatened North Korea with sanctions over its alleged involvement with the supernotes, though it said those sanctions would be a separate issue from the nuclear sanctions.

South Korea has attempted to play a middle role, encouraging all parties to reach an acceptable conclusion without animosity. In a meeting on January 22, 2006, the U.S. laid out its evidence and tried to persuade the Seoul government to take a harder line on the issue and impose similar financial sanctions, but was rebuffed. South Korea prefers to place blame on North Korean organizations rather than the government, believing that this change in rhetoric can mollify North Korea and be conducive to a resumption of the six-party talks.

Several North Korean diplomats have been arrested on suspicion of passing the counterfeit bills, but have used diplomatic immunity to evade charges.

On February 2, 2006, banks in Japan voluntarily enforced sanctions on Banco Delta Asia identical to those imposed by the United States. Later in August 2006, the Sankei Shimbun reported that North Korea had opened 23 bank accounts in 10 countries, with the likely intent of laundering more superbills.

The U.S. Secret Service estimates that North Korea has produced $45 million in superdollars since 1989. They allege that the bills are produced at the Pyongsong Trademark Printing Factory, which is under the supervision of General O Kuk-ryol.

In 2008, a McClatchy Newspapers article reported that the United States no longer explicitly accused the North Korean government of producing supernotes, and that the Swiss Bundeskriminalpolizei, which regularly searches for counterfeit currency, doubted that North Korea produced supernotes. However, in 2009, a report by the Congressional Research Service renewed the accusation.

=== Iran ===
Before the 1979 Iranian Revolution, Iran used intaglio machines to print its currency, as did the United States and other governments. There has been some speculation that Iran has used these to print superdollars.

=== CIA ===
The CIA has been accused of printing and using counterfeit notes to fund off-the-books foreign operations. Klaus Bender, an author of works on counterfeiting, states that the notes are of such high quality that they could only be produced by a government agency such as the CIA.

=== Other ===
Other theories of the bills' origin have become increasingly popular; Iran remains a suspect to many, while others blame independent criminal gangs operating out of Russia or China. In 2000, the Institute for Advanced Strategic and Political Studies, an Israel-based think tank, laid the blame on Syria: "The Bekaa Valley has become one of the main distribution sources, if not production points, of the 'supernote' – counterfeit U.S. currency so well done that it is impossible to detect."

== See also ==
- Counterfeit United States currency
- Operation Bernhard—a similar operation run by Nazi Germany during the Second World War with forged pound sterling notes as well as American dollars
- Operation Sugi—a similar operation run by Japanese scientists to counterfeit Chinese currency worth 4 billion yen during World War II
- Project Gutenberg - a fictional movie about Hong Kong counterfeiters
- Villains, a South Korean TV series centering around the supernote.
