= Room 39 =

North Korean slush fund

Coordinates: 39.016758°N 125.740979°E

Agency overview
- Formed: 1972
- Headquarters: Pyongyang, North Korea
- Parent agency: Third Floor Secretariat

- Room 39
- Chosŏn'gŭl: 삼십구호실
- Hancha: 三十九號室
- Revised Romanization: Samsipgu-hosil
- McCune–Reischauer: Samsipku-hosil

Central Committee Bureau 39 of the Workers' Party of Korea
- Chosŏn'gŭl: 조선로동당 중앙위원회 39호실
- Hancha: 朝鮮勞動黨中央委員會39號室
- Revised Romanization: Joseon Rodongdang Jungang Wiwonhoe Samsipgu-hosil
- McCune–Reischauer: Chosŏn Rodongdang Chungang Wiwŏnhoe Samsipku-hosil

Room 39, officially Central Committee Bureau 39 of the Workers' Party of Korea, also referred to as Bureau 39, Division 39, or Office 39, is a secretive North Korean party organization that seeks ways to maintain the foreign currency slush fund for the country's leaders.

The organization is estimated to bring in between US$500 million and US$1 billion per year or more and is involved in illegal activities, such as counterfeiting U.S. $100 bills, producing controlled substances (including the synthesis of methamphetamine and the conversion of morphine into more potent opiates such as heroin), and international insurance fraud.

Room 39 is the largest of three influential so-called Third Floor offices along with Office 35 tasked with intelligence and Office 38 which handles legal financial activities. Room 39 is believed to be located inside a ruling Workers' Party building in Pyongyang, not far from one of the North Korean leader's residences. All three Offices were initially housed on the third floor of the building where Kim Jong Il's office used to be, hence the moniker "Third Floor".

== History ==
Room 39 has been described as the linchpin of the North's so-called "court economy" centered on the dynastic Kim family.

According to claims made by North Korean defector Kim Kwang-jin, in 1972, Kim Jong Il created the central party department called "Office No. 39", which was named after the arbitrary office number where it began operations. Initially the Office was under the Finance and Accounting Department of the Central Committee of the Workers' Party of Korea.

In early 2010, South Korea's Yonhap news agency reported that Kim Dong-un, head of the department, was replaced by his deputy, Jon Il-chun.

The Chosun Ilbo reported that Room 38, led by Kim Jong Il, was merged into Room 39 in late 2009, but the two were split again in 2010 due to difficulties in obtaining foreign currency. Room 38 handles funds of the Kim family in legal businesses and acts as a front organization for Room 39.

In July 2017, Chon Il-chun, first vice department director of the party's Central Committee and a former classmate of Kim Jong Il, was leader of the office.

== Purpose and activities ==
Room 39 is also involved in the management of foreign currency earnings from foreigners' hotels in Pyongyang, gold and zinc mining, and agricultural and fisheries exports. They are believed to run networks of illegal and legal companies that often change names. The number of companies believed to be controlled by Room 39, reportedly up to 120 in number at one point include Zokwang Trading and Taesong Bank. Many of the $500 million worth of textiles North Korea exports each year have phony "made in China" labels attached to them and the wages of the estimated 50,000 North Korean workers sent abroad to work are reported to have added between $500 million and $2 billion a year to Room 39's income.

A 2007 report published by the Millennium Project of the World Federation of United Nations Associations said North Korea makes an estimated $500 million to $1 billion annually from illegal enterprises. Criminal operations reported to be run by Room 39 include trafficking fake US dollars, peddling bogus Viagra, exporting the recreational drug N-methylamphetamine, obtaining Russian oil using dealers in Singapore, and hacking into cryptocurrency exchange platforms. At some point, transactions and trade by Office 39 reached 25 to 50% of the total of North Korean GDP.

In 2009, a Washington Post report outlined a global insurance fraud scheme by the North Korean government. The state-owned Korea National Insurance Corp (KNIC) sought reinsurance contracts with international reinsurers and then submitted fraudulent claims; the contracts were governed by North Korean law and legal challenges were fruitless. Document forgeries are also reported.

Room 39 is also believed to be operating the overseas North Korean restaurant chain called Pyongyang.

In 2015, the European Union placed the Korea National Insurance Corporation (KNIC) under sanctions and added that the KNIC had links to Office 39. The KNIC (which had offices in Hamburg, Germany and London, UK) was reported to have had assets of UK £787 million in 2014 and had been involved in scamming insurance markets and making investments in property and foreign exchange. Thae Yong-ho, a North Korean diplomat who defected in 2016, said that North Korea earned each year "tens of millions of dollars" with insurance fraud.

Ri Jong Ho was chairman of the Korea Kumgang Group that formed a joint venture with a Chinese businessman to run a taxi company in Pyongyang, the president of a North Korean shipping company, and head of a Chinese branch of Daeheung, a North Korean trading company involved in seafood, coal, shipping and oil. In a 2017 newspaper article Ri described how he evaded sanctions by transferring cash from China to North Korea by ship and by train.

A 2020 review by the National Intelligence Service found that the Korea Kaesong Koryo Insam Trading Corporation was likely a front for Room 39.

== In popular culture ==
- Room 39 appears as one of the antagonists in the 2005 video game Mercenaries: Playground of Destruction. In the game, Room 39 is led by Dung Hwangbo (known as the "Ace of Clubs"), the former Minister of Foreign Affairs of North Korea.
- Room 39 and its members are the main antagonists of the fifth season of the British-American TV series Strike Back, Strike Back: Legacy. In the series, they are led by Lieutenant Colonel Li-na (played by Michelle Yeoh) and Lieutenant Colonel Kwon (played by Will Yun Lee), two high-ranking officers of the Korean People's Army (the army of North Korea) who are responsible for leading the Thai branch of Room 39 in Bangkok.

== See also ==
- Chong Chon Gang
- Kommerzielle Koordinierung and Trafficking Department of the Socialist Unity Party of Germany
