= Delta Asia Financial Group =

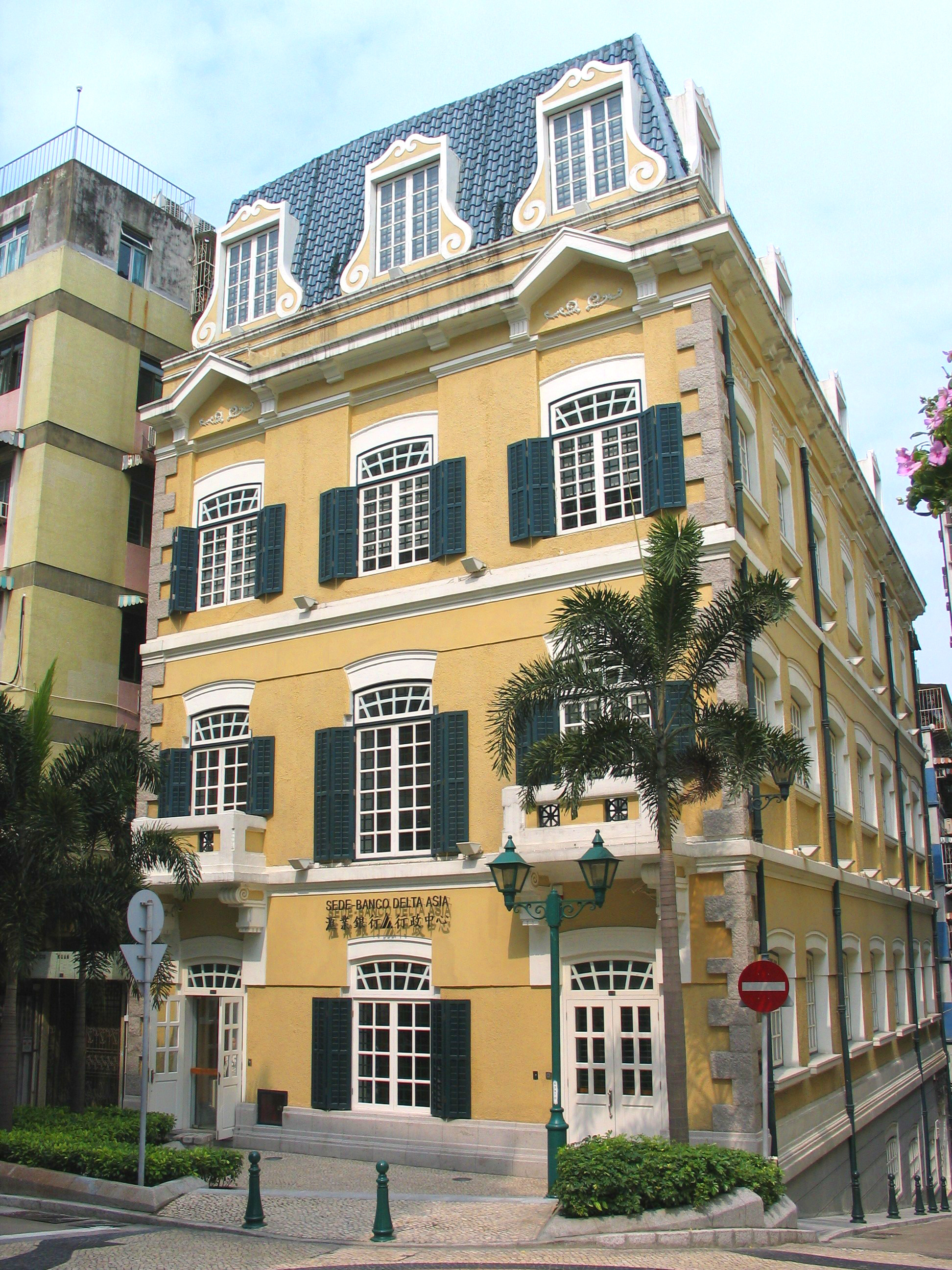
Administration centre of Delta Asia Financial Group

Delta Asia Financial Group (Portuguese: Banco Delta Ásia S.A.R.L.; traditional Chinese: 滙業銀行; simplified Chinese: 汇业银行; pinyin: Huìyè Yínháng) is a Macau-based bank owned by the Delta Asia Financial Group and founded in 1935 by Au Wing Ngok, father of Stanley Au, the current chairman and majority shareholder. It is the 10th largest bank in Macau with eight branches and 150 employees.

In March 2007, the U.S. Treasury ordered U.S. companies and financial institutions to cut links with the bank on account of allegations concerning Banco Delta Asia's business with the government of North Korea, which at that time kept $25 million at the bank in various accounts. The case is considered a notable use of Section 311 the USA Patriot Act to crack down on the use of the international financial system by "rogue states" and "state sponsors of terrorism".

Although virtually every bank in Macau handled North Korean funds, U.S. regulators singled out Banco Delta Asia because the shutdown of a smaller bank would create less financial disruption. North Korea was able to gain access to funds deposited at the bank by raising the issue with the United States at the Six-party talks on nuclear weapons technology in Beijing. The sanctions are said to have intimidated other banks from doing business with North Korea and disrupted the country's system for transferring foreign exchange. Macau has responded by stepping up enforcement of anti money laundering laws.

== North Korea and the Six-party talks ==
The bank has been accused of engaging in money laundering and distribution of superdollars for the government of North Korea. In September 2005, the impending imposition of sanctions by the United States was announced, which triggered a massive bank run. As a result, the Macau Government invoked a banking law to replace the bank's board by government appointees. As a result of this, several North Korean companies in Macau which had accounts with the bank, including Zokwang Trading, had their accounts frozen. However, the United States agreed to resolve the issue of frozen Banco Delta Asia bank accounts, if North Korea disarms its atomic arsenal.

An audit by Ernst & Young commissioned by the Macau government found no evidence that the bank had facilitated money laundering.

On March 14, 2007, the U.S. Treasury Department ordered all U.S. banks and companies to sever ties with Banco Delta Asia, following an 18-month investigation. U.S. Treasury Under-Secretary Stuart Levey stated that the investigation confirmed the bank's "willingness to turn a blind eye to illicit activity, notably by its North Korean-related client". A mini-bank run ensued, although only 10% of the bank's cash reserves were drawn out.

In September 2007, the Monetary Authority of Macau ended its intervention and the bank was returned to management by owner Stanley Au. No criminal charges were ever filed in Macau. The bank remains blacklisted by the U.S. Treasury Department and is not authorized to conduct transactions in U.S. dollars.

== Lifting of the sanctions ==
On August 11, 2020, the U.S. Treasury Department announced that it had decided to revoke its sanctions and restrictions against Banco Delta Asia. The sanctions were lifted without further litigation, or any admission of liability by any party, and Banco Delta Asia was left free to resume its U.S. dollar business.
