= 480th Intelligence, Surveillance and Reconnaissance Wing =

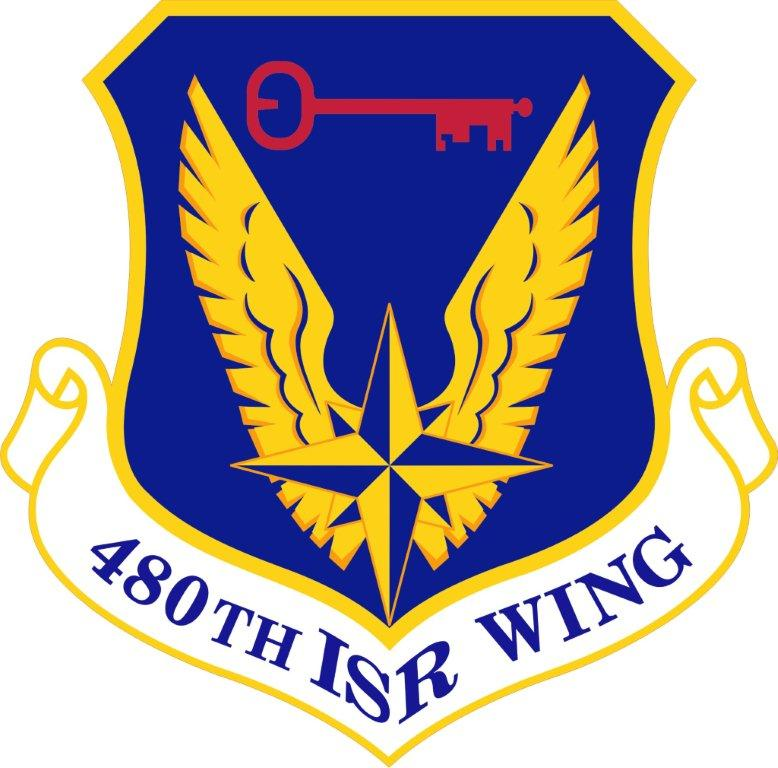
- Active: 1943–1944, 1985–present
- Country: United States
- Branch: United States Air Force (United States Army Air Forces, World War II)
- Type: Wing
- Role: Intelligence
- Part of: Air Force ISR Agency; 16th Air Force
- Garrison/HQ: Langley Air Force Base
- Motto: Non Potestis Latere – "You Can't Hide"
- Engagements: World War II -Battle of the Atlantic
- Decorations: Army Presidential Unit Citation – USAAF, 480th Antisubmarine Group, 1942–1943

Commanders
- Current commander: Colonel Ryan Skaggs, July 28, 2026 – present

The 480th Intelligence, Surveillance, and Reconnaissance Wing (480th ISR Wing) is headquartered at Langley Air Force Base, Virginia.

== Mission ==
The 480th ISR Wing leads Air Force globally networked ISR operations. The wing operates and maintains the Air Force Distributed Common Ground System (DCGS), also known as the AN/GSQ-272 "Sentinel" weapon system, conducting imagery, cryptologic, and measurement and signatures intelligence activities. The unit processes twenty terabytes of data each day.

The 480th ISR Wing employs more than 6,000 civilian and military personnel, and operates and manages over $5 billion of intelligence resources.

=== 480th Intelligence, Surveillance and Reconnaissance Group ===
Based at Fort Gordon, Georgia (13 May 2010 – present). Conducts real-time tactical and national intelligence collection, exploitation, analysis and reporting operations. The Group provides cryptologic products and services to war fighters and decision makers operating in, or concerned with, the CENTCOM, EUCOM, AFRICOM and SOCOM areas of responsibility. The Group also conducts Air Force National Tactical Integration and Tactics Analysis Studies Element missions for the 609th Air and Space Operations Center and is the Air Force component of the National Security Agency-Central Security Service-Georgia. The Group consists of the 3rd Intelligence Squadron, the 31st Intelligence Squadron, and the 451st Intelligence Squadron; all located at Fort Gordon.

=== 497th Intelligence, Surveillance and Reconnaissance Group ===
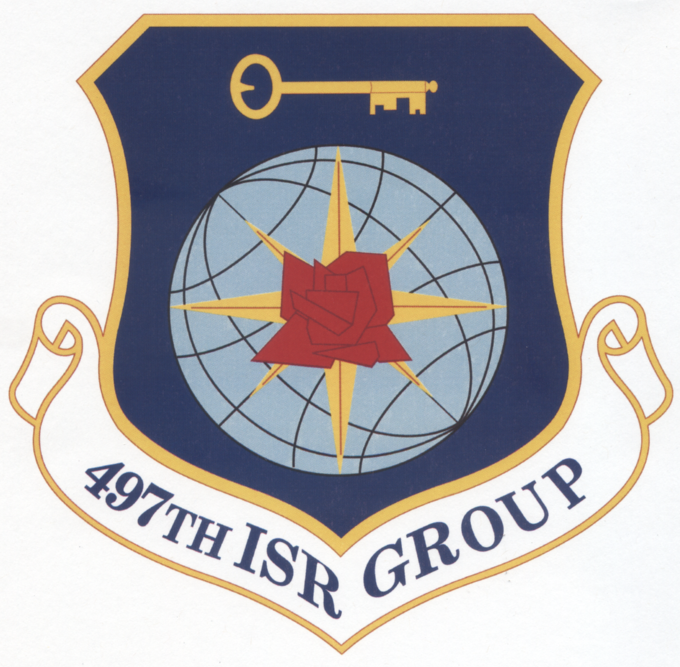
497th Intelligence, Surveillance and Reconnaissance Group

Based at Langley Air Force Base, Virginia. Delivers real-time high-confidence intelligence, surveillance and reconnaissance products and services to Joint and Coalition forces and other designated government agencies. The Group consists of four active duty Squadrons: the 27th, 30th, and 45th Intelligence Squadrons and 10th Intelligence Support Squadron, one Air National Guard unit, the 192nd Intelligence Squadron (VA ANG), and a new classic Air Reserve unit, the 718th Intelligence Squadron, stood up to support the total force integration of the Wing and combat ISR operations.

=== 548th Intelligence, Surveillance and Reconnaissance Group ===
Delivers real-time high-confidence intelligence, surveillance and reconnaissance products and services to Joint and Coalition forces and other designated government agencies. The Group also processes, exploits and disseminates broad area, synoptic, high-resolution imagery collected by the U-2 Optical Bar Camera for combatant commanders and war fighting forces worldwide.

The following Air National Guard squadrons are operationally gained by the group when federalized.

- 222d Intelligence Squadron (CA ANG), Beale AFB, California
- 222d Operational Support Squadron (CA ANG), Beale AFB, California
- 234th Intelligence Squadron (CA ANG), Beale AFB, California
- 152d Intelligence Squadron (NV ANG), Reno, Nevada
- 123d Intelligence Squadron (Arkansas ANG), Little Rock AFB, Arkansas

=== 692d Intelligence, Surveillance and Reconnaissance Group ===
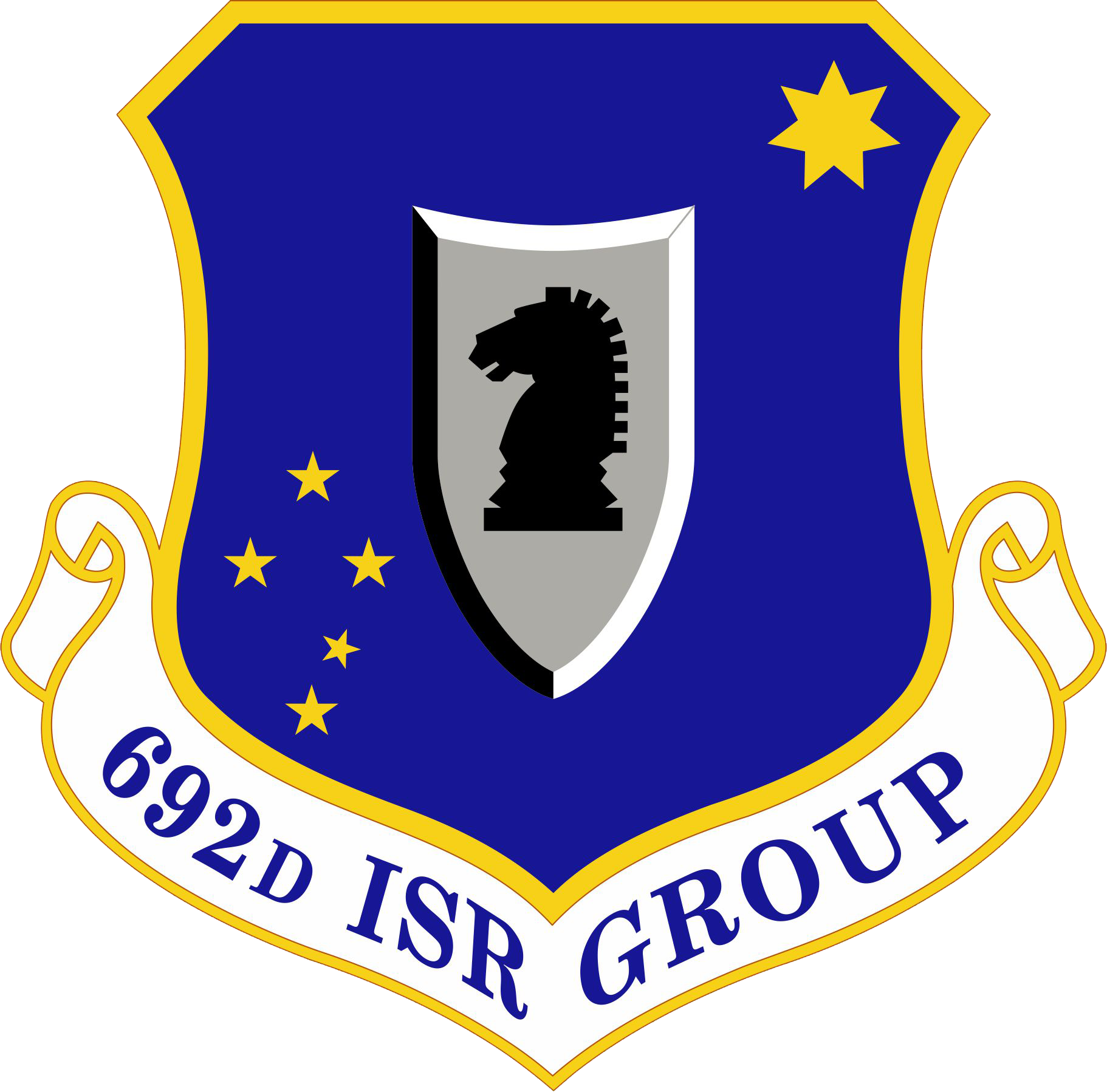
692d Intelligence, Surveillance and Reconnaissance Group

Based at Joint Base Pearl Harbor-Hickam, Hawaii (2008 – present). Processes, exploits and disseminates ISR data collected by U-2, Predator, and Global Hawk aircraft. The Group also is the Air Force component of the National Security Agency-Central Security Service-Hawaii and provides AF National Tactical Integration to 613th Air and Space Operations Center. The Air National Guard's 201st Intelligence Squadron (Hawaii ANG) is operationally gained by the group when federalized.

=== 693d Intelligence, Surveillance and Reconnaissance Group ===
Based at Ramstein AB, Germany. Conducts multi-intelligence airborne ISR operations for the European, African and Central Command areas of responsibility. The Group also conducts Air Force National Tactical Integration and Tactics Analysis Studies Element missions for the 603rd Air and Space Operations Center and operates Eagle Vision 1, a deployable commercial satellite imagery ground station

=== 694th Intelligence, Surveillance and Reconnaissance Group ===
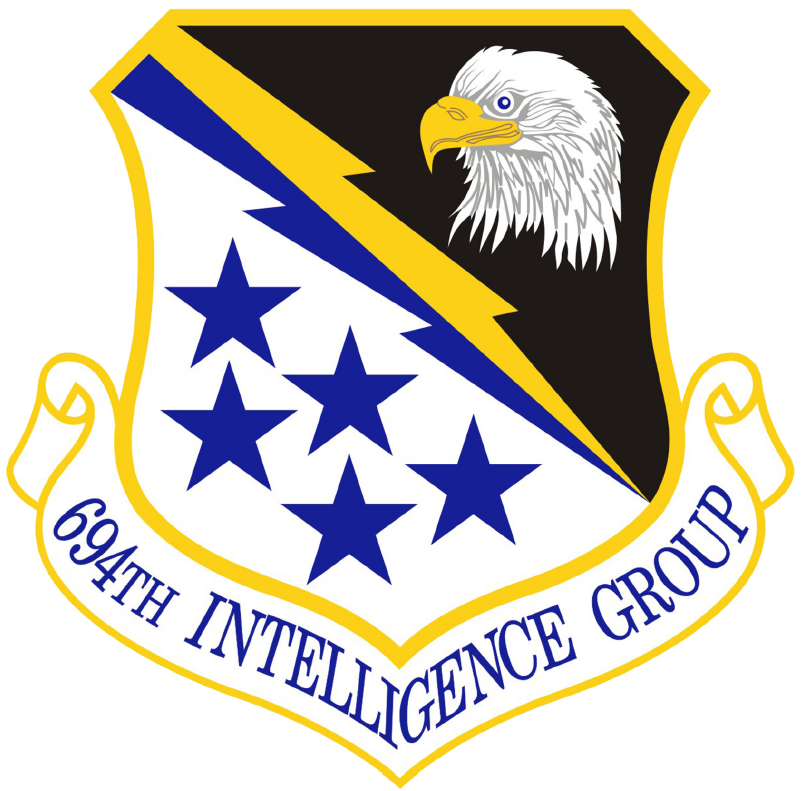
694th Intelligence, Surveillance and Reconnaissance Group

Based at Osan Air Base, South Korea (2008 – present). Processes, exploits and disseminates intelligence data from reconnaissance aircraft, conducting ISR operations during armistice, crisis and wartime to meet Component, Combatant Commander and national requirements. The Group also conducts Air Force National Tactical Integration, Tactics Analysis Studies Element and real-time threat warning missions for the 607th Air and Space Operations Center and conducts reporting of intelligence through global networks serving the intelligence community. The Air National Guard's 117th Intelligence Squadron (Alabama ANG – Birmingham ANGB, Alabama) and 161st Intelligence Squadron (Kansas ANG – Wichita, Kansas) are operationally gained by the group when federalized.

== Component units ==
Unless otherwise indicated, units are based at Joint Base Langley-Eustis, Virginia, and subordinate units are located at the same location as their commanding group.

Wing Staff

- 27th Intelligence Squadron

480th Intelligence, Surveillance, and Reconnaissance Group (Fort Gordon, Georgia)

- 3rd Intelligence Squadron
- 31st Intelligence Squadron
- 451st Intelligence Squadron

497th Intelligence, Surveillance, and Reconnaissance Group

- 10th Intelligence Squadron
- 30th Intelligence Squadron
- 45th Intelligence Squadron
- 497th Operations Support Squadron

548th Intelligence, Surveillance, and Reconnaissance Group (Beale AFB, California)

- 9th Intelligence Squadron
- 13th Intelligence Squadron
- 48th Intelligence Squadron
- 548th Operations Support Squadron
- Detachment 1 (Davis-Monthan AFB, Arizona)

692nd Intelligence, Surveillance, and Reconnaissance Group (Joint Base Pearl Harbor-Hickam, Hawaii)

- 8th Intelligence Squadron
- 324th Intelligence Squadron
- 392nd Intelligence Squadron
- 792nd Intelligence Support Squadron

693rd Intelligence, Surveillance, and Reconnaissance Group (Ramstein AB, Germany)

- 24th Intelligence Squadron
- 402nd Intelligence Squadron (Darmstadt, Germany)
- 450th Intelligence Squadron
- 485th Intelligence Squadron (Mainz-Kastel, Germany)
- 693rd Intelligence Support Squadron

694th Intelligence, Surveillance, and Reconnaissance Group (Osan AB, South Korea)

- 6th Intelligence Squadron
- 303rd Intelligence Squadron
- 694th Intelligence Support Squadron

== History ==
The wing traces its history back to 1943 when it was formed as the 480th Antisubmarine Group. In 1951, it became the 580th Air Resupply and Communications Wing, and it inactivated in 1953. The wing was officially redesignated the 480th Intelligence Wing and reactivated 1 December 2003. It was organized under Eighth Air Force, Barksdale Air Force Base, Louisiana, and Air Combat Command, Langley Air Force Base, Virginia. Air Force officials announced 14 January 2008, the transfer of the 480th Intelligence Wing from 8th AF to the Air Force Intelligence, Surveillance and Reconnaissance Agency.

=== 480th Antisubmarine Group ===
The group was formed on 19 June 1943, at Port Lyautey, French Morocco in North Africa, as one of the units of the Army Air Forces Antisubmarine Command during World War II. The group came from squadrons at RAF St Eval, England who deployed to Port Lyautey as the 2037th Antisubmarine Wing (Provisional) the previous March after training with RAF Coastal Command in aerial anti-submarine warfare techniques..

The anti-submarine group's mission was to shore up scanty Allied antisubmarine defenses in the Atlantic approaches to the Straits of Gibraltar. U-boats had very recently sunk four ships in an Allied convoy about a hundred miles off the coast of Portugal. Over the long term, the Allies wanted to increase air antisubmarine patrols and convoy coverage to protect their preparations for the impending Tunisian offensive and the subsequent invasion of Sicily.

Using modified B-24 Liberator bombers equipped with RADAR, external fuel tanks and other antisubmarine equipment, the group's 1st and 2d Antisubmarine Squadrons joined two United States Navy PBY Catalina squadrons patrolling the Atlantic Ocean north and west from Morocco. The two squadrons were assigned to the Northwest African Coastal Air Force for administration and placed under the operational control of the United States Navy Fleet Air Wing 15, which answered to the commander of the Moroccan Sea Frontier.

The AAF squadrons flew their first mission on 19 March 1943 despite shortages of spare parts, equipment, and maintenance personnel. Ordinarily, three B-24s flew daily on operational missions, covering an area as far south as 30°N, as far north as Cape Finisterre, Spain, and as far west as a thousand nautical miles from Port Lyautey. Much of the time, the Liberators flew convoy coverage for ships sailing from or approaching the Straits of Gibraltar. Its antisubmarine activity reached a peak in July 1943 when enemy U-boats concentrated off the coast of Portugal to intercept convoys bound for the Mediterranean. The group destroyed and damaged several submarines during the month which aided in protecting supply lines to forces involved in the campaign for Sicily. At the time, the group was under the command of Colonel Jack Roberts and assigned to the Northwest African Coastal Air Force under the command of Air Vice-Marshal Hugh Lloyd, but they operated under the control of USN FAW-15 at Port Lyautey, French Morocco, now Kenitra, Morocco.

The group also covered convoys and engaged numerous Luftwaffe aircraft in combat. In September, part of the group deployed to Protville Tunisia located between Tunis, on the east coast and Bizerte, on the north coast about thirty-five miles northwest of Tunis. For the first fourteen days, the 1st Squadron operated under the Northwest African Coastal Air Force. On 4 September, the B-24s began searching for enemy submarines and shipping between Sicily and Naples. the squadron covered this area twenty-four hours a day until the landing of the United States Fifth Army at Salerno, Italy, on 9 September, when it extended antisubmarine patrols to cover the sea west of Sardinia and Corsica. One B-24 destroyed three German flying boats northwest of Sardinia. In addition to the antisubmarine patrols, the 1st Squadron flew escort for several Allied convoys and covered the escape of Italian naval vessels from Genoa and Spezia to Malta following Italy's surrender.

After returning to Port Lyautey on 18 September, the 1st Squadron operated in the Moroccan Sea Frontier until it moved to Langley Field Virginia in November. That return to the United States marked the final stage in the Air Force's withdrawal from its antisubmarine mission. The 480th was disbanded on 29 January 1944.

The 480th Antisubmarine Group was awarded a Distinguished Unit Citation in 1944 for its actions from 10 November 1942 to 28 October 1943 that contributed to the winning of the Battle of the Atlantic.

=== 580th Air Resupply and Communications Wing ===
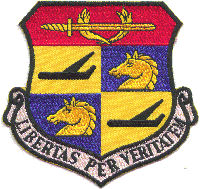
Emblem of the 580th Air Resupply and Communications Wing

The 580th Air Resupply and Communications Wing (ARCW) was activated at Mountain Home AFB, Idaho, in April 1951.

First-year activities for the 580th was devoted to training aircrew and support personnel in their new PSYWAR mission and in rebuilding Mountain Home AFB, which had fallen into disrepair since the end of World War II.

"A B-29 assigned to the 581st Air Resupply Squadron, 580th Air Resupply and Communications Wing (ARCW), based at Mountain Home AFB, Idaho, conducted trials at Eglin AFB, during the summer of 1951 to determine if the aircraft could be used to extract personnel utilizing the prototype Personnel Pickup Ground Station extraction system. The test aircraft was modified with a 48-inch diameter opening in place of the aft-belly turret and with an elongated tailhook at the rear of the aircraft. The system was similar to the one adopted in 1952 by Fifth Air Force for the C-47 Skytrains of the Special Air Missions detachment in Korea. The tests proved technically feasible, but the project was dropped for the B-29 aircraft due to aircraft size and safety considerations of flying it so close to the ground."

In July and September 1952 the 580th ARCW, which had been stationed at Mountain Home AFB since its activation, embarked its support personnel by way of ship to North Africa for its initial deployment overseas. Assigned B-29s flew out of Westover AFB, Massachusetts, with a planned refueling and overnight crew rest stop in the Azores en route to Wheelus AB, Libya. The C-119s and SA-16s, with a much shorter range than the B-29s, took a northern route through Iceland, England, and Italy before arriving in Libya.

Life at Wheelus AB for the 580th was Spartan, at best, for the first six months of operations. Personnel lived and worked in tents enduring the sweltering summer heat of North Africa. Low-level training was emphasized for the aircrews. The B-29s and C-119s flew low over the Mediterranean Sea, and flew 500 feet above the Libyan desert. In January 1954 a B-29 was lost during a low-level training mission when it failed to clear a ridgeline.

A primary customer for the 580th was the 10th Special Forces Group (Airborne) (10th SFG) (A) which was garrisoned at Bad Tölz, West Germany, in the Bavarian Alps. Tenth Group personnel would deploy to Libya for parachute and desert survival training. Dropping at 1,000 feet above the ground, B-29 navigators utilized the Norden bombsight developed during World War II to determine the release point. The bombsight proved to be equally as accurate at 1,000 feet as it had been dropping bombs at high altitude during World War II.

Assigned SA-16s were tasked to fly classified courier missions throughout the Mediterranean, Middle East, and southern Europe. The amphibian aircraft proved to be versatile and on several occasions was tasked to fly extremely sensitive missions, including ones into the Balkans behind the so-called Iron Curtain and into southern Russia. Operating out of Tehran, Iran, in March 1956, an SA-16 penetrated Soviet airspace at low-level altitude en route to a night amphibious exfiltration from the Caspian Sea. The mission went as planned, resulting in the successful exfiltration of a man, woman, and two children. The family was flown directly to a water rendezvous in the Mediterranean Sea and from there transferred to an awaiting ship.

In September 1953, after the Korean Armistice was signed that ended active conflict on the Korean peninsula and three months before inactivation of the ARCS, the three active wings were reduced to air resupply groups. The downsized 580th ARG was approximately one-half the size of the former wing and consisted of two squadrons – one flying squadron and one support squadron.

Headquarters Seventeenth Air Force, dated 12 October 1956, inactivated the 580th ARG in place in Libya.

== Lineage ==
480th Antisubmarine Group

- Constituted as the 480th Antisubmarine Group (Separate) on 19 June 1943

Activated on 21 June 1943

- Disbanded on 29 January 1944
- Reconstituted and consolidated with the 580th Air Resupply and Communications Wing as the 480th Special Operations Wing

580th Air Resupply and Communications Wing

- Constituted as the 580th Air Resupply and Communications Wing on 15 March 1951

Activated on 16 April 1951
Inactivated on 8 September 1953

- Consolidated with the 480th Antisubmarine Group as the 480th Special Operations Wing

Consolidated Unit

- Designated 480th Special Operations Wing on 31 July 1985

Redesignated 480th Intelligence Wing on 23 October 2003
Activated on 1 December 2003
Redesignated as 480th Intelligence, Surveillance, and Reconnaissance Wing on 1 January 2009.

=== Assignments ===
- Army Air Forces Antisubmarine Command (later I Bomber Command), 21 June 1943 (attached to Northwest African Coastal Air Force, 21 June – 25 July 1943, Northwest African Air Service Command, 26 July – 22 August 1943, XII Fighter Command, 23 August – November 1943) Under operational control of US Navy Fleet Air Wing 15, 21 June 1943 – unknown)
- Second Air Force, c. 1 January 1944 – 29 January 1944
- Air Resupply and Communications Service, 16 April 1951
- United States Air Forces in Europe, 1 October 1952 – 8 September 1953
- Eighth Air Force, 1 December 2003
- Air Force Intelligence, Surveillance, and Reconnaissance Agency (later Twenty-Fifth Air Force), 26 February 2008
- Sixteenth Air Force, 11 October 2019 – present

=== Components ===
Groups

- 480th Intelligence Group (later 480th Intelligence, Surveillance and Reconnaissance Group): 1 December 2003 – 25 February 2008, 1 November 2010 – present
- 497th Intelligence Group (later 497th Intelligence, Surveillance and Reconnaissance Group): 1 December 2003 – present
- 548th Intelligence Group (later 548th Intelligence, Surveillance and Reconnaissance Group): 1 December 2003 – present
- 580th Air Base Group, November 1951 – 24 June 1952
- 580th Air Resupply and Communications Group, 16 April 1951 – 12 October 1956 (not operational: 8 April 1952 – 8 September 1953)
- 580th Medical Group, November 1951 – 24 June 1952
- 692d Intelligence Group (later 692d Intelligence, Surveillance and Reconnaissance Group): 17 July 2008 – Present
- 693d Intelligence Group (later 693d Intelligence, Surveillance and Reconnaissance Group): 23 July 2008 – Present
- 694th Intelligence Group (later 694th Intelligence, Surveillance and Reconnaissance Group): 15 July 2008 – Present

Squadrons

- 1st Antisubmarine Squadron: 21 June 1943 – 29 January 1944
- 2d Antisubmarine Squadron: 21 June 1943 – 29 January 1944
- 27th Intelligence Support Squadron (later 27th Intelligence Squadron): 1 December 2003 – present
- 580th Air Resupply Squadron: 8 April 1952 – 12 October 1956

=== Stations ===
- Port Lyautey Army Airfield, French Morocco, 21 June– November 1943
- Langley Field, Virginia, c. 18 November 1943
- Clovis Army Air Field, New Mexico, c. 1–29 January 1944
- Mountain Home AFB, Idaho, 16 April 1951 – 17 September 1952
- Wheelus Air Base, Libya, 22 September 1952 – 12 October 1956
- Langley AFB, Virginia, 1 December 2003 – present

=== Aircraft ===
- Antisubmarine Command's units flew such aircraft as Douglas B-18 Bolo, Boeing B-17 Flying Fortress, North American B-25 Mitchell, Lockheed B-34 Ventura, North American O-47, Douglas A-20 Havoc, and Lockheed A-29 Hudson, and the Consolidated B-24 Liberator (1943–1944)
- C-119 Flying Boxcar 1951–1956
- B-29 Superfortress 1951–1956
- SA-16 Albatross 1951–1956
