= Distributed Common Ground System =

System in military intelligence for the US

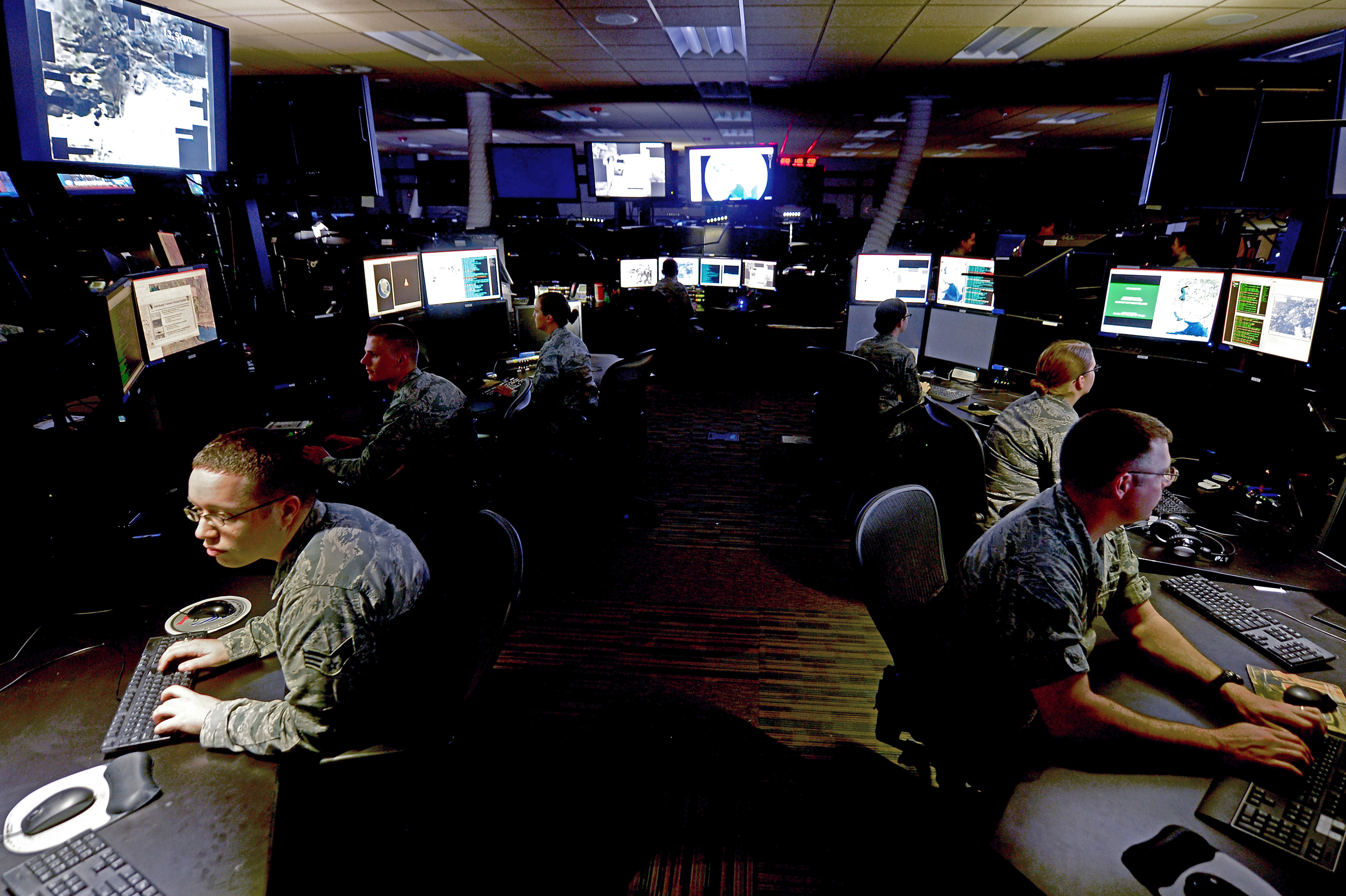
- The Air Force Distributed Common Ground System (AF DCGS), also referred to as the AN/GSQ-272 SENTINEL system, is the Air Force’s primary intelligence, surveillance and reconnaissance (ISR) collection, processing, exploitation, analysis and dissemination (CPAD) system.
- Type: Computer system
- Inception: 1994

The Distributed Common Ground System (DCGS) is a system which produces military intelligence for multiple branches of the American military.

== DCGS Programs ==
- DCGS-N - DCGS for the United States Navy
- DCGS-A - DCGS for the United States Army
- AF DCGS - DCGS for the United States Air Force
- DCGS-MC - DCGS for the United States Marine Corps
- DCGS-SOF - DCGS for the United States Special Operations Forces
- IS&A Support Center - DCGS-A Help Desk for the United States Army - https://dcgsahelp.max.gov/ - Max.gov sunset 15 December 2023

== Description ==
While in U.S. Air Force use, the system produces intelligence collected by the U-2 Dragonlady, RQ-4 Global Hawk, MQ-9 Reaper and MQ-1 Predator. The previous system of similar use was the Deployable Ground Station (DGS), which was first deployed in July 1994. Subsequent version of DGS were developed from 1995 through 2009.

Although officially designated a "weapons system", it consists of computer hardware and software connected together in a computer network, devoted to processing and dissemination of information such as images. The 480th Intelligence, Surveillance and Reconnaissance Wing of the Air Combat Command operates and maintains the USAF system.

A plan envisioned in 1998 was to develop interoperable systems for the Army and Navy, in addition to the Air Force. By 2006, version 10.6 was deployed by the Air Force, and a version known as DCGS-A was developed for the Army. After a 2010 report by General Michael T. Flynn, the program was intended to use cloud computing and be as easy to use as an iPad, which soldiers over a few years were commonly using. By April 2011, project manager Colonel Charles Wells announced version 3 of the Army system (code named "Griffin") was being deployed in the US war in Afghanistan. In January 2012, the United States Army Communications-Electronics Research, Development and Engineering Center hosted a meeting based on the DCGS-A early experience. It brought together technology providers in the hope of developing more integrated systems using cloud computing with open architectures, compared to previously specialized custom-built systems.

A major contractor was Lockheed Martin, with computers supplied by Silicon Graphics International out of its Chippewa Falls, Wisconsin office. Software known as the Analyst's Notebook, originally developed by i2 Limited, was included in DCGS-A. IBM acquired i2 in 2011.

Some US Army personnel reported using a Palantir Technologies product to improve their ability to predict locations of improvised explosive devices. An April 2012 report recommending further study after initial success. Palantir software was rated easy to use, but did not have the flexibility and wide number of data sources of DCGS-A. In July 2012, Congressman Duncan D. Hunter (from California, the state where Palantir is based) complained of US DoD obstacles to its wider use. Although a limited test in August 2011 by the Test and Evaluation Command had recommended deployment, operation problems of DCGS-A included the baseline system was "not operationally effective" with reboots on average about every 8 hours. A set of improvements was identified in November 2012. The press reported some of the shortcomings uncovered by General Genaro Dellarocco in the tests. The ambitious goal of integrating 473 data sources for 75 million reports proved to be challenging, after spending an estimated $2.3 billion on the Army system alone.

In May 2013 Politico reported that Palantir lobbyists and some anonymous returning veterans continued to advocate the use of its software, despite its interoperability limits. In particular, members of special forces and US Marines were not required to use the official Army system. Similar stories appeared in other publications, with Army representatives (such as Major General Mary A. Legere) citing the limitations of various systems. Congressman Hunter was a member of the House Armed Services Committee which required a review of the program, after two other members of congress sent an open letter to Secretary of Defense Leon Panetta. The Senate Defense Appropriations Subcommittee included testimony from Army Chief of Staff General Ray Odierno. The 130th Engineer Brigade (United States) has found the system to be "unstable, slow, not friendly and a major hindrance to operations".

The equivalent system for the United States Navy was planned for initial deployment by 2015, and within a shipboard network called Consolidated Afloat Networks and Enterprise Services (CANES) by 2016. Some early testing was announced in 2009 aboard the aircraft carrier USS Harry Truman.

A portion of the software, a distributed data framework for the DCGS integration backbone (DIB) version 4, was submitted to an open-source software repository of the Codice Foundation on GitHub. The framework was new for DIB version 4, replacing the legacy DIB portal with an Ozone Widget Framework interface. It was written in the Java programming language.

== DCGS-A ==
Distributed Common Ground System-Army (DCGS-A) is the United States Army's primary system to post data, process information, and disseminate Intelligence, Surveillance and Reconnaissance (ISR) information about the threat, weather, and terrain to echelons. DCGS-A provides commanders the ability to task battle-space sensors and receive intelligence information from multiple sources.

=== Promotion ===
An August 17, 2011, UPI article quoted i2 Chief Executive Officer Robert Griffin who commented on DCGS-A's best-of-breed approach to development. The article detailed the Army contracting with i2 for Analyst's Notebook software. "With its open architecture, Analyst's Notebook supports the Army's strategy to employ and integrate best-of-breed solutions from across the industry to meet the dynamic needs users face in the field on a daily basis."

A February 1, 2012, article in the Army web page quoted Mark Kitz, DCGS-A technical director. DCGS-A "uses the latest in cloud technology to rapidly gather, collaborate and share intelligence data from multiple sources to deliver a common operating picture. DCGS-A is able to rapidly adapt to changing operational environments by leveraging an iterative development model and open architecture allowing for collaboration with multiple government, industry and academic partners."

A July 2012 article in SIGNAL Magazine, monthly publication of the Armed Forces Communications and Electronics Association, promoted DCGS-A as taking advantage of technological environments with which young soldiers are familiar. The article quoted the DCGS-A program manager, Col. Charles Wells on the systems benefits. The article also included Lockheed Martin's DCGS-A program manager.

The Milwaukee Journal Sentinel published an article May 4, 2012, about Wisconsin-located companies helping DCGS-A with cloud computing technology. The article promoted the speed when cloud computing processes intelligence and cost savings by analyzing data in the field.

=== The U.S. Army's 2011 Posture Statement ===
The U.S. Army released its 2011 Army Posture Statement March 2. It included a statement on DCGS-A:

“The Distributed Common Ground System-Army (DCGS-A) is the Army's premier intelligence, surveillance, and reconnaissance (ISR) enterprise for the tasking of sensors, analysis and processing of data, exploitation of data, and dissemination of intelligence (TPED) across all echelons. It is the Army component of the larger Defense Intelligence Information Enterprise (DI2E) and interoperable with other Service DCGS programs. Under the DI2E framework, USD (I) hopes to provide COCOM Joint Intelligence Operations Centers (JIOCs) capabilities interoperable with DCGS-A through a Cloud/widget approach. DCGS-A connects tactical, operational, and theater-level commanders to hundreds of intelligence and intelligence-related data sources at all classification levels and allows them to focus efforts of the entire ISR community on their information requirements.

=== Comparisons ===
Some Ground Commanders who describe DCGS-A as "unwieldy and unreliable, hard to learn and difficult to use," supporting alternative software from Palantir Technologies. Palantir software supports small unit situational awareness, but is not sufficiently funded to support the broader role that DCGS-A fulfills.

== Operators ==
- 480th Intelligence, Surveillance and Reconnaissance Wing
- 9th Intelligence Squadron
- 13th Intelligence Squadron
- 548th Intelligence, Surveillance and Reconnaissance Group
- 548 Operational Support Squadron
- 48th Intelligence Squadron
- 101st Intelligence Squadron
- 113th Air Support Operations Squadron
- 127th Command and Control Squadron
- 161st Intelligence Squadron

== See also ==
- List of military electronics of the United States
