= DCGS =

DCGS may refer to:

- Dr Challoner's Grammar School, established in England in 1624
- Distributed Common Ground System, US military intelligence system
- Distributed Common Ground System-Army
- Deputy Chief of the General Staff (United Kingdom)
