= 9th Intelligence Squadron =

US Air Force unit

- Active: 1944–1945; 1948–1950;1966–1991; 1991-present
- Country: United States
- Branch: United States Air Force
- Role: Intelligence
- Part of: Air Combat Command; 480th ISR Wing; 548th ISR Group
- Garrison/HQ: Beale AFB, California
- Engagements: European Theater of Operations
- Decorations: Presidential Unit Citation; Air Force Outstanding Unit Award with Combat "V" Device; Air Force Meritorious Unit Award; Air force Outstanding Unit Award; Belgian Fourragère (Note: Awarded for being cited twice in the Order of the Day of the Belgian Army.)

Insignia
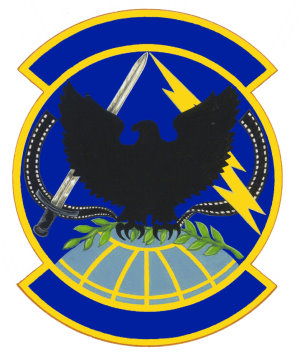
- 9th Intelligence Squadron emblem (approved 1 July 1992)

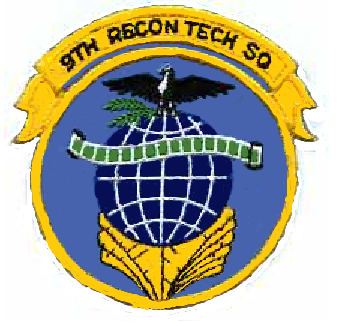
- 9th Reconnaissance Technical Squadron emblem

The United States Air Force's 9th Intelligence Squadron is an intelligence unit located at Beale Air Force Base, California. The 9th is associated with Lockheed U-2 and Distributed Common Ground System operations. The squadron was first active during World War II as the 9th Photographic Technical Unit, serving in the European Theater of Operations.

The 9th Reconnaissance Technical Squadron was active from 1948 through 1950 and again from 1966 through 1991, primarily as the photographic interpretation unit of the 9th Strategic Reconnaissance Wing. It was consolidated with the 9th Photographic Technical Unit in 1985 and the 9th Intelligence Squadron in 2009.

== Mission ==
The 9th operates and maintains the $15M Deployable Shelterized System-Film, the Department of Defense's only mobile film processing capability, as part of the Air Force Distributed Common Ground System architecture. The unit also processes, exploits, and disseminates broad area high-resolution imagery collected by the Lockheed U-2 to meet combatant commander requirements.

== History ==
=== World War II ===
The squadron was first organized in France during the fall of 1944 as the 9th Photographic Laboratory Section. The section provided processing of reconnaissance photography for XXIX Tactical Air Command (Provisional). It continued this mission through V-E Day. It briefly acted as part of the army of occupation, returning to the United States in November 1945, where it was inactivated at the port of embarkation.

=== Strategic reconnaissance support ===
The second predecessor of the squadron was activated in July 1948 as the 12th Photographic Technical Squadron at Topeka Air Force Base, Kansas, where it was assigned to the 311th Air Division, which was the primary reconnaissance headquarters for Strategic Air Command (SAC). In 1949, SAC reorganized its reconnaissance assets, assigning the squadron to the 9th Strategic Reconnaissance Wing and moving it to Fairfield-Suisun Air Force Base, California as the 9th Reconnaissance Technical Squadron.

On 1 April 1950, however, the 9th Wing mission changed from long-range reconnaissance to strategic bombardment. Ten days later, the 9th Squadron moved to Rapid City Air Force Base, South Dakota, where it was assigned to the 28th Strategic Reconnaissance Wing. It was inactivated at the end of the month, with its assets forming the cadre for the 28th Reconnaissance Technical Squadron.

The squadron was again organized in late June 1966, at Beale Air Force Base, California, where it absorbed the mission, personnel and equipment of the 4203d Reconnaissance Technical Squadron, which was discontinued the same day. The squadron processed reconnaissance products produced by the 9th Strategic Reconnaissance Wing's Lockheed SR-71 Blackbird and, later, Lockheed U-2 Dragon Ladys until inactivating in July 1991.

=== Intelligence ===
The 9th Intelligence Support Squadron was activated at Beale in September 1991, the same day its predecessor was inactivated, assuming much of its mission, equipment, and personnel. The squadron dropped "support" from its name in 2003, and in July 2009, the two squadrons were consolidated.

== Lineage ==
9th Photographic Technical Unit

- Constituted as the 9th Photographic Laboratory Section on 25 August 1944

Activated on 5 September 1944
Redesignated 9th Photographic Technical Unit on 13 October 1944

- Inactivated on 4 October 1945

Consolidated with the 9th Reconnaissance Technical Squadron as the 9th Reconnaissance Technical Squadron on 16 October 1984

9th Reconnaissance Technical Squadron

- Constituted as the 12th Photographic Technical Squadron on 29 June 1948

Activated on 19 July 1948
Redesignated 9th Reconnaissance Technical Squadron on 4 March 1949
Inactivated on 1 May 1950

- Activated on 18 May 1966 (not organized)

Organized on 25 June 1966
Consolidated with the 9th Photographic Technical Unit on 16 October 1984
Inactivated on 1 September 1991
Consolidated with the 9th Intelligence Squadron as the 9th Intelligence Squadron on 21 July 2009

9th Intelligence Squadron

- Constituted as the 9th Intelligence Support Squadron on 29 August 1991

Activated on 1 September 1991
Redesignated 9 Intelligence Squadron on 9 January 2003
Consolidated with the 9th Reconnaissance Technical Squadron on 21 July 2009

=== Assignments ===
- Ninth Air Force, 5 September 1944 (attached to XXIX Tactical Air Command (Provisional) after 5 November 1944)
- IX Fighter Command, 1 December 1944 (attached to XXIX Tactical Air Command (Provisional))
- 363d Tactical Reconnaissance Group, 18 May 1945
- XII Tactical Air Command, 5 August–4 Oct 1945
- 311th Air Division, 19 July 1948
- 9th Strategic Reconnaissance Wing (later 9 Bombardment Wing), 1 June 1949
- 28th Strategic Reconnaissance Wing, 10 April–1 May 1950
- Strategic Air Command, 18 May 1966 (not organized) (Note: During the 1960s, USAF organizations were not assigned personnel or equipment when they were activated. The also had to be organized.)
- 9th Strategic Reconnaissance Wing, 25 June 1966 – 1 September 1991
- 9th Operations Group, 1 September 1991
- 548th Intelligence Group, 1 December 2003 – present

=== Stations ===
- Chantilly, Oise, France, 5 September 1944
- Le Culot Airfield (Y-10), France [sic], (Note: Le Culot is in Belgium.) 1 December 1944
- Belgium, 16 February 1945 (Note: During this period, the unit's headquarters was located at Verviers, Belgium. Maurer, Combat Units, p. 447)
- Gutersloh-Marienfelde Airfield (Y-99), Germany, 16 April 1945
- Wiesbaden-Erbenheim Airfield (Y-80), Germany, 31 May 1945
- Eschwege Airfield (R-11), Germany, 31 July–26 September 1945
- Boston Port of Embarkation, Massachusetts, 3-4 October 1945 (Note: Most units inactivated at the Boston Port of Embarkation in 1945 were at Camp Myles Standish)
- Topeka Air Force Base, Kansas, 19 July 1948
- Fairfield-Suisun Air Force Base, California, 1 June 1949
- Rapid City Air Force Base, South Dakota, 10 April–1 May 1950
- Beale Air Force Base, California, 25 June 1966 – 1 September 1991
- Beale Air Force Base, California, 1 Sep 1991 – present
