= 548th Intelligence, Surveillance and Reconnaissance Group =

548th Intelligence, Surveillance and Reconnaissance Group
- Active: 1967-1991, 1992-1994; 2003-present
- Country: United States
- Branch: United States Air Force
- Role: Intelligence
- Part of: Air Combat Command
- Garrison/HQ: Beale Air Force Base, California
- Engagements: Southwest Pacific Theater
- Decorations: Air Force Meritorious Unit Award; Air Force Outstanding Unit Award

Insignia
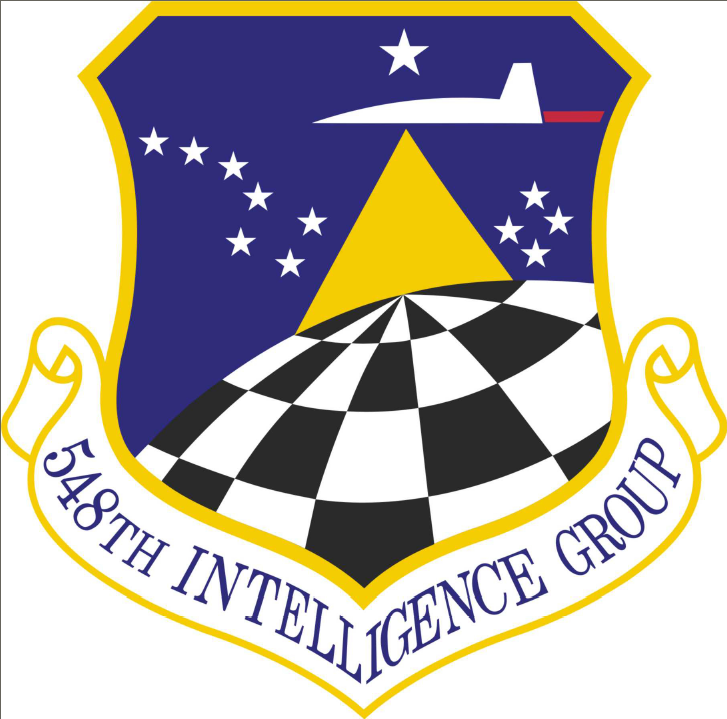
- 548th Intelligence, Surveillance and Reconnaissance Group emblem (Approved 11 December 1968)

The United States Air Force's 548th Intelligence, Surveillance and Reconnaissance Group is an intelligence unit located at Beale AFB, California.

The group was first activated as the 6th Photographic Technical Squadron in November 1943. After training in the United States, it deployed to the Southwest Pacific Theater, serving in the Pacific until VJ Day. After the end of World War II the squadron remained in the Far East, serving in the occupation forces in Japan. It was still in Japan as the 548th Reconnaissance Technical Squadron, when the Korean War began in June 1950. It supported reconnaissance units in Japan until inactivated in 1960.

The squadron was activated to support Pacific Air Forces at Hickam Air Force Base in October 1965. As the Vietnam War increased the need for photographic interpretation, it expanded to become a group two years later. The 548th continued to serve in the Pacific until inactivating in 1992.

As the 548th Air Intelligence Group the unit was activated in August 1992, supporting Air Combat Command intelligence requirements until October 1994 when it was again inactivated. Its most recent activation at Beale Air Force Base took place in October 2003.

== Mission ==
The mission of the 548 ISRG is to operate and maintain a $1B AN/GSQ-272 "Sentinel" weapon system (also known as Distributed Ground Station or DGS), and provide combatant commanders with processing, exploitation, and dissemination (PED) of actionable intelligence data collected by U-2, MQ-1, MQ-9 and RQ-4 aircraft and other platforms as required.

== History ==
The group was first activated in November 1943 as the 6th Photographic Technical Squadron.

== Lineage ==
- Constituted as the 6th Photographic Technical Squadron on 20 November 1943

Activated on 1 Dec 1943

- Redesignated 548 Reconnaissance Technical Squadron on 7 January 1950

Discontinued on 8 March 1960
Organized on 8 October 1965

- Redesignated 548th Reconnaissance Technical Group on 1 October 1967

Inactivated on 3 July 1991

- Redesignated 548th Air Intelligence Group on 1 August 1992

Activated on 27 August 1992
Inactivated on 1 October 1994

- Redesignated 548th Intelligence Group on 23 October 2003

Activated on 1 December 2003

- Redesignated 548th Intelligence, surveillance and Reconnaissance Group on 1 January 2009

=== Assignments ===
- III Reconnaissance Command, 1 December 1943
- Thirteenth Air Force, 13 May 1944
- 91st Reconnaissance Wing, 10 November 1945
- Pacific Air Command, US Army (later Far East Air Forces), 27 January 1946
- Fifth Air Force, 5 January 1950
- Far East Air Forces, 18 February 1950
- Japanese Air Defense Force, 1 May 1952
- 6007th Composite Reconnaissance Group (later 6007th Reconnaissance Group, 11 August 1954
- Far East Air Forces, 2 April 1955
- 6007th Reconnaissance Group, 1 July 1955
- Fifth Air Force, 1 July 1957
- 67th Tactical Reconnaissance Wing, 1 October 1957 – 8 March 1960
- Pacific Air Forces, 30 June 1965 – 3 July 1991
- Air Combat Command, 27 August 1992
- Second Air Force, 1 October 1992
- Twelfth Air Force, 1 July 1993 – 1 October 1994
- 480th Intelligence Wing (later 480th Intelligence, Surveillance and Intelligence Wing), 1 December 2003 – present

== Components ==
- 9th Intelligence Squadron (Dec 2003 - Present)
- 13th Intelligence Squadron (Dec 2003 - Present)
- 48th Intelligence Support Squadron (Dec 2003 - Present)
- 553d Intelligence Squadron (Jun 2022 - Present)

== Stations ==
- Will Rogers Field, Oklahoma, 1 December 1943 – 11 April 1944
- Guadalcanal, Solomon Islands, 13 May - 28 November 1944
- Morotai, Philippines, 12 December 1944
- Camp Dulag, Leyte, Philippines, 30 September 1945
- Fort William McKinley, Luzon, Philippines, 22 November 1945
- Tokyo, Japan, 17 May 1946
- Yokota Army Air Base (later Yokota Air Base), Japan, September 1946
- Showa Air Station, Japan, 30 June 1958
- Yokota Air Base, Japan, 6–8 March 1960
- Hickam Air Force Base, Hawaii, 8 October 1965 – 3 December 1991
- Langley Air Force Base, Virginia, 27 August 1992 – 1 October 1994
- Beale Air Force Base, California, 1 December 2003 – present

== Awards and campaigns ==
Award streamer	Award	Dates	Notes
	Air Force Meritorious Unit Award	1 June 2004-31 May 2006	548th Intelligence Group
	Air Force Meritorious Unit Award	1 June 2006-31 May 2007	548th Intelligence Group
	Air Force Outstanding Unit Award	27 June 1950-10 April 1951	548th Reconnaissance Technical Squadron
	Air Force Outstanding Unit Award	11 April 1951-26 November 1954	548th Reconnaissance Technical Squadron
	Air Force Outstanding Unit Award	14 October 1954-30 June 1956	548th Reconnaissance Technical Squadron
	Air Force Outstanding Unit Award	23 January 1968-25 March 1968	548th Reconnaissance Technical Group
	Air Force Outstanding Unit Award	30 March 1972-15 August 1972	548th Reconnaissance Technical Group
	Air Force Outstanding Unit Award	1 February 1974-31 May 1975	548th Reconnaissance Technical Group
	Air Force Outstanding Unit Award	1 July 1978-30 June 1980	548th Reconnaissance Technical Group
	Air Force Outstanding Unit Award	1 June 1986-31 May 1988	548th Reconnaissance Technical Group
	Air Force Outstanding Unit Award	1 April 1989-31 March 1991	548th Reconnaissance Technical Group
	Air Force Outstanding Unit Award	1 January 1993-30 September 1994	548th Air Intelligence Group
	Air Force Outstanding Unit Award	1 June 2007-31 May 2009	548th Intelligence Group

Campaign Streamer	Campaign	Dates	Notes
	New Guinea	13 May 1943 – 31 December 1944	6th Photographic Technical Squadron
	World War II Army of Occupation (Japan)	17 May 1946 – 27 April 1952	6th Photographic Technical Squadron (later 548th Reconnaissance Technical Squadron)
	Korean Service Medal without inscription	27 June 1950 – 27 July 1853	548th Reconnaissance Technical Squadron
