= 451st Intelligence Squadron =

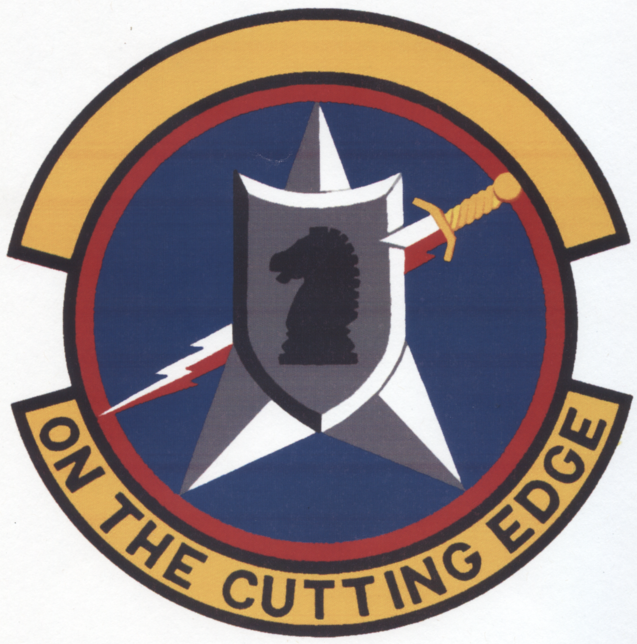
- Emblem
- Active: 1949-55; 1991-2015; 2019-Present
- Country: United States
- Branch: United States Air Force
- Type: Intelligence
- Part of: AFISRA/480th ISR Wing
- Garrison/HQ: Fort Gordon, Georgia
- Motto: "On The Cutting Edge"
- Decorations: AFOUA

Commanders
- Current commander: Lt. Col. Jeremiah Johnson

The United States Air Force's 451st Intelligence Squadron is an intelligence unit located at Fort Gordon, Georgia. The 451st IS was previously inactivated at RAF Menwith Hill, UK, in 2015. The squadron descends from the 10th Radio Squadron, which was activated at Brooks Air Force Base and was active between November 1949 and October 1950.

The squadron was reactivated twice, firstly in 1991, when it was consolidated with the 6951st Electronic Security Squadron, later becoming the 451st until it was inactivated in 2015 The 451st IS was previously inactivated at RAF Menwith Hill, UK, in 2015. It was then reactivated in 2019 when it was it was assigned to the 480th Intelligence, Surveillance and Reconnaissance Group.

== Mission ==
The 451st IS was again activated in 2019 "in order to conduct and execute Air Force and national analysis and reporting capabilities using tactical and national resources to provide intelligence products for U.S. Central Command, U.S. European Command and U.S. Southern Command operations, plans and forces, and the execution of Air Force national and tactical integration operations."

== History ==
The 451st IS' lineage descends from the 10th Radio Squadron, Mobile, activated at Brooks Air Force Base, Texas, Nov. 23, 1949 through Oct. 21, 1950. It was reconstituted and consolidated with the 6951st Electronic Security Squadron, May 1, 1991, at Royal Air Force Menwith Hill Station, United Kingdom, and later became the 451st IS until inactivation, June 24, 2015.

The 451st IS was previously subordinate to the 544th Intelligence, Surveillance and Reconnaissance Group, until the squadron was stood down in 2015. Upon its reactivation in 2019, it was assigned to the 480th Intelligence, Surveillance and Reconnaissance Group.

== Previous designations ==
- 451st Intelligence Squadron (1 April 2007 – 24 June 2015; 11 July 2019 – Present)
- 451st Information Operations Squadron (1 October 2000 – 1 April 2007)
- 451st Intelligence Squadron (1 October 1993 – 1 October 2000)
- 6951st Electronic Security Squadron (1 May 1991 – 1 October 1993)
- 10th Radio Squadron, Mobile (9 November 1949 – 8 May 1955)

== Bases stationed ==
- Fort Gordon, Georgia (11 July 2019 – Present)
- RAF Menwith Hill, United Kingdom (1 May 1991 – 2015)
- RAF Chicksands, United Kingdom (??)
- Southampton, United Kingdom (??)
- Brooks AFB, Texas (23 November 1949 – 21 October 1950)

== Decorations ==
- Air Force Outstanding Unit Award
  - 1 June 2003 – 31 May 2005
  - 1 June 2002 – 31 May 2003 (with Valor device)
  - 1 October 1994 – 30 September 1995
  - 1 October 1993 – 30 September 1994
