= 13th Intelligence Squadron =

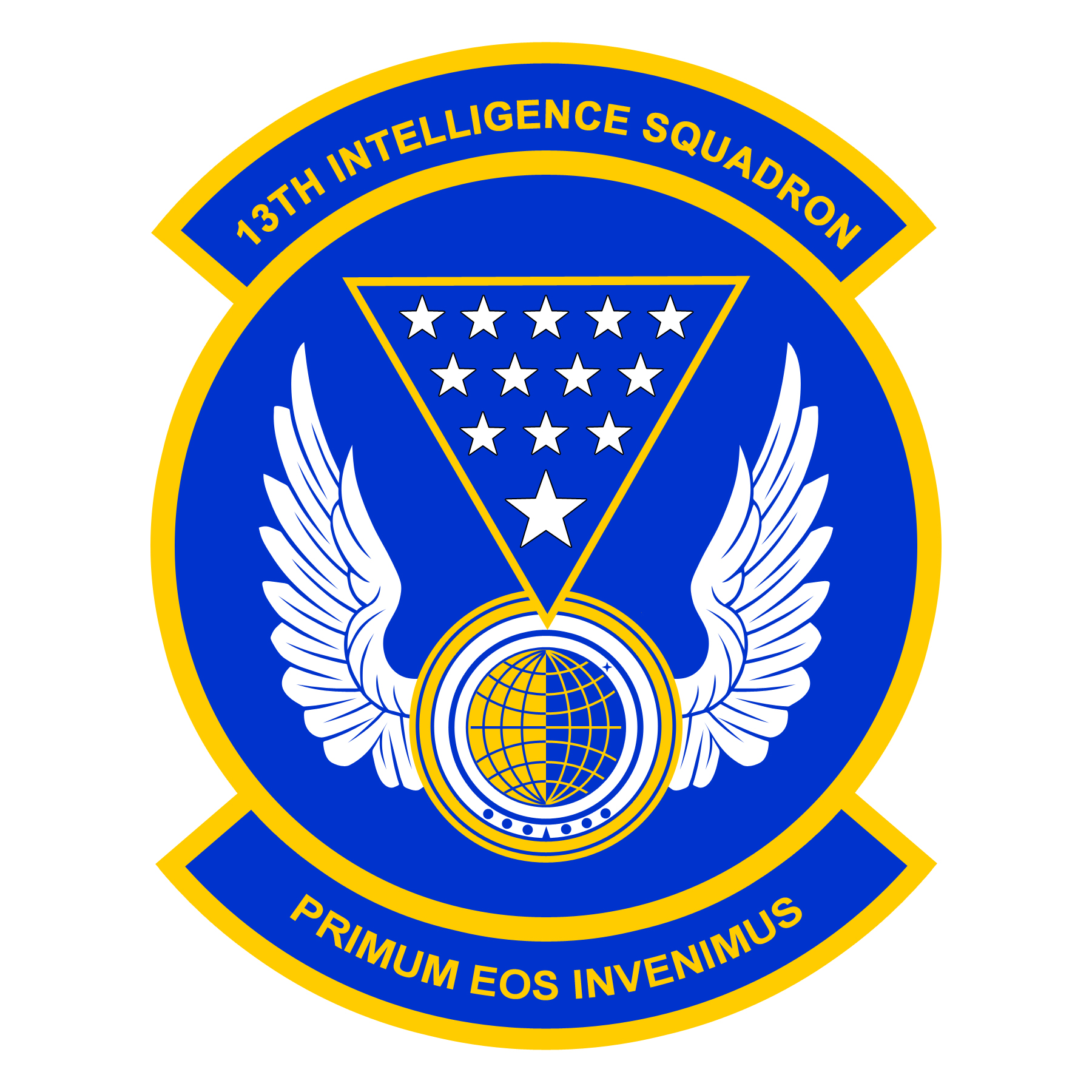
- 13th Intelligence Squadron Patch
- Country: US
- Branch: United States Air Force
- Type: Reconnaissance and Surveillance
- Part of: 25th Air Force; 480th ISR Wing; 548th ISR Group
- Garrison/HQ: Beale Air Force Base
- Motto: Primum Eos Videmus
- Decorations: Presidential Unit Citation; Meritorious Unit Award; Air Force Outstanding Unit Award; Republic of Vietnam Gallantry Cross with Palm

The 13th Intelligence Squadron (13 IS) is part of the 548th Intelligence Group at Beale Air Force Base. It is one of the exploitation units for the Lockheed U-2 (operated out of Beale AFB), MQ-1 Predator and MQ-9 Reaper (operated out of Nellis, NV) and RQ-4 Global Hawk (operated by the 12th Reconnaissance Squadron, also at Beale AFB) unmanned aircraft conducting reconnaissance and surveillance missions.

== Mission ==
The mission of the 13 IS is to operate Distributed Ground Station-2 (DGS-2), and conduct exploitation of intelligence data collected by the U-2 and Global Hawk and Predator unmanned aerial vehicles, while providing actionable, multisource combat intelligence to combatant commanders.

== History ==
Activated in 1994, the 13th has exploited intelligence from the deployable, long-endurance RQ-4 Global Hawk (which is operated by the 12th Reconnaissance Squadron to fulfill training and operational requirements generated by the Joint Chiefs of Staff in support of unified commanders and the Secretary of Defense).

=== Organization ===
The 13th Intelligence Squadron's history dates to the Second World War. Originally constituted on 1 February 1945, as the 13th Photographic Technical Unit at Maastricht, the Netherlands, in April 1945, the unit reported to France. In May 1945 following allied advances, the 13th reported to Germany where it was assigned to the 363rd Tactical Reconnaissance Group. On 20 November 1945, at the close of World War II, the 13th was inactivated.

The unit was reactivated as the 13th Reconnaissance Technical Squadron on 10 April 1963 at Ton Son Nhut Airfield, Republic of Vietnam. The 13th conducted tactical reconnaissance photo-processing and exploitation focused on Vietnam. On 15 June 1967, the unit moved to Clark Air Base, Philippines until it was again inactivated on 15 June 1971.

In 1992, the 548th Air Intelligence Group (AIG), Detachment 1 was activated at Beale Air Force Base, California to prepare a site for the Contingency Airborne Reconnaissance System (CARS), Deployable Ground Station Two (DGS-2). On 29 September 1994, the 548th AIG, Det 1 was re-designated the 13th Intelligence Squadron. At that point, the unit was charged with conducting near-real-time imagery exploitation and all-source analysis of U-2 derived intelligence. Using state-of-the-art ground and satellite relays, DGS-2 crews pioneered the practice of "reach-back" collection, using sensors on board a U-2 aircraft operating half-way around the world as if they were virtually on board the aircraft.

In August 1995, the 13th IS, as part of DGS-2, supported Operation DELIBERATE FORCE, a brief NATO air campaign in the former Yugoslav republic of Bosnia-Herzegovina. In November 1995, DGS-2 participated in Operation JOINT GUARDIAN supporting multi-national peacekeeping forces in Bosnia-Herzegovina. Because of its outstanding performance, completing over 450 successful missions, the 13th Intelligence Squadron was awarded the Director of the Central Intelligence Agency's National Intelligence Meritorious Unit Citation for 1996 and 1997.

In January 1998, the 13th IS conducted the first Joint Chiefs of Staff operational tasking utilizing the Extended Tether Program (ETP) architecture. ETP provided DGS-2 with a worldwide, quickly deployable two-way satellite link to the U-2 aircraft. The operation, known as Operation BITTER DISTANT, was a counter-drug operation in the USSOUTHCOM area of operations.

In October 1998, DGS-2 began round-the-clock surveillance and reconnaissance operations to monitor the deteriorating situation in Kosovo. On 24 March 1999, NATO-led Operation ALLIED FORCE was launched with the aim of expelling Serbian forces from the province of Kosovo. DGS-2 participated in this operation for its duration, supporting 190 U-2 sorties over 78 days. In addition, DGS-2 conducted processing, exploitation, and dissemination for the Predator unmanned aerial vehicle (UAV) during the first combat employment of a UAV to laser designate targets for precision-guided munitions. DGS-2 is credited with the destruction of 39 SAM systems and 28 aircraft during this operation.

=== Operations ===
- World War II
- Vietnam
- Bosnia-Herzegovina
- Kosovo

== Awards and decorations ==
Presidential Unit Citation with 2 Oak Leaf Clusters

- 31 May 1944 – 30 Jun 1944
- 22 Feb 1945 – 23 Feb 1945
- 18 Feb 1966 – 12 Oct 1966

Meritorious Unit Award with 1 Oak Leaf Cluster

- 1 Jun 2004 – 31 May 2006
- 1 Jun 2006 – 31 May 2007

Air Force Outstanding Unit Award with Valor and 8 Oak Leaf Clusters

- 1 Jan 1965 – 30 Nov 1965 (with Valor)
- 1 Jan 1993 – 31 Dec 1994
- 1 Jun 1996 – 31 May 1998
- 1 Jun 1998 – 31 May 2000
- 1 Jun 2000 – 31 May 2001
- 1 Jun 2002 – 31 May 2003 (with Valor)
- 1 Jun 2007 – 31 May 2009
- 1 Jun 2009 – 31 May 2011
- 1 Jun 2011 – 31 Dec 2012
- 1 Jan 2013 – 31 Dec 2013

Republic of Vietnam Gallantry Cross with Palm Unit Citation

- 1 Apr 1966 – 31 Mar 1968
