= 48th Intelligence Support Squadron =

48th Intelligence Support Squadron
- Active: 1963–1994; 1994–present
- Country: United States
- Branch: United States Air Force
- Role: Intelligence support
- Part of: Air Combat Command
- Garrison/HQ: Beale Air Force Base, California
- Engagements: Kosovo War; War on terrorism
- Decorations: Air Force Outstanding Unit Award with Combat "V" Device air Force Meritorious Unit Award; Air Force Outstanding Unit Award

Insignia
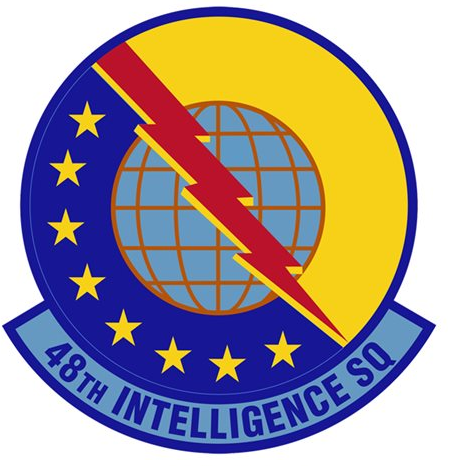
- 48 Intelligence Sq emblem

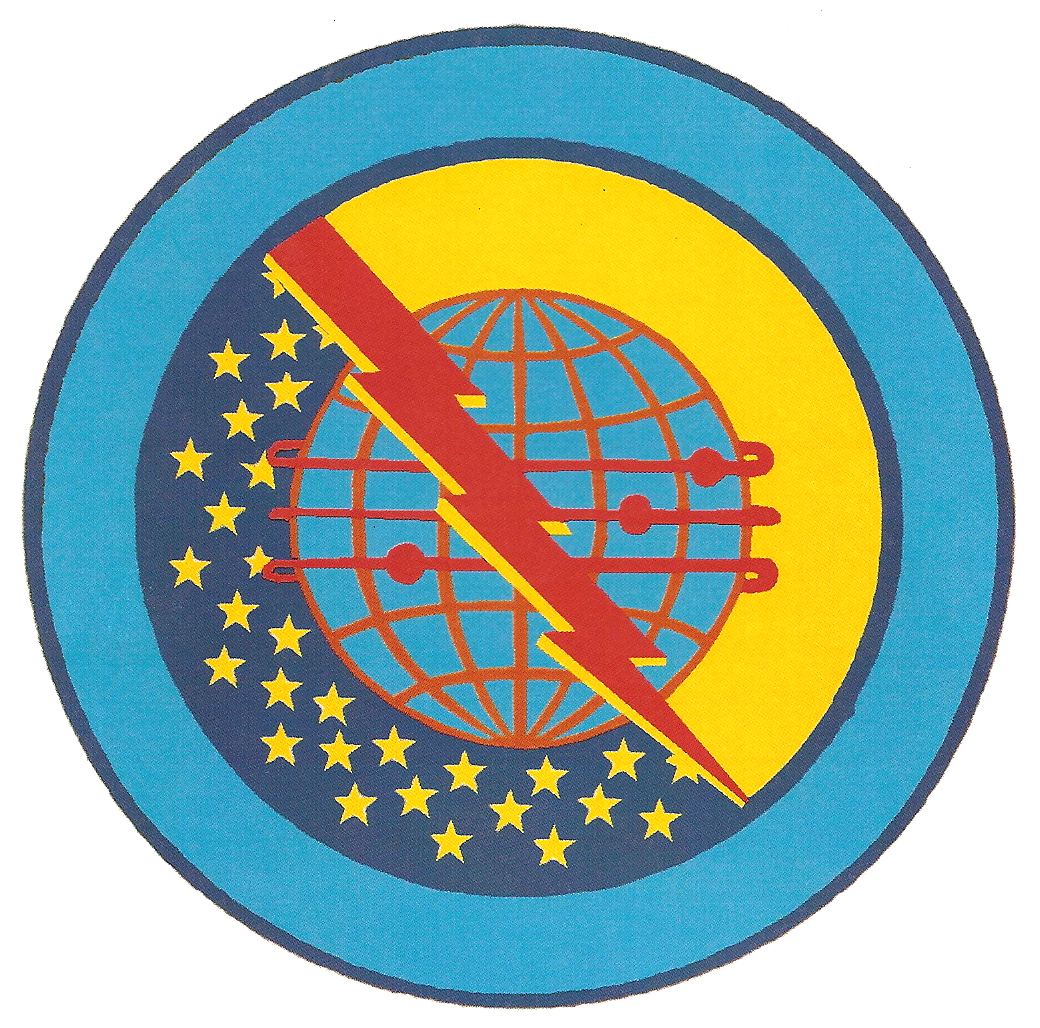
- 6948th Security Squadron emblem

The United States Air Force's 48th Intelligence Support Squadron is an intelligence support unit located at Beale AFB, California. The squadron is associated with Lockheed U-2 operations.

== Mission ==
The 48th Information Support Squadron provides in-garrison and deployed communications and logistics maintenance for the DGS-2 and Deployable Shelterized System-Film (DSS-F) elements of the AN/GSQ-272 SENTINEL (also known as the Distributed Common Ground System, or DCGS). The unit also ensures multisource intelligence from U-2, MQ-1 Predator, General Atomics MQ-9 Reaper, and Global Hawk aircraft is exploited in real-time and sent to combatant commanders and warfighting forces.

The unit's emblem was approved on 4 October 2018.

As of 2022, the unit has a campaign streamer for the Kosovo Air Campaign, and a service streamer, Global War on Terror - Service.

== Lineage ==
- Designated as the 6948 Security Squadron (Mobile) and organized on 1 July 1963

Redesignated 6948th Electronic Security Squadron on 1 August 1979
Redesignated 48th Intelligence Squadron on 1 October 1993
Inactivated on 30 September 1994

- Activated on 30 November 1994

Redesignated 48th Intelligence Support Squadron on 1 July 2022

=== Assignments ===
- 6940th Security Wing, 1 July 1963
- 6955th Security Group, 1 July 1974
- United States Air Force Security Service (later Electronic Security Command), 15 May 1975
- 6960th Electronic Security Wing (later Continental Electronic Security Division), 1 July 1980
- 695th Electronic Security Wing, 3 October 1988
- Continental Electronic Security Division, 1 January 1991
- 693d Intelligence Wing, 1 October 1991
- 67th Intelligence Group, 1 October 1993 – 30 September 1994
- 67th Intelligence Group, 30 November 1994
- 480th Intelligence Group, 31 January 2000
- 548th Intelligence Group (later 548th Intelligence, Surveillance and Reconnaissance Group), 1 December 2003 – present

=== Stations ===
- Goodfellow Air Force Base, Texas, 1 July 1963
- Kelly Air Force Base, Texas, 1 August 1973 – 30 September 1994
- Beale Air Force Base, California, 30 November 1994 – present

== Decorations ==
- Air Force Outstanding Unit Award
  - 1 Sep 1991 – 30 Jun 1993
  - 1 Jul 1993 – 30 Jun 1994
  - 1 Jul 1994 – 30 Jun 1995
  - 1 Jun 1996 – 31 May 1998
