= Ozone Widget Framework =

Open-source web-based framework

The Ozone Widget Framework (OWF) is an open-source web-based framework for composing and integrating lightweight web applications, known as "widgets", into a customisable desktop-like interface called a "webtop". Developed by the U.S. National Security Agency (NSA), it enables decentralised data communication between widgets within a browser, allowing users to assemble tools for tasks like real-time analytics, cyber-situational awareness, and operational planning without sending data back to servers. OWF supports inter-widget communication via intents and channels.

== Background ==
OWF originated as a secure framework for command and control (C2) interfaces within the U.S. Department of Defence (DoD). It was designed to address challenges in net-centric environments, where traditional portals struggled with decentralised content. In 2012, Congress mandated its release as open-source software under the National Defence Authorisation Act, requiring the DoD to publish APIs, toolkits, and source code to encourage commercial development and DoD/intelligence community use.

OWF's code was hosted on GitHub by the Ozone Platform team and released as Government Open Source Software (GOSS). The framework evolved from NSA's Secure Widget Integration Framework (SWIF), incorporating mandatory access control (MAC) for multi-level security.

== Features ==
OWF provides a browser-based webtop where users can:

- Assemble widgets into dashboards or tabbed layouts for personalised workflows.
- Enable inter-widget communication via publish-subscribe channels and intents, allowing data sharing (e.g., a contact list sending addresses to a map widget).
- Implement security through plugin modules for user-specific access, discretionary access control (DAC) at the widget level, and optional MAC for data classification.
- Integrate with APIs like the Common Map Widget API (CMAPI) for standardised map-data interactions.

== Development and community ==
Development focuses on widget creation, with guides for integrating existing apps and adding components like descriptor URLs. The Ozone Platform maintains repositories for OWF, the OZONE Marketplace (a widget search engine), and OZONE Synapse (a data-caching layer).

Community support includes Google Groups for LDAP configuration and announcements, with pull requests encouraged via GitHub. Refactoring efforts in 2013 aimed at OSGi backend and Ext JS removal for scalability.

== Related projects ==
- OZONE Marketplace: A widget discovery catalogue.
- OZONE Synapse: Optional data-query layer for caching.
- Common Map Widget API (CMAPI): Standard for map widget interoperability.
- Esri Ozone Map Widgets: Integration with ArcGIS for defence applications.
- OpenLayers Ozone Widgets: For OGC data visualisation.

== See also ==
- Mashup (web application hybrid)
- National Security Agency
- Open-source software
- Web portal
