= 22nd Photographic Reconnaissance Squadron =

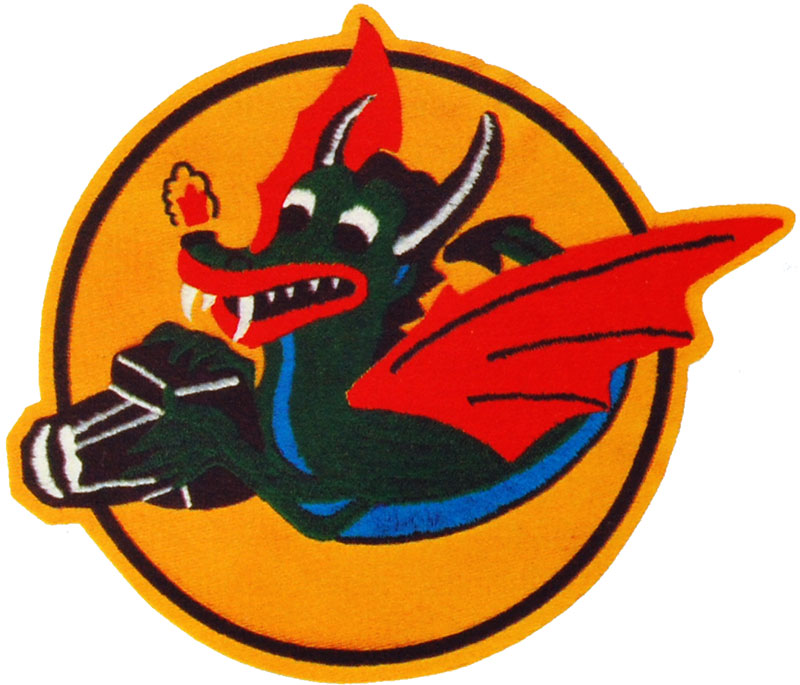
- 22nd Reconnaissance Squadron Patch
- Active: 14 July 1942 – September 1945
- Country: United States
- Branch: United States Army Air Forces
- Type: Reconnaissance and Surveillance
- Part of: Eighth Air Force; 7th Photographic Group
- Engagements: World War II

Aircraft flown
- Reconnaissance: Lockheed F-5 (P-38) Lightning; Lockheed P-38 Lightning (Variants: F-5, F-5A, F-5B, F-5C, and F-5E).

The 22nd Photographic Reconnaissance Squadron was a part of the Eighth Air Force 7th Photographic Group that was activated in 1942 and based at Mount Farm England between 1943 and 1945.

== Peterson Field ==
The unit was constituted by general orders on 14 July 1942 and activated on 2 September 1944 at was later to be known as Peterson Field in Colorado Springs as part of the 5th Photographic Group. The outfit existed essentially on paper until 21 December 1943 when 12 officers and 129 enlisted men were transferred from the 10th Photographic Reconnaissance and Training Squadron. The commanding officer was Capt. George A. Lawson. The Squadron left Colorado Springs on 17 May 1943 and traveled to England aboard the RMS Queen Mary.

== Mount Farm ==
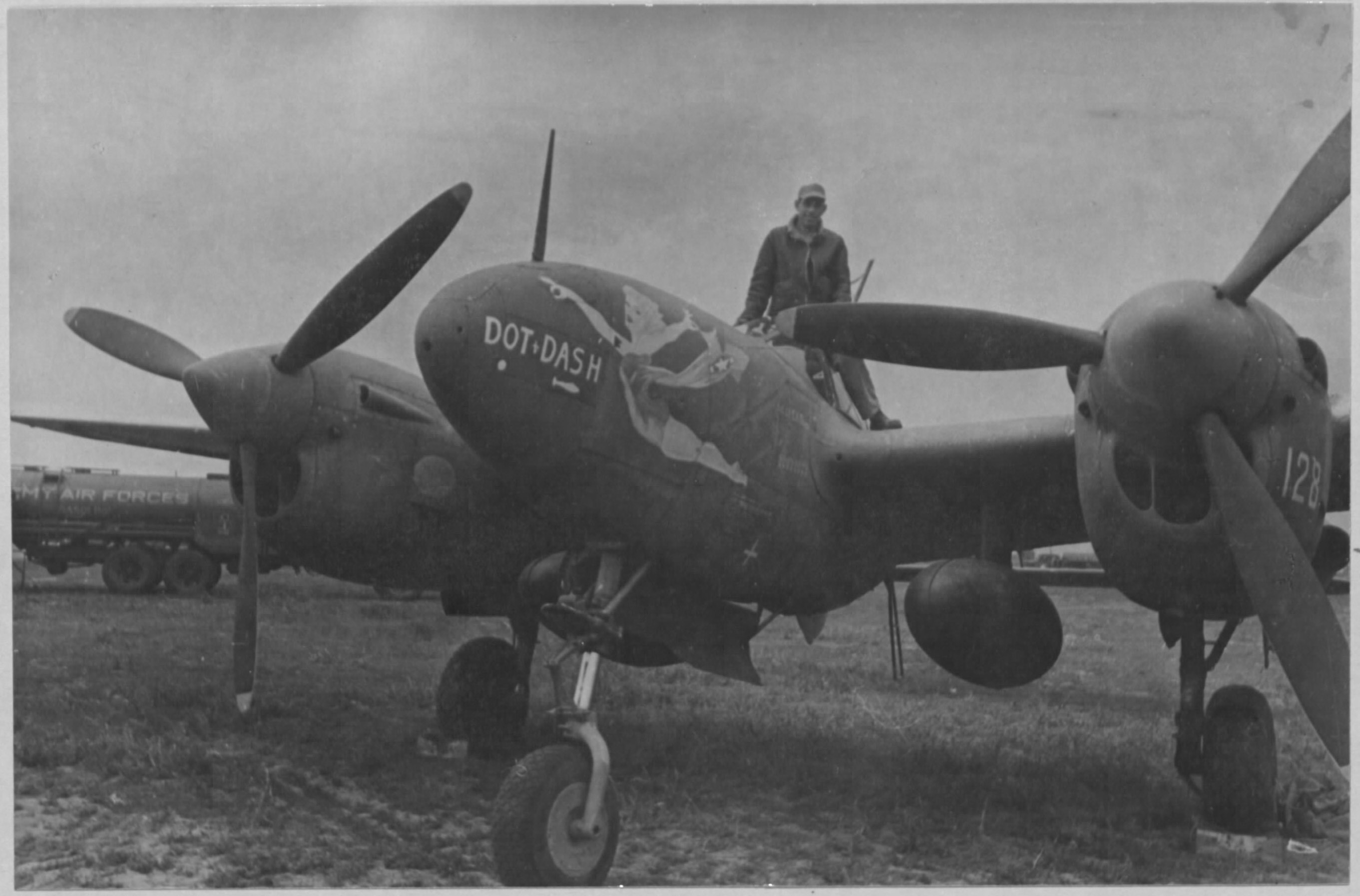
F-5C Lightning 'Dot And Dash' after landing on a shuttle flight to Russia in 1944; this aircraft was shot down 6 October 1944 over IJsselmeer, Netherlands, while assigned to the 22nd.

The Squadron arrived at the RAF Mount Farm airfield on 8 June 1943. The unit was equipped with Lockheed F-5 (P-38) Lightning photographic aircraft and the first mission was flown on 24 June 1943. The 22nd Reconnaissance Squadron was combined with the 13th Photographic Squadron and 14th Photographic Squadron, into the 7th Photographic Reconnaissance and Mapping Group that was activated on 7 July 1943.

In 1943, the 22nd was among the squadrons flying the first photoreconnaissance missions against Peenemünde.

During August and September 1945, personnel were transferred out of the 22nd squadron, some returning to the United States and others assigned to the Occupation Forces in Germany.

== Equipment ==
The squadron used Lockheed P-38 Lightning aircraft photo-reconnaissance variant F-5 throughout the war. The F-5 and F-5A were used from the summer of 1943 until the summer of 1944 when F-5B, F-5C, and F-5E Lightnings were brought in. All P-38 Lightning variants were used for the remainder of the war.

== Notable pilots ==
- John H. Ross
