= Control center =

Control center or Control Center may refer to:

== Physical facilities ==
- Control room, a central space where a large physical facility or physically dispersed service can be monitored and controlled
- Area control center, a type of air traffic control facility
- Mission control center, a facility that manages aerospace vehicle flights
- Missile launch control center or Launch control center, an intercontinental ballistic missile control facility
- NORAD Control Center, a Cold War-era joint command center for USAF and Army Air Defense Commands
- Operations center
- Poison control center, a type of telephone support facility for exposure to poison or hazardous substances
- Rumor control center, a facility designed to communicate accurate information during crises

== Computing ==
- Control Center (Apple), a feature of Apple's iOS mobile operating system
- Control Panel (Windows), a part of the Microsoft Windows graphical user interface
- Switching Control Center System, a 1970s-era telecommunications computer system
