= 27th Intelligence Squadron =

27th Intelligence Squadron

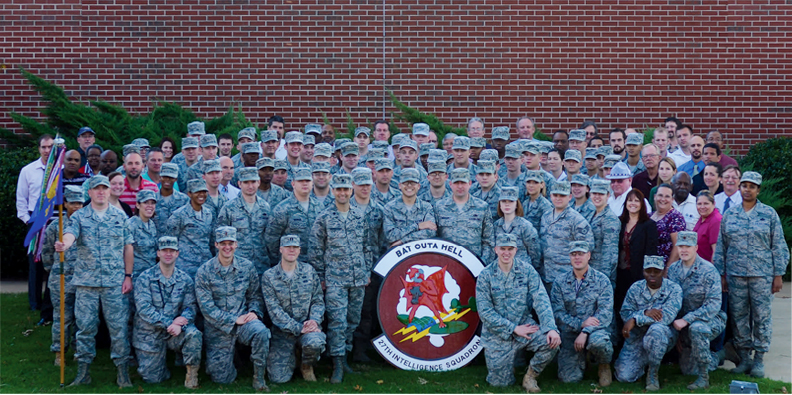
- 27 Intelligence Squadron after winning the Grant Award
- Active: 1943–1945; 1990–present
- Country: United States
- Branch: United States Air Force
- Role: Intelligence
- Size: Approximately 180
- Part of: Sixteenth Air Force
- Garrison/HQ: Langley Air Force Base, Virginia
- Nickname: Bat Outa Hell
- Engagements: European Theater of Operations
- Decorations: Distinguished Unit Citation; Air Force Meritorious Unit Award; Air Force Outstanding Unit Award; Air Force Organizational Excellence Award

Insignia
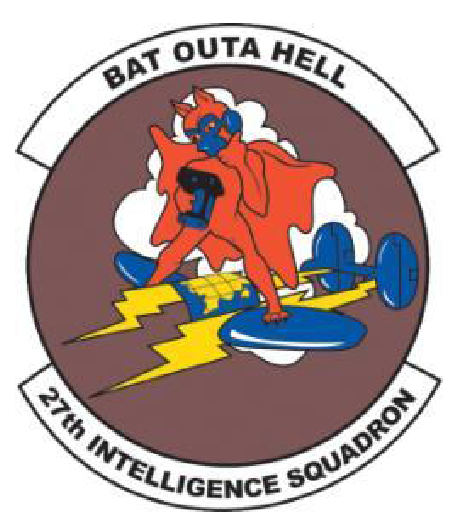
- 27th Intelligence Squadron emblem (Note: Approved 24 August 1944. When the squadron was reactivated as an intelligence unit, all elements were moved inside the disc to comply with AF Directives.)

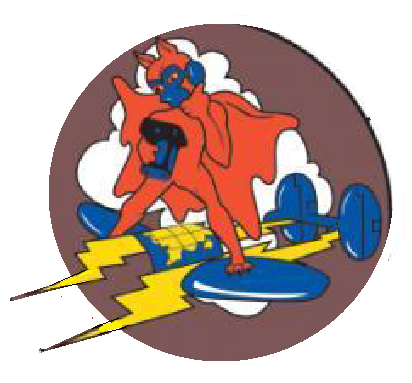
- 27th Photographic Reconnaissance Squadron emblem
- World War II Fuselage Code (Note: For security reasons, the assigned code was not displayed during the war. Afterwards it was applied to the underside of the squadron aircraft' wings, rather than to the fuselage. Watkins, p. 106.): G2

The 27th Intelligence Squadron is an active squadron of the United States Air Force, stationed at Langley Air Force Base, part of Joint Base Langley-Eustis, near Hampton, Virginia. It is assigned to the 497th Intelligence, Surveillance and Reconnaissance Group.

The squadron was first organized in February 1943 as the 27th Photographic Reconnaissance Squadron. After training in the United States, the squadron moved to the European Theater of Operations, where it engaged in combat until V-E Day. It earned a Distinguished Unit Citation for its work during Operation Overlord, the invasion of France, in the spring of 1944. It remained in Europe until late fall of 1945, when it returned to the United States and was inactivated.

== Mission ==
The 27th Intelligence Squadron is currently assigned to the 497th Intelligence, Reconnaissance, and Surveillance Group at Langley AFB, Hampton, Virginia. Its mission is to provide full-spectrum intelligence analysis in support of various Air Force combatant commands' intelligence requirements. It currently employs approximately 200 active duty Air Force personnel, civilians, and contractors.

== History ==
=== World War II ===
The squadron was activated as the 27th Photographic Reconnaissance Squadron at Peterson Field, Colorado in February 1943 and equipped with Lockheed P-38 Lightnings and two reconnaissance models of the Lightning, the F-4 and the F-5. It was one of the original squadrons of the 6th Photographic Group. The squadron trained with the 6th Group until September 1943, when the 6th moved overseas to the Southwest Pacific Theater. The 27th moved overseas in November, but to England, where it was attached to the 7th Photographic Group.

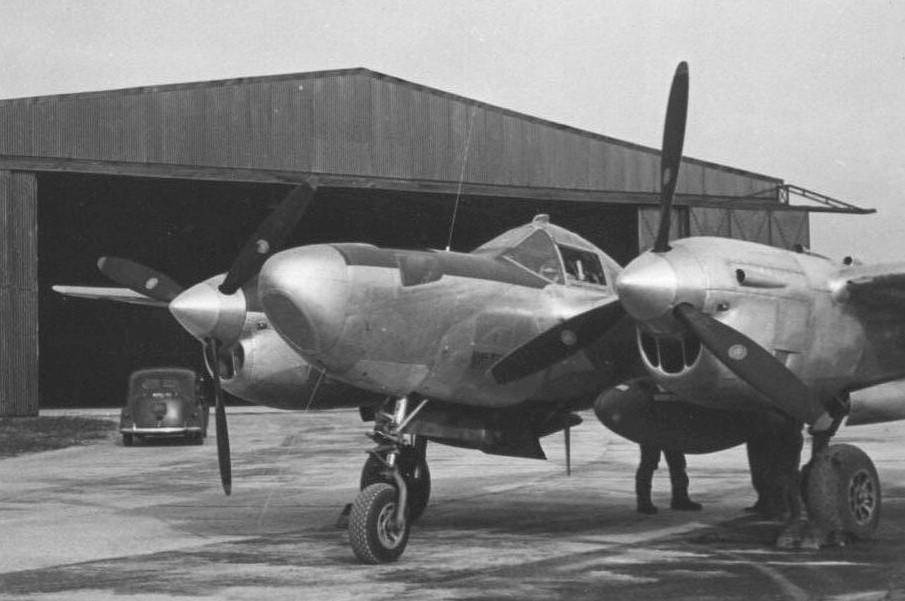
F-5 Lightning at Mount Farm

The squadron flew missions supporting Eighth Air Force's strategic bombing campaign by photographing potential targets and flying over recently struck areas to provide bomb damage assessment. It also provided information on enemy forces disposition and movements. In preparation for Operation Overlord, the invasion of Normandy, the unit concentrated on providing photographic information on airfields, cities, factories and seaports in France, Belgium and the Netherlands. Pre-invasion coverage was extended to the Low Countries to mask the intended invasion location. Its reconnaissance of marshalling yards, canals, highways and other transportation routes contributed to the success of the Normandy campaign, earning the 27th a Distinguished Unit Citation.

In July 1944, the unit provided coverage of launch sites for V-1 flying bombs and V-2 rockets. From late August, the 27th provided coverage for advancing Allied forces. The squadron provided photo coverage for Operation Market Garden, the airborne attacks in the Netherlands. In November the squadron moved to France for closer cooperation with VIII Fighter Command, and flew missions supporting ground forces engaged in the Battle of the Bulge from Denain/Prouvy Airfield. In 1945, as losses mounted among reconnaissance aircraft operating over the Continent, it began to fly North American P-51 Mustangs to provide fighter cover for the 7th Group's unarmed Lightnings. The squadron also flew a few F-6 reconnaissance models of the Mustang. After V-E Day, the squadron participated in the final bomb damage assessment of Germany. Most, if not all, aircraft were disposed of to depots by September, and the squadron returned to the United States in December and was inactivated at Camp Kilmer, New Jersey in December.

=== Intelligence operations ===
The squadron was dormant until September 1990, when it was redesignated the 27th Tactical Intelligence Squadron and activated at Langley Air Force Base, Virginia as part of the 480th Tactical Intelligence Group of Tactical Air Command. In December 2003 the 480th Intelligence Wing was activated to manage the Distributed Common Ground System and the squadron was assigned to it. The Distributed Common Ground System disseminates intelligence information collected by Lockheed U-2 aircraft and General Atomics MQ-1 Predator, Northrop Grumman RQ-4 Global Hawk and General Atomics MQ-9 Reaper unmanned aerial vehicles to combat commanders, no matter what their location may be.

As Distributed Ground System stations became operational, the squadron worked to connect the new stations with the system. This included stations at Hickam Air Force Base in 2004, Langley Air Force Base in 2005, three Air National Guard operated stations in 2006 and a center at Beale Air Force Base in 2011. The squadron also participates in exercises on a regular basis.

In 2013, the squadron won the Lt. Gen. Harold W. Grant information dominance award as the best small communications and information unit in the Air Force. The award was made for the squadron's "sustained superior performance and professional excellence while managing core cyberspace and information dominance functions and for contributions that most improved Air Force Department of Defense operations and missions." This award was followed by earning the Chief Master Sgt. James C. Swindell award for having the best communications and information systems operation in Twenty-Fifth Air Force from 1 September 2013 through 31 August 2014.

== Lineage ==
- Constituted as the 27th Photographic Reconnaissance Squadron on 5 February 1943
- Redesignated 27th Photographic Squadron (Light) on 5 February 1943

Activated on 9 February 1943

- Redesignated 27th Photographic Reconnaissance Squadron on 11 August 1943

Inactivated on 21 December 1945

- Redesignated 27th Tactical Intelligence Squadron on 1 September 1990 and activated
- Redesignated 27th Air Intelligence Squadron on 1 November 1991
- Redesignated 27th Intelligence Squadron on 1 October 1993
- Redesignated 27th Intelligence Support Squadron on 1 December 2003
- Redesignated 27th Intelligence Squadron on 1 January 2009

=== Assignments ===
- 6th Photographic Group (later 6th Photographic Reconnaissance and Mapping Group, 6th Photographic Reconnaissance Group), 9 February 1943
- Third Air Force, 9 October 1943
- III Reconnaissance Command, 12 October 1943
- 7th Photographic Reconnaissance and Mapping Group (later 7th Photographic Group, 7th Reconnaissance Group), (attached c. 4 November 1943) 9 December 1943 – 21 November 1945 (attached to VIII Air Force Service Command 9 November 1944, VIII Air Force Fighter Command, 26 January – 22 April 1945)
- Unknown 21 November 1945 – 21 December 1945 (Note: Neither Lent nor Maurer list an assignment for the squadron after the 7th Group was inactivated in November. Its probable assignments were VIII Fighter Command until leaving England, and Army Service Forces, Port of Embarkation upon arrival in the United States.)
- 480th Tactical Intelligence Group (later 480th Air Intelligence Group, 480th Intelligence Group), 1 September 1990
- 480th Intelligence Wing (later 480th Intelligence, Surveillance and Reconnaissance Wing), 1 December 2003 – present

=== Stations ===
- Peterson Field, Colorado, 9 February 1943
- RAF Mount Farm (Station 234), England, 4 November 1943
- Denain/Prouvy Airfield (A-83), France, 9 November 1944
- RAF Chalgrove (Station 465), England, 29 April 1945
- Frankfurt-Eschborn Airfield 14 October 1945
- Poix, France, 15 October 1945 – 26 November 1945
- Camp Kilmer, New Jersey, 20 – 21 December 1945
- Langley Air Force Base (later Joint Base Langley-Eustis), 1 September 1990 – present

=== Aircraft ===
- Lockheed F-4 Lightning, 1943
- Lockheed F-5 Lightning, 1943–1945
- North American F-6 Mustang, 1945
- Lockheed P-38 Lightning, 1943–1945
- North American P-51 Mustang, 1945

=== Awards and campaigns ===
Award streamer	Award	Dates	Notes
	Distinguished Unit Citation	31 May 1944 – 30 June 1944	27th Photographic Reconnaissance Squadron
	Air Force Meritorious Unit Award	1 June 2004 – 31 May 2006	27th Intelligence Support Squadron
	Air Force Meritorious Unit Award	1 June 2006 – 31 May 2007	27th Intelligence Support Squadron
	Air Force Outstanding Unit Award w/Combat "V" Device	1 June 2002 – 31 May 2003	27th Intelligence Squadron
	Air Force Outstanding Unit Award	1 September 1990 – 31 December 1991	27th Tactical Intelligence Squadron (later 27th Air Intelligence Squadron)
	Air Force Outstanding Unit Award	1 January 1992 – 30 September 1993	27th Air Intelligence Squadron
	Air Force Outstanding Unit Award	1 October 1999 – 30 September 2000	27th Intelligence Squadron
	Air Force Outstanding Unit Award	1 June 2007 – 31 May 2009	27th Intelligence Support Squadron (later 27th Intelligence Squadron)
	Air Force Organizational Excellence Award	1 October 1993 – 30 September 1995	27th Intelligence Squadron

Campaign Streamer	Campaign	Dates	Notes
	Air Offensive, Europe	4 November 1943 – 5 June 1944	27th Photographic Reconnaissance Squadron
	Normandy	6 June 1944 – 24 July 1944	27th Photographic Reconnaissance Squadron
	Northern France	25 July 1944 – 14 September 1944	27th Photographic Reconnaissance Squadron
	Rhineland	15 September 1944 – 21 March 1945	27th Photographic Reconnaissance Squadron
	Ardennes-Alsace	16 December 1944 – 25 January 1945	27th Photographic Reconnaissance Squadron
	Central Europe	22 March 1944 – 21 May 1945	27th Photographic Reconnaissance Squadron
	Air Combat, EAME Theater	4 November 1943 – 11 May 1945	27th Photographic Reconnaissance Squadron

== See also ==
- List of United States Air Force squadrons
