= 301 Squadron =

301 Squadron or 301st Squadron may refer to:

== United States ==
- 301st Air Refueling Squadron
- 301st Airlift Squadron
- 301st Bombardment Squadron
- 301st Fighter Squadron
- 301st Intelligence Squadron
- 301st Rescue Squadron

== Other counties ==
- No. 301 Polish Bomber Squadron, a World War II unit of the Polish Air Forces in Great Britain
- 301st Tactical Fighter Squadron (JASDF), Japan
- 301 Squadron (Portugal)
