= Spitfire 944 =

Spitfire 944 Festival Poster

Spitfire 944 is a short documentary in which the 83-year-old World War II pilot John S. Blyth views 16mm footage of his 1944 Spitfire crash-landing for the first time, 61 years after the event.

== Behind the scenes ==
In October 2005, the filmmaker William Lorton inherited two suitcases of 16mm home movies which his great uncle, James R. Savage, MD., shot while serving as a flight surgeon for the US Army Air Corps during World War II. The most compelling shot in the three hours of war footage was the crash landing of a Spitfire Mk XI fighter plane at RAF Mount Farm in Great Britain. Being the flight surgeon at the base, Captain Savage was alerted to the impending accident and had the presence of mind to bring his movie camera to the landing strip.

Within 30 seconds of entering the Spitfire's tail number into Google, the filmmaker was able to ascertain the date and location of the crash and the name of the pilot: John S. Blyth.

Lorton sent a letter to LtCol. Blyth requesting a general interview about World War II aviation and received a positive response. He did not reveal the existence of the 16mm footage until the interview took place about two weeks later near Tacoma, Washington. At the end of a three-hour interview about the pilot's war exploits, Lorton asked Blyth to review "about one minute" of footage. Blyth was quite surprised to suddenly be watching his death-defying landing of 61 years earlier.

== Critical dimensions ==
Lorton's object was to capture what it looks like when a man is unexpectedly confronted with a motion picture of the most dangerous moment in his life, which took place during a major historical event, before the proliferation of consumer video cameras. Blyth and his family later commented that his "Spitfire Crash-Landing" story had been told so many times, some considered it a "tall tale". No longer.

The film is complex in that it is a photographic record of a man reviewing a photographic record of his own photographic record-making process (a wartime photo-reconnaissance flight) across a timespan of 61 years. The film includes several high-altitude reconnaissance photos actually taken by Blyth.

== Historical context ==
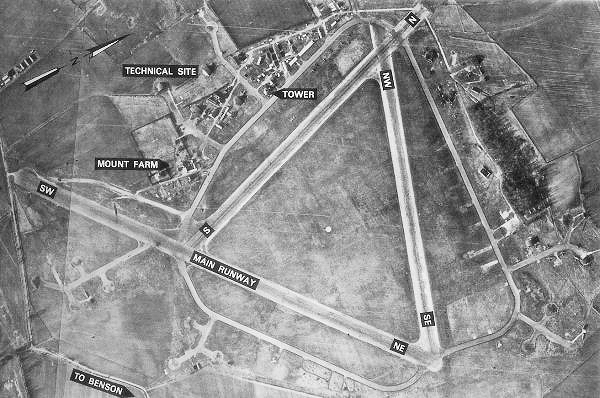
RAF Mount Farm in 1946

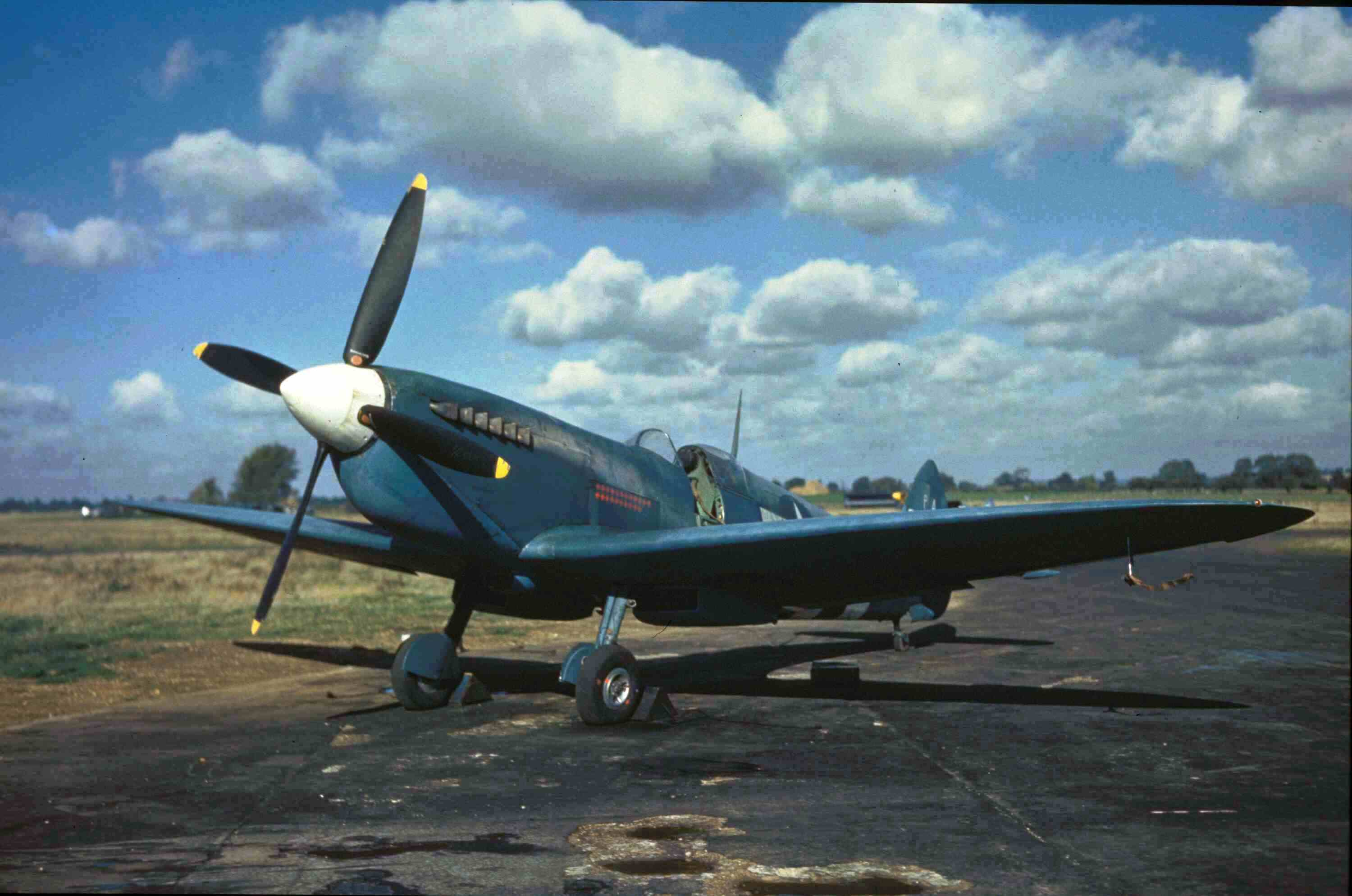
Spitfire PR Mk XI PA944 of the 7th Photographic Reconnaissance Group at RAF Mount Farm

Lieutenant Blyth was flying with the United States Army Air Corps' 14th Photographic Reconnaissance Squadron based at RAF Mount Farm, UK. He began the war flying a Lockheed P-38 Lightning variant modified for photo reconnaissance work (United States Army Air Corps designation "F-5"). His unit soon switched to the British Spitfire Mk XI, which was better suited to high-altitude, low-temperature flight conditions than the American planes.

This was not Blyth's first crash. On 31 October 1943, he was forced to return to base because of equipment problems and haze. He attempted to land at RAF Thame, failed to stop in time and had accident.

== Articles in the media ==
- Soren Andersen, "Love for Spitfire Served Pilot Well", Tacoma News Tribune, 29 March 2007
- Anthony Breznican, "Scenes from Sundance", USA Today, 29 January 2007
- Chris De Benedetti, "Bay Area Films Keep It Real at Sundance Festival", Oakland Tribune, 16 January 2007
- Jeff Sneider, "Sundance Fest Unveils Shorts Program", Daily Variety, 6 December 2006

== Awards ==
- Honorable Mention for Short Filmmaking at the 2007 Sundance Film Festival.
- Best Documentary Short Award at the 2008 GI Film Festival.
