= Winthrop Jones =

American architect

Walter Winthrop Humphreys Jones (1917–1999), better known as Winthrop Jones, was an architect and painter. Jones was the father of conservation photographer Alison M. Jones and Pamela (aka Pippi) Jones Cunningham, housewife. During a 40-year career in architecture, he designed schools, public buildings, and other facilities in New Jersey.

== Early life and education ==
Jones was born on January 30, 1917, and he grew up in Morristown, New Jersey. After attending the Morristown School (now Morristown-Beard School) in Morristown, New Jersey, Jones graduated from the Indian River School in New Smyrna, Florida. During his time at the Morristown School, he played as a forward for the hockey team. Jones played for the 1933-1934 Morristown School hockey team that went on an overseas tour in Europe to play teams from Switzerland, Germany, and France. The team received a personal message of good luck from President Franklin Roosevelt prior to setting sail for the trip.

After high school, Jones completed a bachelor's degree in architecture at the University of Virginia in Charlottesville, Virginia. He also took coursework at Syracuse University in Syracuse, New York and the Newark College of Engineering (now the New Jersey Institute of Technology) in Newark, New Jersey. Jones did his post-graduate studies in architectural construction and engineering at the New York Structural Institute.

== Architectural career ==
Jones designed buildings for the campuses of Bordentown Military Institute in Bordentown, New Jersey and the Purnell School in Pottersville, New Jersey. He also designed the Hunterdon County, New Jersey Administration Building in Flemington, New Jersey, the Free Public Library of Passaic Township, New Jersey, and an addition to the Church of the Holy Spirit in Lebanon, New Jersey.

The artistic style of Jones influenced Alison M. Jones's engagement in conservation photography. Describing her father's role in her work in The Hunterdon Review, Alison Jones stated, "My father, Winthrop H. Jones, was an architect and painter who constantly framed the world for me. He taught me to see details and graphic forms without my ever really knowing what was happening. It wasn't until I was in my forties that I realized that I had a natural sense of composition and a need to capture the way I saw the world".

Jones also influenced the architectural career of New Jersey architect Susan Rochelle. The book Hunterdon Folks: Everyday People in Small Business, how They Got There, and what They Do to Make America Great states: "Ms. Rochelle started out in interior design, graduating in 1980 from Centenary College with a degree in the subject. W. Winthrop Jones advised her to go for a degree in architecture, so she got her master's. She's licensed in both New Jersey and Pennsylvania, currently working on projects in both states." h

Among Winthrop's employees was William Turnbull, of Moore Lyndon, Turnbull, Whittier, architects of Sea Ranch in northern California. Also Lawrence C. Apgar Jr. An addition at the DuPont estate Winterthur in Delaware was a notable project in the office which Larry assisted Winthrop on.

== Military career ==
During World War II, Jones served in the U.S. Navy. He served as an officer in the combat Information center on board the U.S.S. Chenango, an escort carrier. After receiving a promotion to the rank of commander, Jones returned to working as an architect at the conclusion of the war.

== Notable ancestry of the Jones Family ==
Jones descended directly from colonial leader John Winthrop, who served as governor of the Massachusetts Bay Colony. Jones also descended from Colonel David Humphreys, who served as an aide de camp to George Washington. During Washington's presidential administration, Humphreys served as American Minister to Portugal and Spain.

Elizabeth Jones descended from Captain John Pray, another aide de camp to George Washington. She also descended from Lewis Morris, a colonial governor of New Jersey.
