= 14th Fighter Squadron =

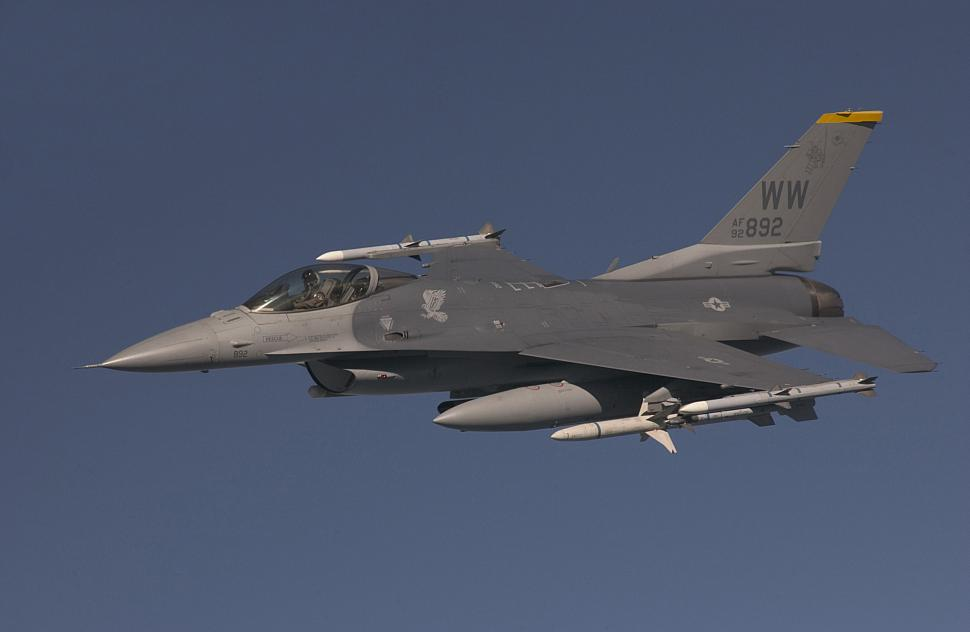
- Squadron F-16C during a training exercise at Eielson AFB (Note: Aircraft is General Dynamics F-16C block 50 serial 92-3892, taken on 24 July 2006.)
- Active: 1942–1945; 1947–1949; 1952–1953; 1966–1975; 1987–present
- Country: United States
- Branch: United States Air Force
- Role: fighter
- Part of: Pacific Air Forces
- Decorations: Distinguished Unit Citation; Presidential Unit Citation; Air Force Outstanding Unit Award with Combat "V" Device; French Croix de Guerre with Palm; Republic of Vietnam Gallantry Cross with Palm

Insignia
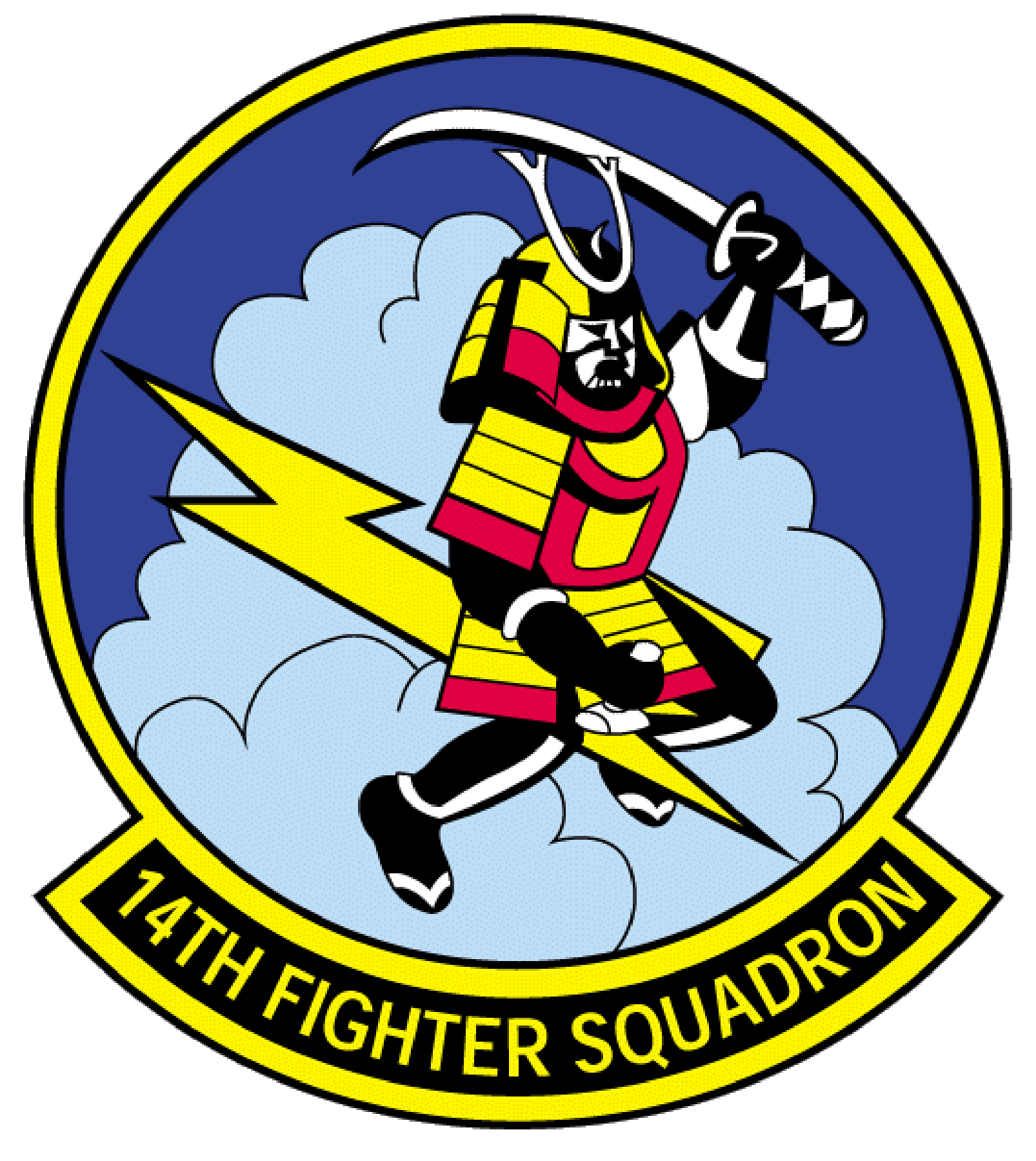
- 14th Fighter Squadron emblem (Note: Approved 7 January 1993.)
- World War II fuselage code (Note: The squadron's aircraft did not display this code until after the end of the war in Europe for security reasons. Post-war it was carried on the wing, rather than the fuselage. Watkins, pp. 106–109): QU

The 14th Fighter Squadron is part of the 35th Fighter Wing at Misawa Air Base, Japan. It operates the F-16 Fighting Falcon aircraft conducting Wild Weasel missions. The squadron has been stationed at Misawa since 1987.

The squadron was first activated during World War II as the 14th Photographic Reconnaissance Squadron. After training in the United States, the squadron moved to the European Theater of Operations. where it flew combat reconnaissance missions. It earned a Distinguished Unit Citation for missions flown over France between 31 May 1944 and the end of June. The squadron flew sorties to support Operation Overlord, the invasion of Normandy and Operation Market Garden, the airborne attack in the Netherlands. It conducted bomb damage assessment of Germany after VE Day. The squadron returned to the United States and was inactivated at the port of embarkation in December 1945.

The squadron served in the reserves as a reconnaissance unit from November 1947 to June 1947 at Binghamton, New York, and as a troop carrier unit at Mitchel Air Force Base, New York, from 1952 until it was replaced in 1953 by a squadron that had been called to active duty for the Korean War.

The squadron returned to the reconnaissance mission in April 1967 and after training in Texas moved to Udorn Royal Thai Air Force Base and flew combat missions in Southeast Asia from November 1967 until August 1973, earning two Presidential Unit Citations. For a period in 1971, it was the only reconnaissance squadron in Southeast Asia. The squadron was inactivated in June 1975 with the United States withdrawal from Southeast Asia.

== Mission ==
The squadron operates General Dynamics F-16CJ Wild Weasel aircraft. It conducts Suppression of Enemy Air Defenses air operations.

== History ==
=== World War II ===
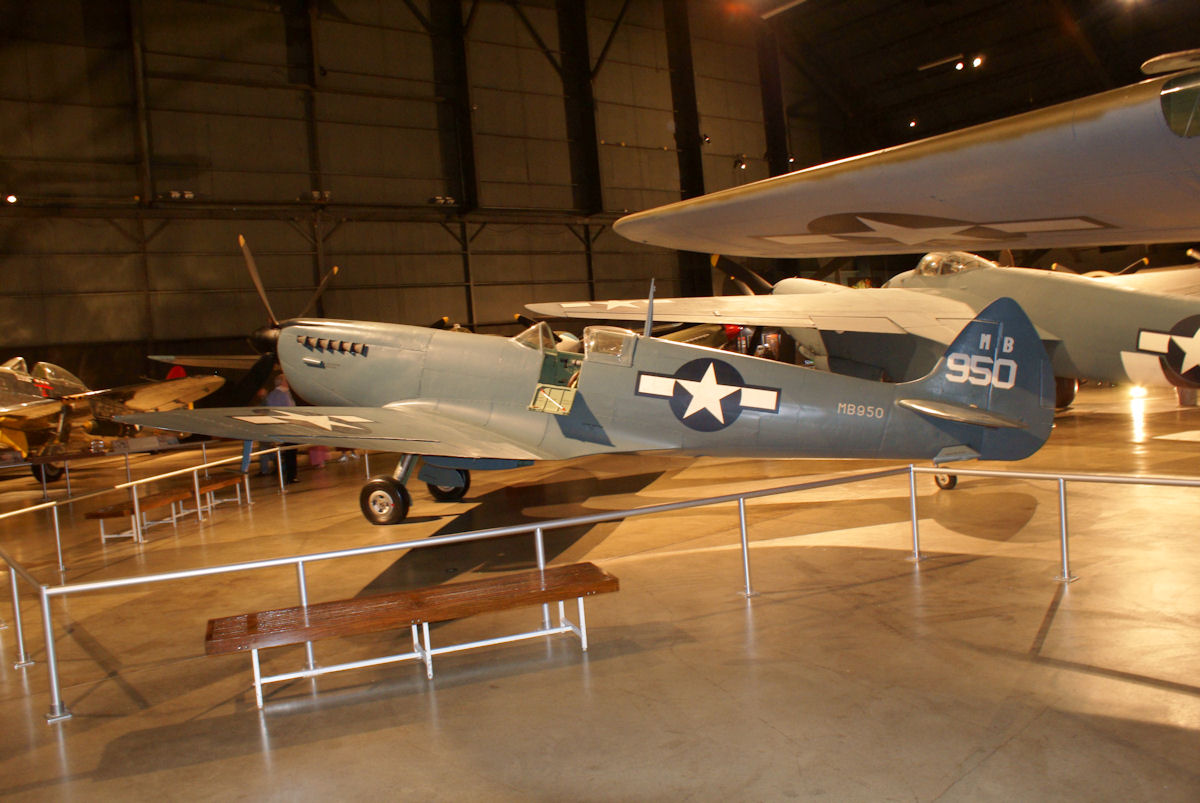
Supermarine Spitfire PR.XI in squadron markings

The squadron was first activated at Colorado Springs, Colorado in June 1942 as the 14th Photographic Reconnaissance Squadron, although it was more than a month before it moved to nearby Peterson Field and began training with Lockheed F-4 Lightnings under the 3d Photographic Group. In August 1942, the 3d Group moved to England. The squadron remained assigned to the 3d, but remained in Colorado, where it was attached to Second Air Force. In July 1943, the squadron was assigned to the 7th Photographic Reconnaissance and Mapping Group and moved on paper with the 7th Group to England. The 7th Group drew on the 13th Photographic Squadron, which was already flying Lightnings in England for its cadre. The 14th Squadron began to train with Supermarine Spitfire Mk. V fighters in July 1943 before equipping with the photographic reconnaissance Mk. XI version of the Spitfire in late summer.

The 14th flew combat reconnaissance missions in the European Theater of Operations from 12 August 1943 until 25 April 1945. The squadron's Spitfires flew the majority of the target photography missions (including the first Spitfire reconnaissance mission over Berlin in March 1944), while the other squadrons of the 7th, equipped with Lightnings, concentrated on photographic mapping. Squadron deep penetration missions included reconnaissance of oil refineries to determine when repairs had been performed that could justify returning them to Eighth Air Force's target list. It earned a Distinguished Unit Citation for reconnaissance missions flown over France between 31 May 1944 and the end of June. The squadron flew over 300 successful sorties to support Operation Overlord, the invasion of Normandy. It flew missions over the Netherlands to support Operation Market Garden in October 1944 and conducted damage assessment of Germany until 23 July 1945. In late 1944, the squadron's unarmed aircraft, flying by themselves, began to prove vulnerable to the jet powered Messerschmitt Me 262s entering service with the Luftwaffe. A squadron aircraft lost on 5 September 1944 was probably the first Army Air Forces loss to a German jet fighter. The unit turned its aircraft in to depots during the late summer and early fall of 1945. Squadron personnel returned to the United States and the unit was inactivated at the port of embarkation in December 1945

=== Air Force Reserves ===
The squadron was activated in November 1947 at Binghamton, New York as a reserve reconnaissance unit and assigned to the 65th Reconnaissance Group, which was located at nearby Rome Army Air Field. The squadron did not possess any tactical aircraft, but was assigned North American T-6 Texans and Beechcraft AT-11 Kansans for proficiency flying. Binghamton's airport had not been completed at this time, so it seems probable that the aircraft operated from Tri-Cities Airport in nearby Endicott. President Truman’s reduced 1949 defense budget required reductions in the number of units in the Air Force, and the 14th was inactivated and not replaced as reserve flying operations at Binghamton ceased.

In June 1952, the squadron was redesignated the 14th Troop Carrier Squadron and again activated as part of the 65th Troop Carrier Wing, which replaced the 914th Reserve Training Wing at Mitchel Air Force Base, New York. The squadron began to train with the Curtiss C-46 Commando with the assistance of the regular Air Force 2233d Air Force Reserve Flying Training Center. On 1 April 1953, the 514th Troop Carrier Wing, which had been mobilized for the Korean War, was returned to the reserves and replaced the 65th Wing. As part of this reorganization, the 14th Troop Carrier Squadron was inactivated in April 1953 and its personnel, equipment and mission was assumed by the 337th Troop Carrier Squadron, which was simultaneously transferred to the reserves at Mitchel.

=== Vietnam War ===
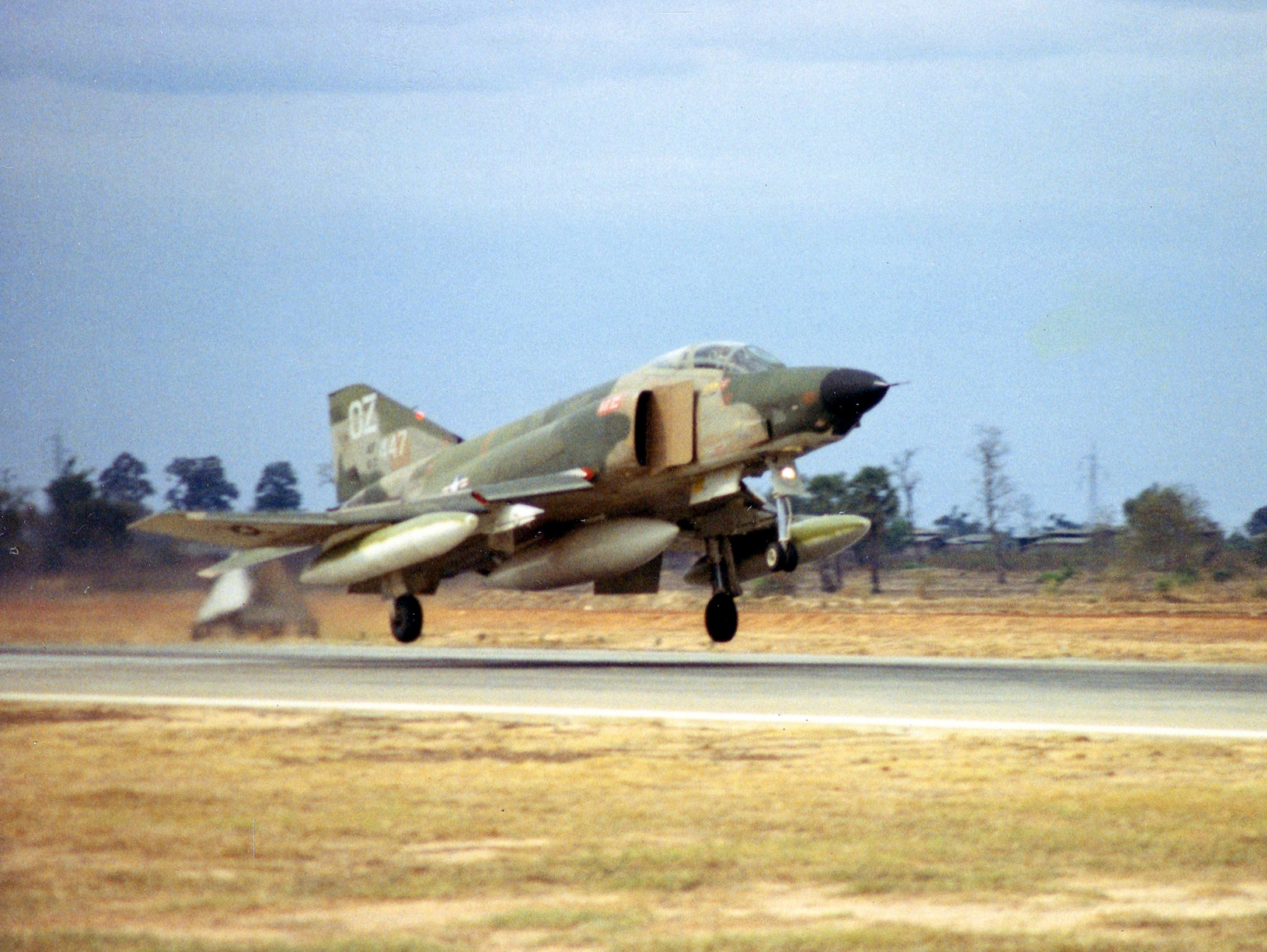
Squadron RF-4C landing at Udorn RTAFB in 1968 (Note: Aircraft is McDonnell RF-4C-31-MC Phantom II serial 66-447. The plane was hit by ground fire and shot down over the Sông Gianh River on 15 August 1968. The pilot, Lt.Col. Terrin Hicks, was killed, the weapons system officer, Capt. Joseph Shanahan, became a prisoner of war.)

The squadron returned to the reconnaissance mission when it was organized at Bergstrom Air Force Base, Texas in April 1967 as the 14th Tactical Reconnaissance Squadron. After equipping with the McDonnell RF-4 Phantom II, the squadron trained in reconnaissance with the 75th Tactical Reconnaissance Wing until October.

The squadron took three days to move to Udorn Royal Thai Air Force Base and flew its first combat missions in Southeast Asia on 2 November 1967. The Phantoms of the squadron replaced the McDonnell RF-101 Voodoos of the 20th Tactical Reconnaissance Squadron, which was inactivated on 1 November 1967. It continued to fly combat until August 1973. For a period in 1971, it was the only reconnaissance squadron in Southeast Asia. It documented by aerial photography the communist takeover of Cambodia and the Republic of Vietnam in 1975.

=== Fighter operations in Japan ===
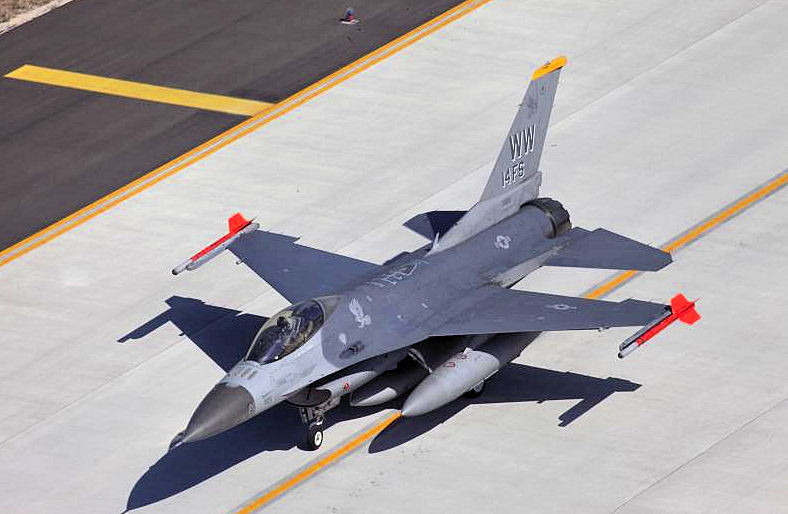
Squadron F-16C at MCAS Iwakuni (Note: Aircraft is General Dynamics F-16C block 50 serial 90-825, taken on 13 March 2011.)

The squadron was again activated in 1987 as the 14th Tactical Fighter Squadron at Misawa Air Base, Japan. It initially trained for close air support using conventional weapons. It also provided for the air defense of northern Japan. The squadron has provided personnel and aircraft to support operations in Iraq and Afghanistan.

== Lineage ==
- Constituted as the 14th Photographic Reconnaissance Squadron on 9 June 1942
- Activated on 20 June 1942
- Redesignated 14th Photographic Squadron (Light) on 5 February 1943
- Redesignated 14th Photographic Reconnaissance Squadron on 13 November 1943
- Inactivated on 27 December 1945
- Redesignated 14th Reconnaissance Squadron, Photographic on 8 October 1947
- Activated on 6 November 1947
- Inactivated on 27 June 1949
- Redesignated 14th Troop Carrier Squadron, Medium on 26 May 1952
- Activated on 14 June 1952
- Inactivated on 1 April 1953
- Redesignated 14th Tactical Reconnaissance Squadron and activated on 25 October 1966
- Organized on 3 April 1967
- Inactivated on 30 June 1975
- Redesignated 14th Tactical Fighter Squadron on 5 June 1984
- Activated on 1 January 1987
- Redesignated 14th Fighter Squadron on 31 May 1991

=== Assignments ===
- 3d Photographic Group (later 3d Reconnaissance and Mapping Group): 20 June 1942 (attached to Second Air Force 31 August 1942, Army Air Forces 6 October 1942, Eighth Air Force after 5 May 1943)
- 7th Photographic Reconnaissance and Mapping Group (later 7th Photographic Group, 7th Reconnaissance Group): 7 July 1943
- United States Air Forces in Europe: 21 November 1945 – 27 December 1945
- 65th Reconnaissance Group: 6 November 1947 – 27 June 1949
- 65th Troop Carrier Group: 14 June 1952 – 1 April 1953
- Tactical Air Command: 25 October 1966 (not organized)
- 75th Tactical Reconnaissance Wing: 3 April 1967
- 432d Tactical Reconnaissance Wing (later 432d Tactical Fighter Wing): 28 October 1967 – 30 June 1975
- 432d Tactical Fighter Wing: 1 January 1987
- 432d Operations Group, 31 May 1991
- 35th Operations Group: 1 October 1994 – present

=== Stations ===
- Colorado Springs, Colorado, 20 June 1942
- Army Air Base, Colorado Springs (later Peterson Field), Colorado, 1 August 1942 – 24 April 1943
- RAF Mount Farm (Station 234), England, 12 May 1943
- RAF Chalgrove (Station 465), England, 2 April 1945
- Villacoublay Airfield (Station 180, A-42), France, c. 13 October – 12 December 1945
- Camp Shanks, New York, 24–27 December 1945
- Binghamton, New York, 6 November 1947 – 27 June 1949
- Mitchel Air Force Base, New York, 14 June 1952 – 1 April 1953
- Bergstrom Air Force Base, Texas, 3 April – 25 October 1967
- Udorn Royal Thai Air Force Base, Thailand, 28 October 1967 – 30 June 1975
- Misawa Air Base, Japan, 1 January 1987 – present

=== Aircraft ===
- Lockheed F-4 Lightning (1942)
- Lockheed F-5 Lightning (1942–1944, 1944–1945)
- Supermarine Spitfire Mk. V (1943)
- Supermarine Spitfire Mk. XI (1943–1945)
- North American P-51 Mustang (1945)
- Noorduyn C-64 Norseman (1945)
- Douglas C-53 Skytrooper (1945)
- North American T-6 Texan (1947–1949)
- Beechcraft AT-11 Kansan (1947–1949)
- Curtiss C-46 Commando (1952–1953)
- McDonnell RF-4 Phantom II (1967–1975)
- General Dynamics F-16 Fighting Falcon (1987 – present)

=== Awards and campaigns ===
Decorations

Award streamer	Award	Dates	Notes
	Distinguished Unit Citation	31 May 1944-30 June 1944	France, 14th Photographic Reconnaissance Squadron
	Presidential Unit Citation	[28 October] 1967-1 November 1968	Southeast Asia, 14th Photographic Reconnaissance Squadron
	Presidential Unit Citation	1 November 1968-31 October 1969	Southeast Asia, 14th Photographic Reconnaissance Squadron
	Presidential Unit Citation	1 April 1972-22 October 1972	Southeast Asia, 14th Photographic Reconnaissance Squadron
	Air Force Outstanding Unit Award with Combat "V" Device	21 November 1969-20 November 1970	14th Photographic Reconnaissance Squadron
	Air Force Outstanding Unit Award with Combat "V" Device	21 November 1970-6 April 1971	14th Photographic Reconnaissance Squadron
	Air Force Outstanding Unit Award with Combat "V" Device	18 December 1972-27 January 1973	14th Photographic Reconnaissance Squadron
	Air Force Outstanding Unit Award with Combat "V" Device	5 January 1975-12 April 1975	14th Photographic Reconnaissance Squadron
	Air Force Outstanding Unit Award	1 January 1991-31 December 1991	14th Fighter Squadron
	Air Force Outstanding Unit Award	1 October 1992-30 September 1994	14th Tactical Fighter Squadron (later 14th Fighter Squadron)
	Air Force Outstanding Unit Award	1 October 1995-30 September 1996	14th Fighter Squadron
	Air Force Outstanding Unit Award	1 October 1997-30 Sep 1999	14th Fighter Squadron
	Air Force Outstanding Unit Award	1 October 1999-30 September 2001	14th Fighter Squadron
	Air Force Outstanding Unit Award	1 October 2001–30 September 2003	14th Fighter Squadron
	Air Force Outstanding Unit Award	1 July 2004–31 May 2006	14th Fighter Squadron
	Air Force Outstanding Unit Award	1 October 2008–30 September 2010	14th Fighter Squadron
	Air Force Outstanding Unit Award	1 March 2011–28 February 2013	14th Fighter Squadron
	French Croix de Guerre with Palm	1944	14th Photographic Reconnaissance Squadron
	Vietnamese Gallantry Cross with Palm	[28 October] 1967-28 January 1973	14th Tactical Reconnaissance Squadron

Campaigns

Campaign Streamer	Campaign	Dates	Notes
	Air Offensive, Europe	12 May 1943 – 5 June 1944	14th Photographic Squadron (later 14th Photographic Reconnaissance Squadron)
	Normandy	6 June 1944 – 24 July 1944	14th Photographic Reconnaissance Squadron
	Northern France	25 July 1944 – 14 September 1944	14th Photographic Reconnaissance Squadron
	Rhineland	15 September 1944 – 21 March 1945	14th Photographic Reconnaissance Squadron
	Ardennes-Alsace	16 December 1944 – 25 January 1945	14th Photographic Reconnaissance Squadron
	Central Europe	22 March 1944 – 21 May 1945	14th Photographic Reconnaissance Squadron
	Air Combat, EAME Theater	12 May 1943 – 11 May 1945	14th Photographic Reconnaissance Squadron
	Vietnam Air Offensive, Phase II	28 October 1967 – 31 March 1968	14th Tactical Reconnaissance Squadron
	Vietnam Air/Ground	22 January 1968 – 7 July 1968	14th Tactical Reconnaissance Squadron
	Vietnam Air Offensive, Phase III	1 April 1968 – 31 October 1968	14th Tactical Reconnaissance Squadron
	Vietnam Air Offensive, Phase IV	1 November 1968 – 22 February 1969	14th Tactical Reconnaissance Squadron
	Tet 1969/Counteroffensive	23 February 1969 – 8 June 1969	14th Tactical Reconnaissance Squadron
	Vietnam Summer-Fall 1969	9 June 1969 – 31 October 1969	14th Tactical Reconnaissance Squadron
	Vietnam Winter-Spring 1970	3 November 1969 – 30 April 1970	14th Tactical Reconnaissance Squadron
	Sanctuary Counteroffensive	1 May 1970 – 30 June 1970	14th Tactical Reconnaissance Squadron
	Southwest Monsoon	1 July 1970 – 30 November 1970	14th Tactical Reconnaissance Squadron
	Commando Hunt V	1 December 1970 – 14 May 1971	14th Tactical Reconnaissance Squadron
	Commando Hunt VI	15 May 1971 – 31 July 1971	14th Tactical Reconnaissance Squadron
	Commando Hunt VII	1 November 1971 – 29 March 1972	14th Tactical Reconnaissance Squadron
	Vietnam Ceasefire Campaign	39 March 1972-28 January 1973	14th Tactical Reconnaissance Squadron
