= Operations center =

Operations center, or operations centre, can refer to the following:

== Military ==
- Air Operations Center, in the United States Air Force
- Base defense operations center
- Civil-military operations center
- Combined Aerospace Operations Centre, of the Royal Canadian Air Force
- Combined Air Operations Centre, at NATO
- Maritime Analysis and Operations Centre, in Lisbon
- Public Affairs Operations Center, in the United States Army
- SNC E-4C Survivable Airborne Operations Center
- Special Operations Troops Centre, of the Portuguese Army

== Places ==
- Aircraft Operations Center, of the National Oceanic and Atmospheric Administration
- Alaska Mission Operations Center, of the United States National Security Agency
- Cyber Security Operations Centre in Australia
- Central Emergency Operation Center, in Taipei
- Combined Space Operations Center, of United States Space Command
- European Space Operations Centre, in Darmstadt, Germany
- Guantanamo Migrant Operations Center, at the Guantanamo Bay detention camp
- German Space Operations Center, near Munich
- Misawa Security Operations Center, of the United States National Security Agency
- National Reconnaissance Operations Center, of the United States National Reconnaissance Office
- National Security Operations Center, of the United States National Security Agency
- Maritime Operations Centre, in St. George's, Bermuda
- Presidential Emergency Operations Center, at the White House
- United States Department of State Operations Center

== Other uses ==
- Command center
- Control room
- Emergency operations center
- Information security operations center
- Mission control center
- Network operations center
- Security operations center
- Space Operations Center (disambiguation)
- Tactical operations center
