= Rumor control center =

Centers that investigate and mitigate rumors

Rumor control centers (RCC) and rumor control mechanisms, identify, investigate and mitigate potentially disruptive rumors, capable of driving a cycle of harmful escalation. Rumor control centers, which often operate call centers, respond to crisis situations such as terrorist attacks, natural disasters, or civil disturbances.

The well-developed crisis control centers established during the Cold War were among the earlier examples of effective rumor control mechanisms. In the United States, during the civil rights movement, rumor control centers were set up and operated with the assistance of the Community Relations Service (CRS), a "peacemaker" agency created by the Civil Rights Act of 1964. Rumor control centers have been established in the United States at different levels of governance, including municipal, regional, state-wide and national. Permanent rumor control centers serve a specific, local population, and have often been set up in response to specific incidents.

Social media makes it easier for rumors to spread, and more difficult for rumor control and fake news to be managed. By 2018, "rumor cascades" were under investigation as stories with serious inaccuracies were spread by millions of people."

== Overview ==
According to a 2004 article by Heidi Burgess and Michelle Maiese, rumors—"knowledge gaps" with "serious inaccuracies" or "misinformation—can drive the cycle of destructive escalation" and contribute to making situations more disruptive. These rumors can be spread "through the mass media—television, radio, newspapers, and the Internet." First, Brugess and Maisse list three phases of a rumor control process. The first step requires a mechanism through which trusted, trained "rumor agents"—usually those experienced and active in conflict resolution—identify the most recent rumors in circulation. The second step requires a strategy for establishing the truth and/or falsehood of the rumors. These "rumor investigators" may also be rumor reporters. Thirdly, there is a need for mechanisms whereby the inaccurate reports can be replaced with reliable information.

The Cambridge, Massachusetts-based Nieman Lab cited a Science report by MIT researchers that by March 2018, "fake news both reached more people than the truth and spread faster than the truth." (Note: Owen noted that "truth" and real news included stories that "had been fact-checked by outlets like Snopes and PolitiFact".) The MIT researchers based their conclusions on "126,000 'rumor cascades' spread by about 3 million people".

Since 2007, Facebook has made attempts to combat rumor cascades by partnering with independent, third-party fact-checkers to identify inaccurate news stories, and to flag them with warning labels to caution users before sharing them. (Note: For example, the Coral Springs Police Facebook page has a warning entitled "Rumor Control" in which they provide a statement contextualizing an October 18, 2018 incident at the Coral Square Mall involving a 14-year-old girl.)

== Natural disasters ==
FEMA created the Hurricane Florence Rumor Control and the Hurricane Michael Rumor Control centers in response to the rumors surrounding Hurricane Florence and Hurricane Michael.

=== Historical context ===
==== Cold War ====
Brugess and Maisse described the Cold War crisis control centers as the "best-developed examples of rumor control mechanisms." They were "confidence-building measures aimed to prevent incomplete information about the actions of opposing military forces from escalating into a violent and dangerous confrontation between the United States and the Soviet Union". In his 1983 publication, Beyond the Hotline: Crisis Control to Prevent Nuclear War, William L. Ury described how a crisis control system was created during the Cold War, "jointly staffed by U.S. and Soviet military and diplomatic officers." A hotline was established, which provided "direct" and "immediate" communication to alleviate some of the "above-normal risk of nuclear war" through "notification procedures for accidental missile launches".

==== U.S. civil rights movement ====
Rumor control centers were established during the civil rights movement in the United States using Community Relations Service (CRS) mediators, who provided reliable telephone numbers, (early call centers), where new rumors could be reported, assessed and the results of the assessment accessed. The trusted rumor agents were either CRS, police departments, city officials, or "people with authority." In a 1999 interview, Manuel Salinas, who served as mediator for CRS from 1968 to 1988, (Note: Manuel Salinas—prior to his 20 years as mediator with CRS (1968 - 1988)—was the state of Colorado's director of Service, Employment and Rehabilitation (SER), a jobs program that was part of the "war on poverty".) said,

[I]f people heard of something, the community could call that number and say, "Hey we heard that fifty cars are coming down the highway," and we would verify that and say "yes" or "no". So rumor control involved getting as accurate information as possible, so that if anybody would call we could convey the correct information. Because rumors begin when you have something like that and they are way off the wall, but the person doesn't know that until you try to find out if it's true or not. The press might call, too. So that's what rumor control was about.

— Manuel Salinas. Community Relations Service (1999)

The first rumor center in the United States was established in July 1967 by the City of Chicago. "An office was equipped with a radio, television and type-writer, and a large map of the city hung on one of the walls. Ten telephone lines were also installed, including direct lines to the Police Department and Mayor's Office. Local government officials encouraged citizens to call the Center if they heard a "rumor"—defined as information unverified by official sources—that suggested social tensions in the city were increasing. The Seattle Rumor Center was established by the "citizen-directed" State Council of Churches, in response to the rise of racial tension in 1968. The Rumor Center was operated "to stop the spread of rumors that might cause tension, panic or bring harm to an individual or group of persons, particularly in situations involving race relations." The Center closed in 1973 "because the need had changed and government agencies had developed methods for dealing with rumor control."

By the end of the 1960s, a hundred cities across the United States had established RCCs. Local government, the private sector, and volunteers funded and operated the RCCs.

==== Niger uranium forgeries ====
On the eve of the Iraq War in the early 2000s, rumors and inaccuracies spread in the U.S. regarding weapons of mass destruction (WMD), including the false information, now known as the Niger uranium forgeries, regarding Iraq's attempted uranium purchase from Niger. According to Burgess and Maiese, the Niger rumor, "was one of the many reasons" "the U.S. administration decided that Iraq had weapons of mass destruction, or at least the ability to make them. This rumor later proved to be false, as did most of the other 'facts' surrounding Iraq's WMD program. While the problems that led to the Iraq war were deeper than simple rumors, rumor control efforts might have played a significant role in slowing down the U.S.'s march to war".

== United States ==
The United States Community Relations Service (part of the Department of Justice) uses rumor control teams when mediating domestic racial conflicts.

=== Background ===
The Community Relations Service (CRS) was created by the Civil Rights Act of 1964 as a "peacemaker" to respond to potential ethnic or racial disputes that might result from the Act. Among other things, the CRS, "worked with law enforcement, city officials, and community members to establish rumor control mechanisms to prevent the spread of false and inflammatory information."

Heidi Burgess and Guy Burgess, directors and founders of the Conflict Information Consortium (CIC) based at the University of Colorado, continue to edit and direct the Beyond Intractability Knowledge Base Project (BI) website as an extension of the CRInfo website.

=== U.S. rumor control centers ===
The U.S. had rumor control agencies at the national, state, regional, county, and municipal levels.

==== National ====
According to their report, the CRS collaborates with individual states, local government agencies, public and private entities, and community organizations to "develop local capacity to prevent racial and ethnic tensions." CRS conciliators initiate "rumor control to prevent misinformation from spreading throughout a community". The DOJ says that the CRS continues to work with officials at the municipal and state level, including law enforcement, and community organizers to help coordinate "safe marches and protests through rumor control mechanisms, self-marshal training, logistical planning, and on-site mediation services".

In his book describing the CRS history from 1964 to 1989, Bertram J. Levine described how a Rumor Control Center was set up in preparation for the May Day 1970 massive protest of the New Haven Black Panther trials on the New Haven Green near both the courthouse and Yale University. Then-FBI Director J. Edgar Hoover wrote that the purpose of counterintelligence action—COINTELPRO (1956–1971)—is to disrupt the Black Panther Party and it is immaterial whether facts exist to substantiate the charge." Jack Middleton—a "seasoned community relations professional" with training in setting up and running an RCC—had helped design and operate a New Haven community-based RCC specifically for the 1970 protest. Levine said that the RCC—operated by Yale Divinity School volunteers in close collaboration with municipal information sources including local police—was a "textbook" example of an RCC run by a private organization. Middleton's manual on RCCs served as a template across the United States for many years. Levine said that the RCCs "played a vital role in limiting chaos during civil disorders."

In 2009, after the passage of the Matthew Shepard and James Byrd Jr. Hate Crimes Prevention Act, which expanded the 1969 United States federal hate-crime law, the CRS's mandate "expanded to include assisting communities in preventing and responding to alleged violent hate crimes committed on the basis of "actual or perceived race, color, national origin, gender, gender identity, sexual orientation, religion, and disability".

The Cybersecurity and Infrastructure Security Agency created a Rumor Control website to combat misinformation about the November 2020 election.

==== State ====
The Iowa Department of Homeland Security has public emergency information distribution plans which include rumor control centers

==== Municipal and regional ====
The city of Baltimore, Maryland, has a permanent Rumor Control Center.

Alachua County, Florida, has a Rumor Control Center which was activated in 1990, after the serial murders of five local college students .

The City of Coral Springs, Florida, maintains a Rumor Central page.

=== COVID-19 ===
Several federal and state rumor control web sites were launched in 2020 to combat misinformation related to the COVID-19 pandemic.

== Rumor control and social media ==
Social media makes it easier for rumors to spread, and more difficult for rumor control to be managed. By 2018, "rumor cascades" (Note: According to Vosoughi et al, "A rumor cascade begins on Twitter when a user makes an assertion about a topic in a tweet, which could include written text, photos, or links to articles online. Others then propagate the rumor by retweeting it. A rumor’s diffusion process can be characterized as having one or more cascades, which we define as instances of a rumor-spreading pattern that exhibit an unbroken retweet chain with a common, singular origin." The researchers noted that not all rumor cascades contain misinformation.) were under investigation as stories with serious inaccuracies were spread by millions of people (Vosoughi et al. 2018:1146)."

=== Rumor control strategies ===
By 2013, research rumor spreading and control was often based on models used in epidemiology, such as SI (susceptible (S), infected (I)), SIR (susceptible (S), infected (I), resistant (R)) models, and more recently, the SEIR model which includes "the flows of people between four states: susceptible (S), exposed (E), infected (I), and resistant (R)".
