= 373rd Intelligence, Surveillance and Reconnaissance Group =

US Air Force unit

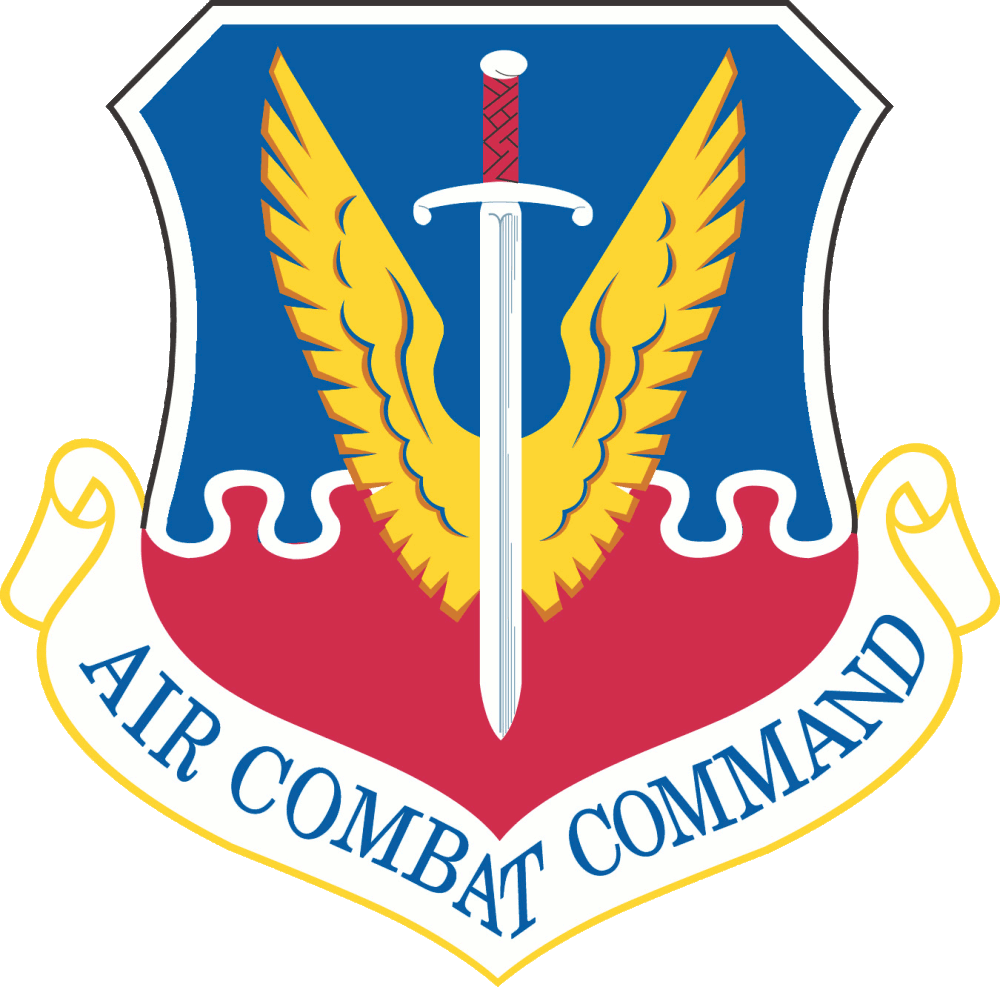
373rd Intelligence, Surveillance and Reconnaissance Group

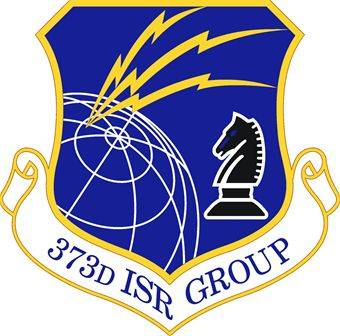
- Group emblem
- Active: 1943–1945; 2000 – present
- Country: United States
- Branch: United States Air Force
- Type: group
- Role: Intelligence and cryptologic operations
- Part of: Air Combat Command
- Headquarters: Joint Base Elmendorf-Richardson, Alaska
- Engagements: European Theater of Operations
- Decorations: Distinguished Unit Citation; Air Force Outstanding Unit Award; French Croix de Guerre with Palm

The United States Air Force's 373d Intelligence, Surveillance and Reconnaissance Group is a Twenty-Fifth Air Force unit located at Joint Base Elmendorf–Richardson, Alaska.

== Mission ==
The 373rd Group is the Department of Defense host service organization and primary force provider for the National Security Agency's Alaska Mission Operations Center, providing warfighters and strategic/national level policy makers with actionable, time-critical intelligence.

== History ==
The group traces its history to the 7th Photographic Group, activated on 1 May 1943. It transferred, without personnel and equipment, to England on 7 July 1943 and assigned to Eighth Air Force. The group used Supermarine Spitfires and Stinson L-5s to obtain information about bombardment targets and damage inflicted by bombardment operations; provide mapping service for air and ground units; observe and report on enemy transportation, installations, and positions; and obtain data on weather conditions.

Prior to June 1944, the group photographed airfields, cities, industrial establishments, and ports in France, the Low Countries, and Germany. Received a Distinguished Unit Citation for operations during the period 31 May – 30 June 1944, when its coverage of bridges, marshalling yards, canals, highways, rivers, and other targets contributed much to the success of the Normandy campaign.

The unit covered missile sites in France during July, and in August carried out photographic mapping missions for ground forces advancing across France. It provided reconnaissance support for the airborne attack on the Netherlands in September and for the Battle of the Bulge, December 1944– January 1945. Used North American P-51 Mustangs to escort its own reconnaissance planes during the last months of the war as the group supported the Allied drive across the Rhine and into Germany. Took part in the final bomb damage assessment following V–E Day

== Lineage ==
- Constituted as 7th Photographic Group on 5 February 1943

Activated on 1 May 1943
Redesignated 7th Photographic Reconnaissance and Mapping Group in May 1943
Redesignated 7th Photographic Group (Reconnaissance) in November 1943
Redesignated 7th Reconnaissance Group in June 1945
Inactivated in England on 21 November 1945
Disbanded on 6 March 1947

- Reconstituted 31 July 1985 and redesignated 373d Electronic Warfare Group

Redesignated 373d Intelligence Group
Activated on 16 September 2000
Redesignated 373d Intelligence, Surveillance and Reconnaissance Group on 1 January 2009

=== Assignments ===
- Second Air Force, 1 May 1943
- VIII Air Force Service Command, 7 July 1943
- 325th Photographic Wing (later 325th Reconnaissance Wing), 9 August 1944
- United States Air Forces in Europe (later United States Air Forces in Europe), 16 July 1945 – 21 November 1945
- 70th Intelligence Wing (later 70th Intelligence, Surveillance and Reconnaissance Wing), 16 September 2000 – present

=== Components ===
- 13th Photographic Squadron (later 13th Photographic Reconnaissance Squadron): 7 July 1943 – 21 November 1945
- 14th Photographic Squadron (later 14th Photographic Reconnaissance Squadron): 7 July 1943 – 21 November 1945
- 22nd Photographic Squadron (later 22nd Photographic Reconnaissance Squadron): 7 July 1943 – 21 November 1945
- 22d Tactical Reconnaissance Squadron: 29 January 1945 – 29 July 1945
- 27th Photographic Reconnaissance Squadron: 9 December 1943 – 21 November 1945
- 28th Photographic Squadron: 1 May 1943 - 21 June 1943
- 29th Photographic Squadron: 1 May 1943 - 21 June 1943
- 30th Photographic Squadron: 1 May 1943 - 21 June 1943
- 301st Intelligence Squadron: 16 September 2000–present
- 373d Support Squadron (later 373d Intelligence Support Squadron): 16 September 2000 – c. 1 June 2015
- 381st Intelligence Squadron: 1 June 2008 – present

=== Stations ===
- Peterson Field, Colorado, 1 May 1943
- RAF Mount Farm, England, 7 July 1943
- RAF Chalgrove, England, March 1945
- Hitcham Air Depot, England, October 1945 - 21 November 1945
- Misawa Air Base, Japan, 7 Sep 2000
- Joint Base Elmendorf Richardson c. 1 July 2015 – present

=== Aircraft ===
- Piper L-4 Grasshopper
- Stinson L-5 Sentinel
- Lockheed P-38 Lightning
- Supermarine Spitfire PR XI
- North American P-51 Mustang

=== Decorations ===
- Distinguished Unit Citation
- France 31 May 1944 - 30 June 1944
- Air Force Outstanding Unit Award
- French Croix de Guerre with Palm
- 1944
- European Theater of World War II
- Campaigns

Air Offensive, Europe
Normandy
Northern France
Rhineland

Ardennes-Alsace
Central Europe
Air Combat, EAME

== See also ==
- List of United States Air Force Groups
