= Chalgrove Airfield =

Airfield in Oxfordshire, England

Chalgrove Airfield (RAF Chalgrove)
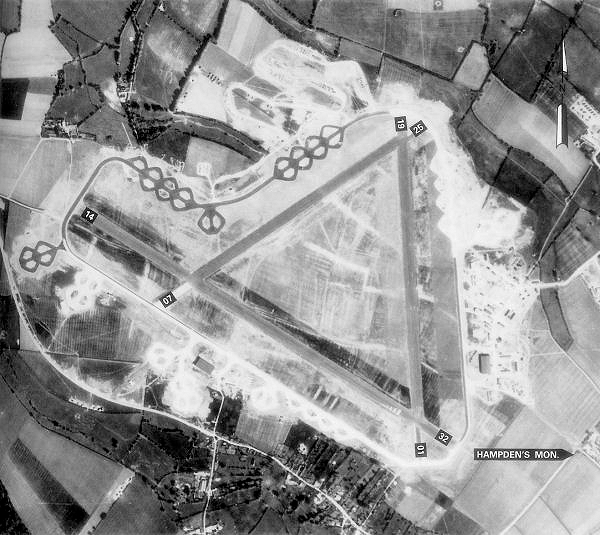
- Chalgrove Airfield – 22 April 1944, about six weeks before D-Day.
- IATA: none; ICAO: EGLJ

Summary
- Airport type: Private
- Owner: Leased from Homes England
- Operator: Martin-Baker Aircraft Company Ltd
- Serves: Oxford
- Location: Chalgrove, Oxfordshire, England
- Elevation AMSL: 240 ft / 73 m
- Coordinates: 51°40′28″N 001°05′07″W

Map
- Location in Oxfordshire

Runways
Direction	Length		Surface
Direction	m	ft	Surface
13/31	1,830	6,004	Asphalt
06/24 unlicensed	1,325	4,347	Asphalt
18/36 unlicensed	1,276	4,186	Asphalt
- Sources: UK AIP at NATS

Chalgrove Airfield (ICAO: EGLJ) is a former Second World War airfield in Oxfordshire, England. It is approximately 3 mi (4.8 km) north-northeast of Benson in the heart of South Oxfordshire between Henley and Oxford; about 42 mi (68 km) north-northwest of London.

Opened in 1943, it was used by both the Royal Air Force and United States Army Air Forces. During the war, it was used primarily as a combat reconnaissance airfield. It was closed in late 1946.

Today, the airfield is primarily used by the Martin-Baker company for testing ejection seats. It has been earmarked for housing.

== History ==
=== United States Army Air Forces use ===
Chalgrove was allocated to the United States Army Air Forces (USAAF) by the Air Ministry on 1 November 1942. It was known as USAAF Station AAF-465 for security reasons by the USAAF during the war, and by which it was referred to instead of the location.

USAAF station units assigned to RAF Chalgrove were:

- 30th Service Group (VIII Air Force Service Command)

493d and 494th Service Squadrons; HHS, 30th Service Group

- 21st Weather Squadron
- 324th Station Complement Squadron
- 40th Mobile Communications Squadron
- 49th Mobile Reclamation and Repair Squadron
- 1078th Quartermaster Company
- 1106th Signal Company
- 1201st Military Police Company
- 1464th Ordnance Medium Maintenance Company
- 2251st Quartermaster Truck Company
- 2060th Engineer Fire Fighting Platoon

==== 10th Reconnaissance Group ====
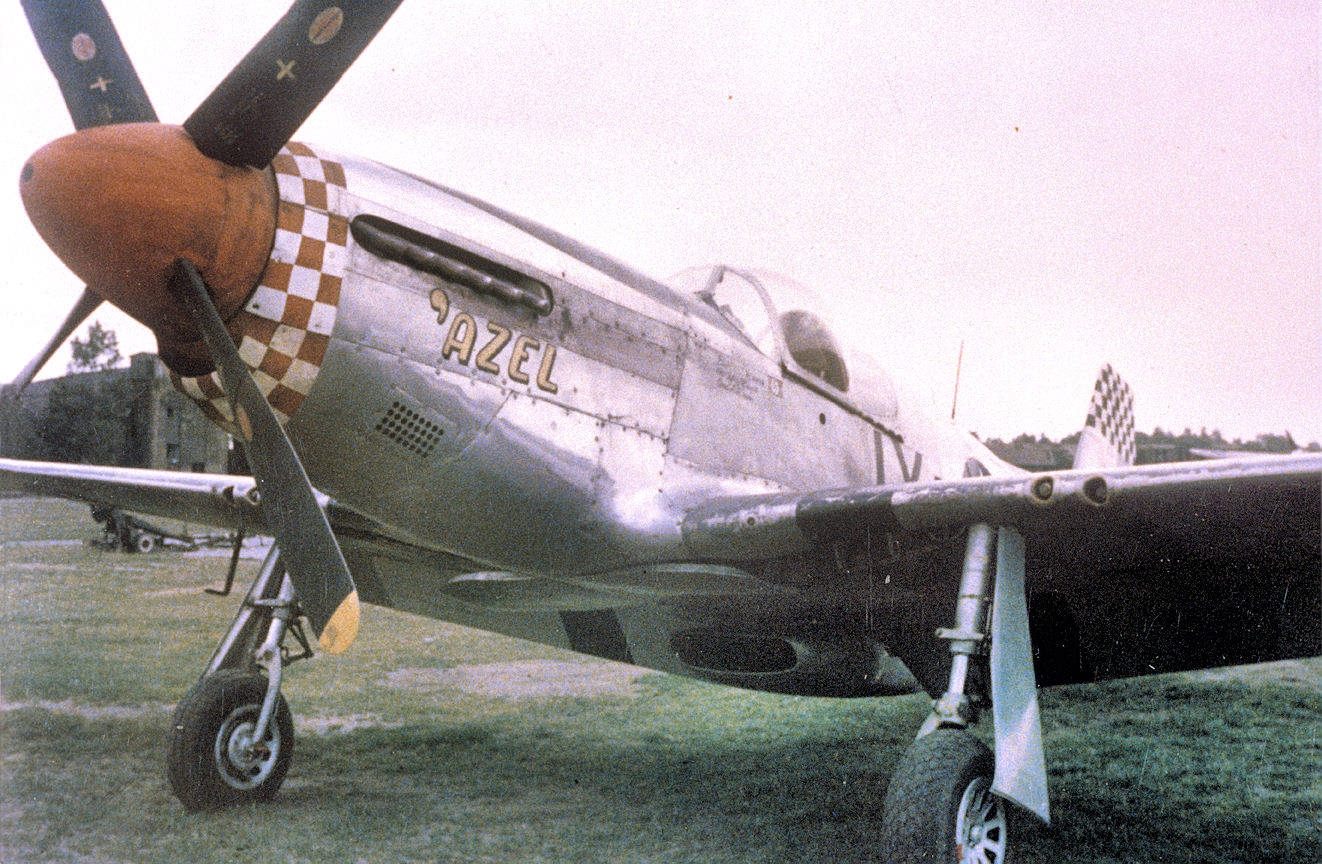
An F-6 Mustang (IX-H, serial number 42-103213) nicknamed "'Azel" of the 10th Photographic Reconnaissance Group at Chalgrove Airfield.

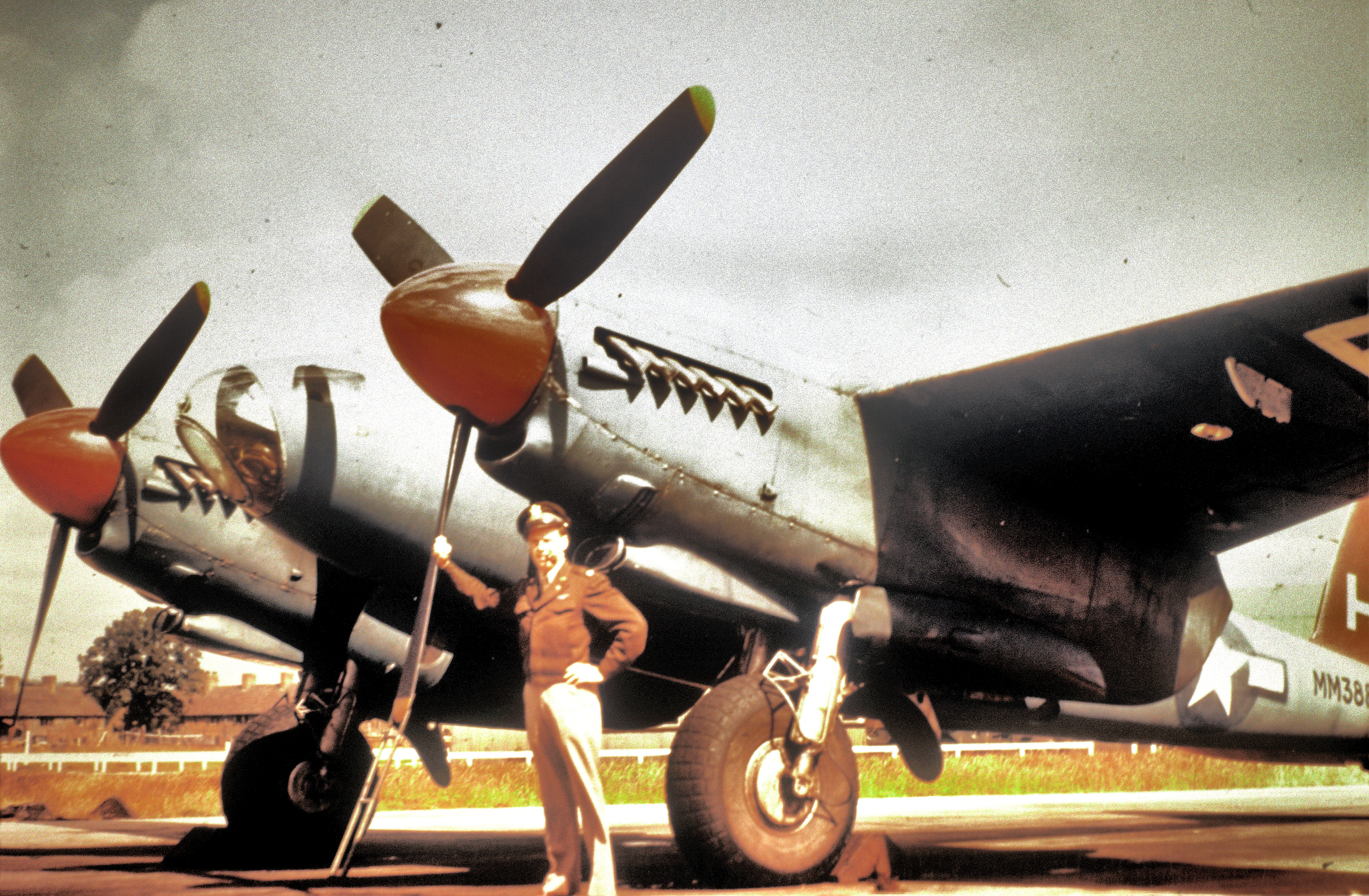
An airman of the 25th Bomb Group with a Mosquito (H, serial number MM 388).

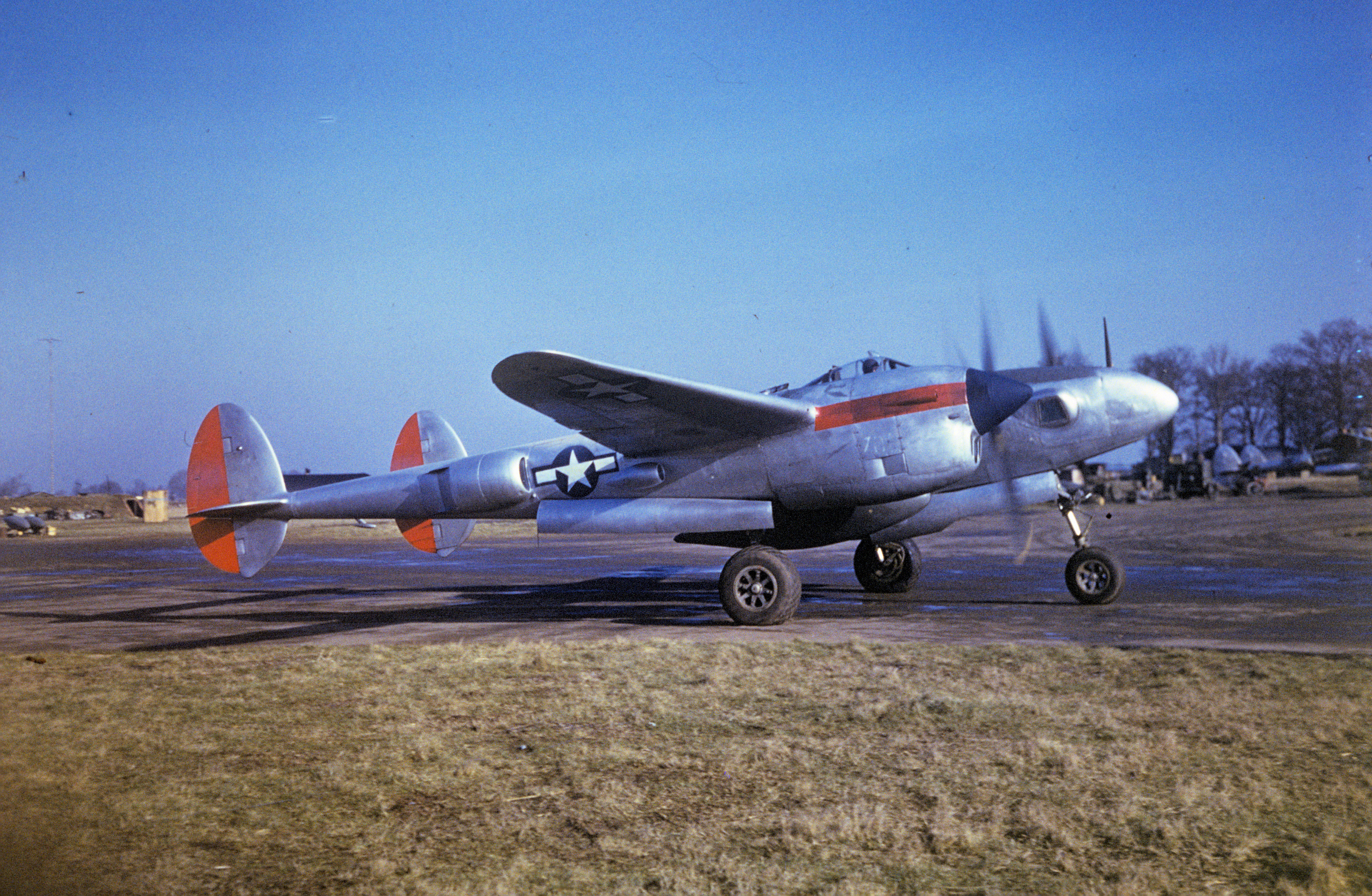
An F-5 Lightning of the 7th Photographic Reconnaissance Group at Chalgrove.

The first residents of the airfield was the 10th Reconnaissance Group which arrived from Key Field, Mississippi in January 1944. The group consisted of the following operational squadrons:

- 15th Tactical Reconnaissance Squadron
- 30th Photographic Reconnaissance
- 31st Photographic Reconnaissance
- 33rd Photographic Reconnaissance
- 34th Photographic Reconnaissance
- 423d/155th Photographic Reconnaissance

The 30th Photographic Reconnaissance Squadron (PRS) arrived in January and early February. The 31st, 33rd and 34th PRS became operational at Chalgrove in April.

The primary aircraft flown by the group consisted of photographic versions of the Lockheed P-38 Lightning (F-5) and North American P-51 Mustang (F-6). In addition, the unit also flew the Stinson L-1 Vigilant and L-5 Sentinel along with the Piper L-4 Grasshopper light observation aircraft.

In May 1944 the 30th PRS moved to RAF Middle Wallop and it was replaced by the 423rd Night Fighter Squadron with Douglas A-20 Havoc (F-3A) from RAF Charmy Down which was used for night photo-reconnaissance. In June the 423d was renamed the 155th Photo Reconnaissance Squadron.

After the invasion, the 15th TPRS moved into France first, to the Advanced Landing Ground at Rennes–Saint-Jacques, France (ALG A-27) on 10 July. The other squadrons of the 10th moved over the next few weeks, the last being the 155th which moved to France in mid-August.

==== 25th Bombardment Group (Reconnaissance) ====
In August 1944 the 653d Bombardment Squadron of the 25th Bombardment Group based at RAF Watton moved to Chalgrove. The 653d was an Eighth Air Force unit equipped with special weather reconnaissance Mosquito PRXVI's which operated over the waters adjacent to the British Isles and occasionally to the Azores to obtain meteorological data. The squadron also flew over mainland Europe for weather information needed in planning operations. In November 1945 the squadron was inactivated.

==== 7th Reconnaissance Group ====
In March 1945 the 13th, 14th and 22nd Photographic Reconnaissance Squadrons from the VII Air Service Command 7th Reconnaissance Group moved to Chalgrove from RAF Mount Farm flying P-51 Mustangs (F-6). Fuselage codes were "ES" for the 13th PRS and "G2" for the 22nd. The unit also flew the Stinson L-5 Sentinel light observation aircraft.

The group was inactivated at the 4th Strategic Air Depot (Hitcham) on 21 November 1945.

=== Royal Air Force use ===
With the inactivation of the 25th Bomb Group, the USAAF returned the airfield to the RAF on 1 December 1945.

== Post RAF use ==
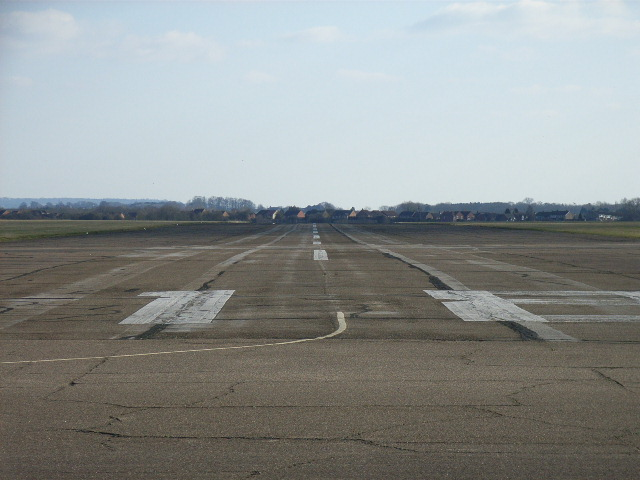
Chalgrove Airfield, looking southwards down the length of one of the runways with Chalgrove village behind.

With the end of military control, Chalgrove Airfield was leased by the Ministry of Defence to Martin-Baker in July 1946 for the development and testing of ejection seats. Although most of the hardstands have been removed over the years, all of the runways and perimeter track exist and are still in use by Martin-Baker. Two of the wartime T2 hangars are in use as part of the airfield and the Monument Industrial Estate site just to the south-east of the airfield contains some old USAAF buildings that were once part of the airfield.

Chalgrove Aerodrome has a CAA ordinary licence (number P683) that allows flights for the public transport of passengers or for flying instruction as authorised by the licensee (Martin-Baker (Engineering) Limited). The aerodrome is not licensed for night use. Runways 06/24 and 18/36 became unlicensed in 2012.

In 2016, under the A Better Defence Estate review, ownership of the site was transferred from the Ministry of Defence to Homes England with the intention of redeveloping the site for 3,000 homes.

It was announced on 6 September 2016 that Chalgrove Airfield had been the subject of a ministerial transfer from the MoD to the Homes and Communities Agency (now called Homes England), with a view to building a housing-led mixed-use development on part of the airfield as part of the South Oxfordshire District Council's Local Plan 2034. This is subject to review and consultation, with the examination-in-public starting in July 2020.

Homes England submitted an outline planning application on 19 June 2020 for 3,000 homes, a secondary and two primary schools, a new town centre and 40,000 square metres of employment space, along with community and leisure uses which will be determined by South Oxfordshire District Council.

The plans have proved controversial, with Freddie van Mierlo, local MP for Henley and Thame, describing the plans as presenting "serious consequences for national security and emergency services" due to their impact on the site's current use by Martin-Baker.

== In popular culture ==
Chalgrove appeared in an episode of the British TV series The Professionals, the Cessna 172 being used by an escaper supposedly crashing into an airfield building. An episode of the cult series The Prisoner also used Chalgrove, including sequences involving a Martin-Baker Gloster Meteor.

== See also ==
- List of former Royal Air Force stations
