= Tri-Cities Airport (New York) =

Airport in Endicott, New York, United States

- IATA: none; ICAO: KCZG; FAA LID: CZG

Summary
- Airport type: Public
- Owner: Village of Endicott
- Serves: Endicott, New York
- Elevation AMSL: 833 ft / 254 m
- Coordinates: 42°04′43″N 076°05′47″W
- Interactive map of Tri-Cities Airport

Runways
| Direction | Length | | Surface |
| Direction | ft | m | Surface |
|---|---|---|---|
| 3/21 | 3,900 | 1,189 | Asphalt |

Statistics (2008)
- Aircraft operations: 48,200
- Based aircraft: 52
- Source: Federal Aviation Administration

Tri-Cities Airport (ICAO: KCZG, FAA LID: CZG) is a village-owned, public-use airport located three nautical miles (6 km) southwest of the central business district of Endicott, a village in Broome County, New York, United States. According to the FAA's National Plan of Integrated Airport Systems for 2009–2013, it is classified as a general aviation airport.

Although many U.S. airports use the same three-letter location identifier for the FAA and IATA, this airport is assigned CZG by the FAA but has no designation from the IATA.

== Facilities and aircraft ==
Tri-Cities Airport covers an area of 230 acres (93 ha) at an elevation of 833 feet (254 m) above mean sea level. It has one runway designated 3/21 with an asphalt surface measuring 3,900 by 75 feet (1,189 × 23 m).

For the twelve-month period ending January 15, 2008, the airport had 48,200 aircraft operations, an average of 132 per day: 89% general aviation, 10% air taxi and <1% military. At that time there were 52 aircraft based at this airport: 86% single-engine, 6% multi-engine and 8% glider.

=== History ===
The Tri-Cities Airport was the principal airport for the Endicott-Johnson City-Binghamton area from the 1930s through the early 1950s. In its early years it had a passenger terminal building, control tower, and cafe. The tower and cafe have since been demolished. The main hangar, also built during the Works Progress Administration era, has also been demolished, in 2010. The small terminal building still exists, although it has been abandoned for some years.

Tri-Cities Airport was planned in 1934 and began at its commissioning in 1936 with three gravel/unpaved runways of about 3,000 feet (910 m). In 1942 the east–west and northeast–southwest runways were paved. Runway 3-21 was 3,500 feet (1,100 m) long and 100 feet (30 m) wide, but later was lengthened in the mid-1980s to 3,900 feet (1,200 m) and the width was reduced to 75 feet (23 m). A parallel asphalt taxiway and a few connector taxiways were added. The east–west crosswind runway 9-27 was 3,200 feet (980 m) long and 100 feet (30 m) wide, but was abandoned around 1969 and now is used as a taxiway along a portion of its length.

An Automated Weather Observing System (AWOS-3) was installed to provide current weather information to pilots. In the flood of 2006 the AWOS was destroyed and soon replaced. In the flood of 2011 the AWOS was again destroyed. In Nov 2015 replacement was again completed, this time elevated well above the 2011 water level so as to protect the equipment from future floods.

=== Airport lighting ===
Runway 3-21 is equipped with medium intensity runway edge lighting. Both runway ends have runway end identifier lights. Runway 21 is equipped with precision approach path indicators, having replaced the older VASIs.

The airport also has an airport beacon, but hills - especially the one to the north - can limit its ability to be viewed.

=== Instrument procedures ===
For many years a circling instrument approach has brought aircraft in from the north via the Binghamton VORTAC, about five miles (8 km) distant. As of Oct 2015 the MDA is 1,367 feet (417 m) above the airport elevation or 1,167 feet (356 m) if the aircraft can identify the CUMOS fix. Visibility required for the approach is 1¼ miles for categories A and B, with categories C and above NA. Some historical procedures in the 1970s required around 1¾ miles visibility as an absolute minimum.

With the addition of GPS-based navigation, straight-in RNAV (GPS) approaches were added for runways 3 and 21. These approaches have slightly lower minima than the VOR-A. Aircraft in categories C and above are still NA. For details, check current approach charts.

=== Weather factors ===
Being adjacent to the Susquehanna River, the airport experiences fog on a relatively frequent basis during the late night to mid-morning hours during the late summer to autumn with visibilities often under one-quarter mile.

== See also ==
- List of airports in New York
