= RAF Mount Farm =

Former Royal Air Force station in Oxfordshire, England

RAF Mount Farm USAAF Station 234
- Located Near Dorchester, Oxfordshire, England
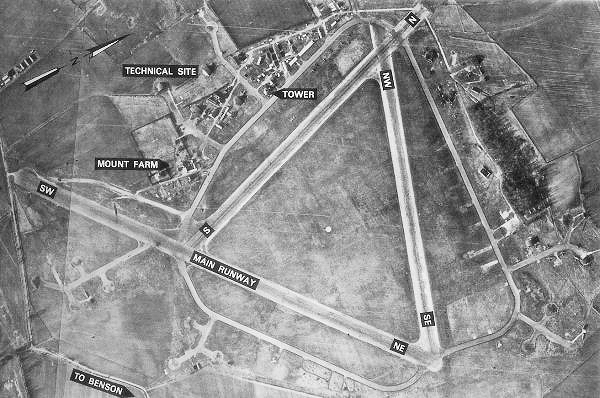
- Mount Farm Airfield - 3 January 1946

Site information
- Type: Royal Air Force station
- Code: MF
- Owner: Air Ministry
- Controlled by: Royal Air Force; United States Army Air Forces

Location
- Location in Oxfordshire
- Coordinates: 51.669°N 1.163°W

Site history
- Built: 1940
- In use: 1940-1957
- Battles/wars: European Theatre of World War II; Air Offensive, Europe July 1942 - May 1945

Garrison information
- Garrison: Eighth Air Force
- Occupants: 7th Photographic Group

Royal Air Force Mount Farm, or more simply RAF Mount Farm, is a former Royal Air Force station located 3 miles (4.8 km) north of Dorchester, Oxfordshire, England.

== History ==
=== USAAF use ===
Mount Farm was originally a satellite airfield for the RAF Photographic Reconnaissance Unit at RAF Benson. The airfield was originally a grass field, but concrete was laid for runway and aircraft parking purposes and for taxiways. All hangars were the blister type. The airfield became associated with the United States Army Air Forces (USAAF) when, in February 1943 it was used by the Eighth Air Force as a photo recon station. Mount Farm was given USAAF designation Station 234 (MF).

==== 7th Photographic Group (Reconnaissance) ====
The first USAAF unit to use the airfield was the 13th Photographic Squadron of Lockheed F-5 (P-38) Lightning photographic aircraft which moved in for training in March 1943 under the experienced RAF establishment. This was the 13th Photographic Squadron. The need for more photographic reconnaissance of targets by the Eighth Air Force led to other American photo/recon squadrons being assigned to the station and on 7 July 1943, the 7th Photographic Group was established at Mount Farm, the group being transferred from Peterson AAF Colorado and absorbing the assets of the 13th photo squadron.

The group consisted of the following:

- 13th Photographic Squadron (red rudder)
- 14th Photographic Squadron (green rudder)
- 22nd Photographic Squadron (white rudder)
- 27th Photographic Squadron (blue rudder)

The group flew a combination of F-5 (P-38), P-51 and Spitfire XI photo/recon aircraft to obtain information about bombardment targets and damage inflicted by bombardment operations. The group also provided mapping service for air and ground units; observed and reported on enemy transportation, installations, and positions; and obtained data on weather conditions.

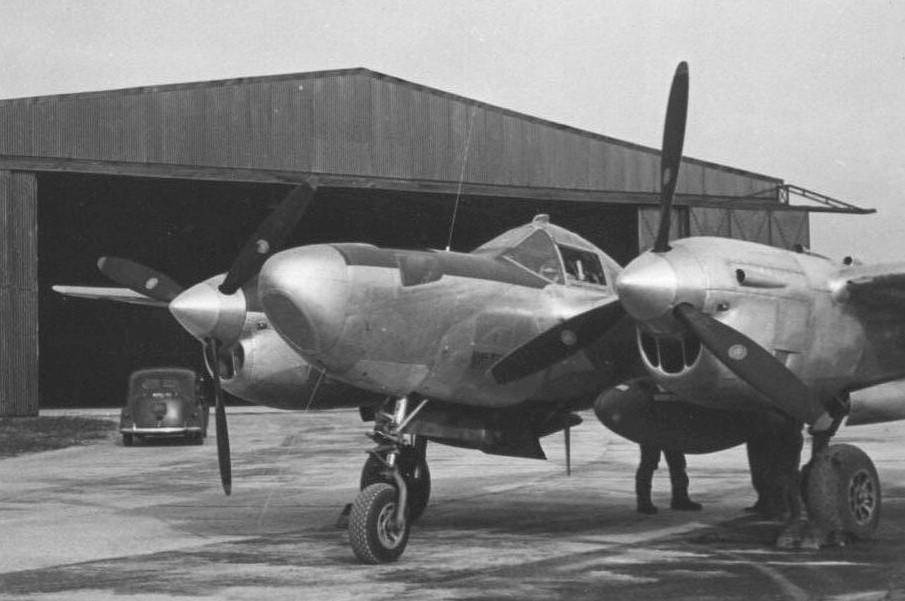
Lockheed F-5 (P-38) of the 7th Recon Group.

Ace RAF reconnaissance pilot Adrian Warburton, attached to the USAAF reconnaissance operations at Mount Farm, and under the command of Elliott Roosevelt, took off from here on April 12, 1944, in an F-5B Lightning for a reconnaissance flight to Schweinfurt, on which he was shot down and killed by flak.

Prior to June 1944, the group photographed airfields, cities, industrial establishments, and ports in France, the Low Countries, and Germany. Following the Berlin raid in March 1944, Major Walter L Weitner flew the first Eighth Spitfire photo sortie to Berlin on 6 March and by 11 April the Group had chalked up its 1,000th sortie.

The 7th received a Distinguished Unit Citation for operations during the period, 31 May - 30 June 1944, when its coverage of bridges, marshalling yards, canals, highways, rivers, and other targets contributed much to the success of the Normandy campaign.

The group covered missile sites in France during July, and in August carried out photographic mapping missions for ground forces advancing across France. Provided reconnaissance support for the airborne attack on the Netherlands in September and for the Battle of the Bulge, December 1944-January 1945.

On September 12, 1944, a USAAF photo-reconnaissance flight over Germany, flown by pilot John Blyth, ended in a wheels-up landing at Mount Farm. Despite Blyth’s repeated efforts, his Spitfire's landing gear had failed to extend. The landing was filmed by a USAAF flight surgeon and amateur photographer, Jim (“Doc”) Savage. The film clip, along with related material, including Blyth's recollections about the use of Spitfires by the USAAF at Mount Farm, was included in a 2006 documentary entitled “Spitfire 944.” The documentary received an honourable mention at the 2007 Sundance Film Festival.

The 7th used P-51's to escort its own reconnaissance planes during the last months of the war as the group supported the Allied drive across the Rhine and into Germany. Took part in the final bomb damage assessment following V-E Day.

The 7th Recon Group took over three million photographs during the course of its 4,251 sorties. It was transferred to RAF Chalgrove in March 1945, and was later inactivated at the 4th Strategic Air Depot (Hitcham) on 21 November 1945.

From here stars including Bob Hope, Dorothy Lamour and Glenn Miller took off to entertain the troops in Europe. Miller performed for the US service personnel at the base in December 1944. From there he went to RAF Twinwood, boarded a Noorduyn Norseman single-engined aircraft, took off for Paris - and was never seen again. His plane is believed to have ditched in the Channel, although there was a belief up until the late 1970s that he may have crash-landed in the dense Chilterns woodlands. Searches found no trace of the aircraft.

=== Post-war governmental use ===
The airfield was transferred back to the RAF on 1 May 1945, and became inactive. After being used for a time by the Ministry of Supply for ex-War Department vehicle sales, it was sold by the Air Ministry in 1957.

== Current use ==
After the end of military control the then Bullingdon Rural District Council redeveloped the site of the RAF and USAAF buildings to build the new village of Berinsfield. The rest of the airfield was almost completely restored to agricultural use, with little evidence of its wartime past.

== See also ==
- List of former Royal Air Force stations
