= Misawa Security Operations Center =

Coordinates: 40.719°N 141.322°E

The Misawa Security Operations Center (MSOC), nicknamed Security Hill, is a U.S. military and National Security Agency (NSA) signals intelligence facility located on Misawa Air Base in Misawa, Aomori, Japan. The center's history began in 1953, when the U.S. Air Force 1st Radio Squadron Mobile established a facility at the site. The center expanded in the 1970s, and by the 1980s it employed around 2000 people. As of March 2009, the center monitored “over 8000 signals on 16 targeted satellites”, according to the NSA. As of 2003, the center employed around 900 people.
