= Alaska Mission Operations Center =

Coordinates: 61.265°N 149.845°W

The Alaska Mission Operations Center (AMOC) is a U.S. National Security Agency facility located on Joint Base Elmendorf–Richardson in Anchorage, Alaska. The facility is considered one of two "consolidated intelligence centers" and is supported by the 373d Intelligence, Surveillance and Reconnaissance Group of the 70th Intelligence, Surveillance and Reconnaissance Wing of the U.S. Air Force. Along with the Misawa Security Operations Center (MSOC) in Japan, the AMOC provides combat intelligence to battlefield commanders, combatant commands, and U.S. Department of Defense leadership. The NSA operation at Elmendorf AFB was a suspected ECHELON ground station.
