= 301st Intelligence Squadron =

301st Intelligence Squadron

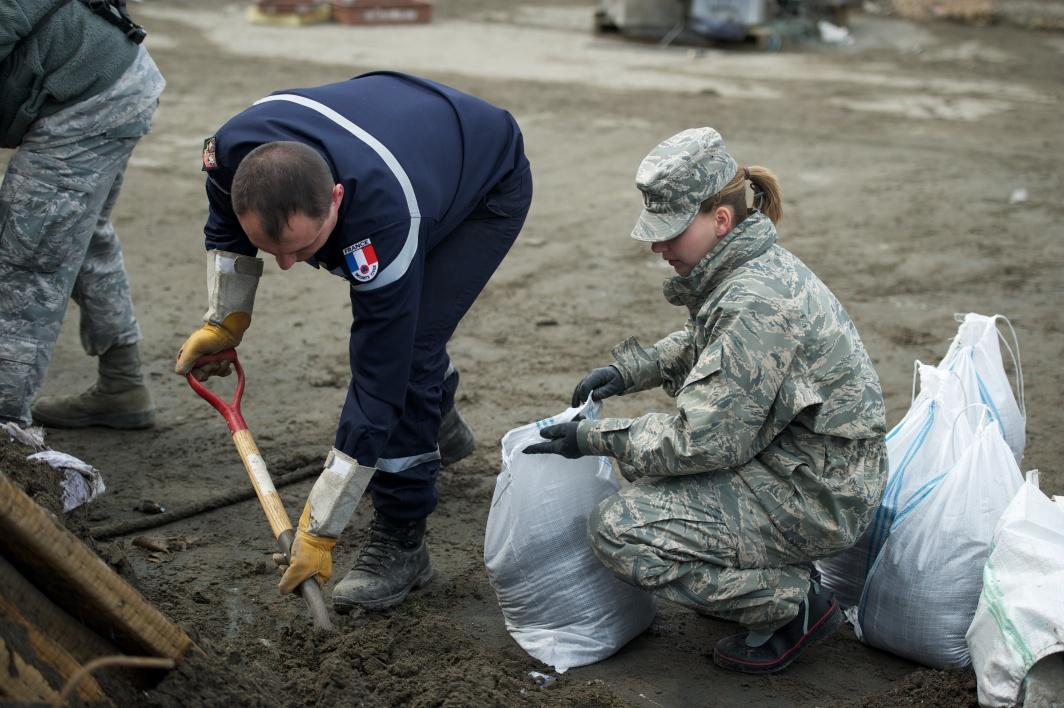
- 301st Intelligence Squadron officer assists with tsunami cleanup
- Active: 1942–1955; 1978–present
- Country: United States
- Branch: United States Air Force
- Role: Military intelligence
- Garrison/HQ: Joint Base Elmendorf-Richardson, Alaska
- Engagements: Southwest Pacific Theater
- Decorations: Air Force Outstanding Unit Award with Combat "V"; Air Force Meritorious Unit Award; Air Force Outstanding Unit Award; Philippine Presidential Unit Citation

Insignia
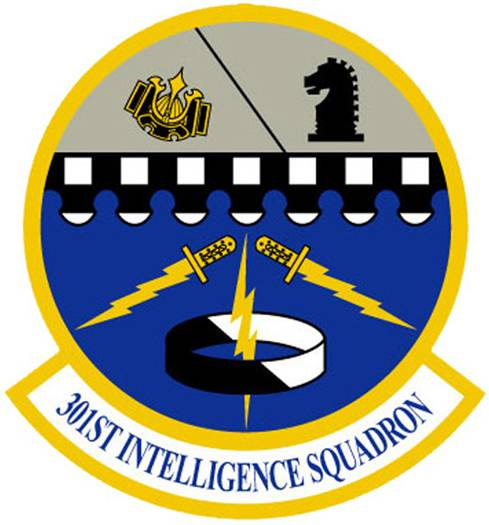
- 301st Intelligence Squadron emblem (Approved 5 February 1982)

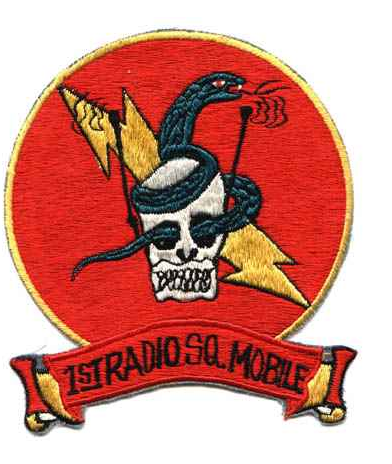
- 1st Radio Squadron, Mobile emblem

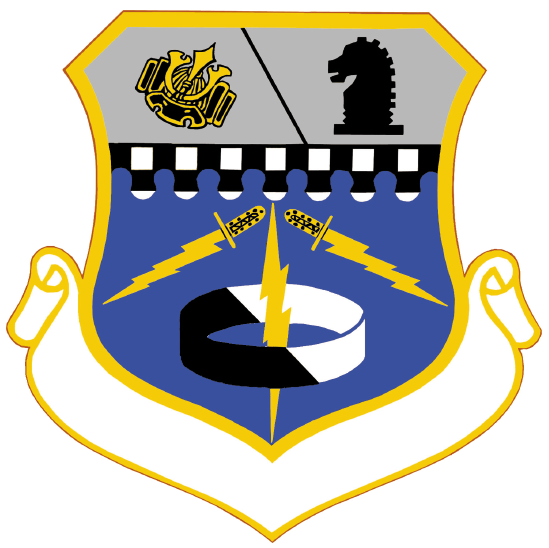
- 6920th Electronic Security Group emblem

The United States Air Force's 301st Intelligence Squadron is an intelligence unit located at Joint Base Elmendorf-Richardson, Alaska.

The squadron's first predecessor was organized in 1942 as the 138th Signal Radio Intelligence Company, a signals intelligence unit. The company served in the Southwest Pacific Theater during World War II, then moved to Japan to join the occupation forces. Redesignated 1st Radio Squadron, Mobile in 1946, the unit transferred from the United States Army to the United States Air Force in 1949 and served in Japan until inactivation in May 1955.

The squadron's other predecessor was organized at Misawa Air Base, Japan in 1978 as the 6920th Security Squadron. In October 1993, the two units were consolidated as the 301st. It continued to serve at Misawa until June 2014, when it moved to its present location.

== Mission ==
The squadron is a partner to the 381st Intelligence Squadron at the Alaska Mission Operations Center. The unit's mission is to collect, process, analyze, and report signals intelligence on adversary operations, capabilities, and intentions. Additionally, unit personnel provide tactical analytic support to combat units and conduct communications, maintenance, and administrative actions supporting site operations.

== History ==
=== World War II ===
The first predecessor of the squadron was activated in February 1942 as the 138th Signal Intelligence Company at Fort George Wright, Washington. It received it initial cadre on 25 February drawing from the 404th Signal Company, Aviation; 434th Signal Maintenance Company, Aviation and 39th Signal Platoon, Air Base. However, it was April before a substantial number of people were assigned to the company. The company continued training at Fort Wright until May 1943, when they departed for shipment to the Southwest Pacific, Staging through Fort Dix, New Jersey. On 13 May, the company boarded the USAT Uruguay for a monthlong shipment through the Panama Canal to Brisbane, Australia.

In August 1942, the squadron moved forward to Port Moresby, New Guinea to begin operations. The squadron continued radio intercept operations of Japanese radio transmissions until VJ Day.

Following the war, the unit was transferred from the Army Signal Corps to the Air Corps and redesignated the 1st Radio Squadron. However, it remained part of Army Security Agency for more than a year after the United States Air Force became independent, not transferring to United States Air Force Security Service until 1 February 1949.

=== Korean War ===
The squadron remained in Japan after the war with the mission of monitoring Soviet air and air defense signals. When the North Koreans crossed the 38th parallel and invaded in June 1950, the squadron's commander ordered its vehicles to be laagered on the Johnson Air Base football field in case of a parachute attack on Japan. A detachment of the squadron moved to Korea on 15 July 1950. However Fifth Air Force had established its own ad hoc signals intelligence party near Seoul, which commandeered the 1st Squadron's equipment. However, additional mobile radio intercept detachments began arriving before the end of the year.

In March 1951, squadron operators in Japan began picking up voice communications in Russian between ground controllers and Mikoyan-Gurevich MiG-15 fighters. By April, the squadron had established a mobile van in central Korea, which passed information on MiGs to the Fifth Air Force tactical air control center, which passed it on to American North American F-86 Sabres, disguising the information to make it appear that it was coming from radar ground stations, even though the radio intercept van could provide warning of Soviet aircraft movements well beyond the range of American radars. Separate stations were established for intercepting enemy morse code signals dealing with both enemy and friendly traffic. After September 1951, these operations were consolidated in Seoul. The information provided by squadron operators has been credited as the major factor in the increased kill ratio of Sabre pilots over the MiG-15 in Korea starting in mid-1951, especially in view of analysis that indicated that by the fall of 1952 90% of MiG pilots in Korea were Russians. In January 1951, the squadron moved to Misawa Air Base, Japan, where one of the first Elephant Cage high frequency direction finding antenna assemblies was located. The squadron was inactivated in May 1955, and its mission, personnel and equipment transferred to the 6921st Radio Squadron, Mobile.

=== 6920th Electronic Security Group ===
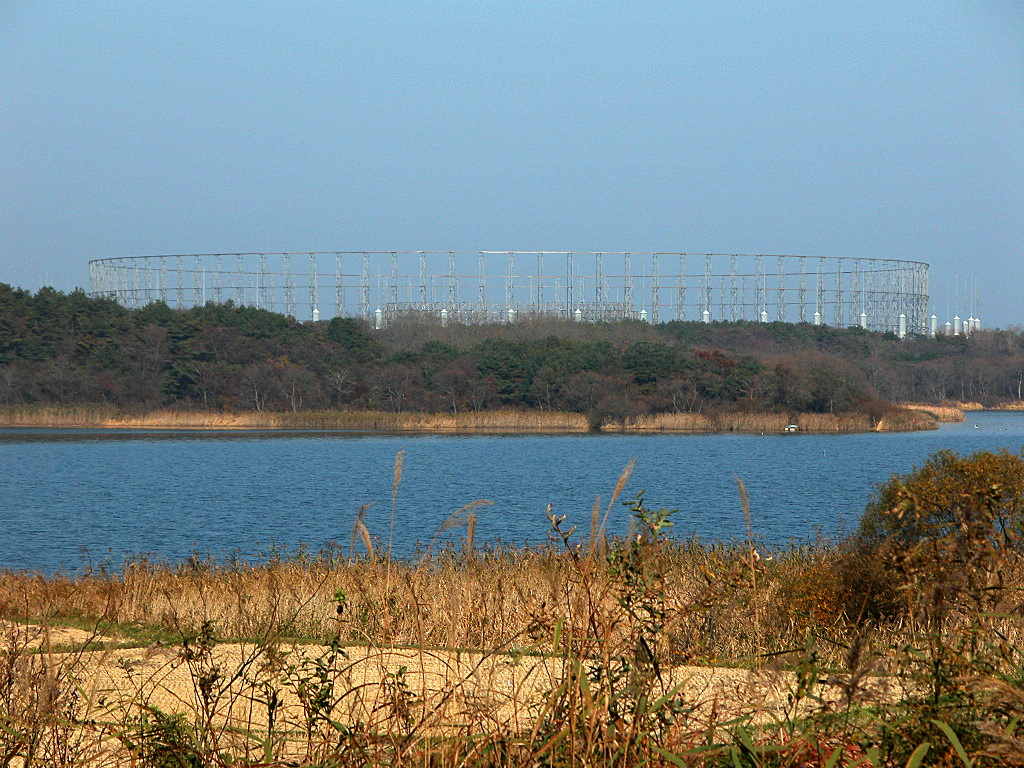
AN/FLR-9 "elephant cage" antenna used by the squadron at Misawa

The second squadron antecedent was activated as the 6920th Security Squadron at Misawa Air Base, Japan in October 1978. When USAF Security Service became Electronic Security Command, the squadron was expanded to group size as the 6920th Electronic Security Group.

In October 1992, the unit became one of the operational components, with the Naval Security Group Activity, Misawa, a Marine company, and the 750th Military Intelligence Company, in the Misawa Cryptologic Operations Center.

=== 301st Intelligence Squadron ===
In October 1993, the 1st Radio Squadron (which had been disbanded in 1985), was reconstituted and consolidated with the 6920th Group and the consolidated squadron was named the 301st Intelligence Squadron. The squadron mission at Misawa was to process time-critical combat information for unified and specified commands and the National Command Authorities. It conducted satellite communications processing and reporting. The 301st provided sensitive communications support to aircraft. It operated and maintained $500,000,000 of electronic equipment.

After the massive tsunami and devastating earthquake measuring 9.0 on the Richter Scale struck the coast of Japan in 2011, Airmen of the 301st devoted countless hours alongside other Americans and Japanese during Operation Tomodachi by assisting with clean-up and restoration efforts throughout Japan.

In June 2014, as the Misawa operations center closed and intelligence personnel there were reduced by more than 500 people, the squadron moved from Misawa to Joint Base Elmendorf-Richardson when the intelligence center at Misawa closed.

== Lineage ==
1st Radio Squadron, Mobile

- Constituted as the 138th Signal Radio Intelligence Company on 7 February 1942
- Activated on 14 February 1942
- Redesignated 138th Signal Radio Intelligence Company, Aviation on 29 October 1943
- Redesignated 1st Radio Squadron, Mobile (J) (Note: Although only the letter J was included in the unit designation, this indicated the squadron was trained in Japanese language intercepts.) on 29 February 1944
- Redesignated 1st Radio Squadron, Mobile on 14 November 1946

Inactivated on 8 May 1955

- Disbanded on 15 June 1983.
- Reconstituted on 1 October 1993 and consolidated with the 6920th Electronic Security Group as the 301st Intelligence Squadron

6920th Electronic Security Group

- Designated as the 6920th Security Squadron on 1 October 1978 and activated
- Redesignated 6920th Electronic Security Group on 1 August 1979
- Consolidated with the 1st Radio Squadron, Mobile as the 301st Intelligence Squadron

301st Intelligence Squadron

- Consolidated unit designated 301st Intelligence Squadron 1 October 1993 – present

=== Assignments ===
- Second Air Force, 14 February 1942
- Fifth Air Force, 12 June 1943
- Army Security Agency, Pacific, 4 January 1946 (attached to Fifth Air Force after 9 February 1946)
- United States Air Force Security Service, 1 February 1949 (remained attached to Fifth Air Force, 35th Fighter Wing (later 35th Fighter-Interceptor Wing), 1 July 1949, 3d Bombardment Wing, 1 April 1950; 35th Fighter-Interceptor Wing, 14 August 1950; 6162d Air Base Wing, 1 December 1950; 35th Fighter-Interceptor Wing after 25 May 1951)
- 6920 Security Group (later 6920 Security Wing), 16 February 1952 – 8 May 1955 (remained attached to 35th Fighter-Interceptor Wing, 6016th Air Base Wing, 28 January 1953; 49th Fighter-Bomber Wing, 18 November 1953 – 8 May 1955)
- United States Air Force Security Service (later Electronic Security Command), 1 Oct 1978-c. Aug 1979 (attached to 6112th Air Base Wing)
- Electronic Security, Pacific (later Pacific Electronic Security Division, 692d Intelligence Wing, 692d Intelligence Group), 30 September 1980
- 373d Intelligence, Surveillance and Reconnaissance Group, 7 September 2000 – present

=== Stations ===
- Fort George Wright, Washington, 14 February 1942 – 5 May 1943
- Brisbane, Australia, 15 June 1943
- Port Moresby, New Guinea, by c. 5 August 1943
- Nadzab, New Guinea, by 21 February 1944
- Biak, New Guinea, September 1944
- Clark Field, Philippines, 31 May 1945
- Yokota Air Base, Japan, 20 December 1945
- Irumagawa Air Base (later Johnson Air Base), Japan, by 1 February 1946
- Misawa Air Base, Japan, 26 January 1953 – 8 May 1955
- Misawa Air Base, Japan, 1 October 1978
- Joint Base Elmendorf-Richardson, Alaska, 1 July 2014 – present

=== Awards and campaigns ===
Award streamer	Award	Dates	Notes
	Air Force Outstanding Unit Award with Combat "V" Device	1 June 2001–31 May 2003	301st Intelligence Squadron
	Meritorious Unit Citation	1 June 1944-1 July 1944	138th Signal Intelligence Company
	Air Force Outstanding Unit Award	26 November 1950-18 July 1951	1st Radio Squadron
	Air Force Outstanding Unit Award	1 July 1982-30 June 1984	6920th Electronic Security Group
	Air Force Outstanding Unit Award	1 July 1986-30 June 1988	6920th Electronic Security Group
	Air Force Outstanding Unit Award	1 July 1991-30 June 1993	6920th Electronic Security Group
	Air Force Outstanding Unit Award	1 October 1993-30 September 1994	301st Intelligence Squadron
	Air Force Outstanding Unit Award	1 October 1994-30 September 1995	301st Intelligence Squadron
	Air Force Outstanding Unit Award	1 October 1999-30 September 2000	301st Intelligence Squadron
	Air Force Outstanding Unit Award	1 June 2004–31 May 2005	301st Intelligence Squadron
	Air Force Outstanding Unit Award	1 June 2006–31 December 2007	301st Intelligence Squadron
	Air Force Outstanding Unit Award	1 June 2008–31 May 2009	301st Intelligence Squadron
	Philippine Republic Presidential Unit Citation	31 May 1945-4 July 1945	138th Signal Intelligence Company

Campaign Streamer	Campaign	Dates	Notes
	American Theater without inscription	14 February 1942 – 5 May 1943	138th Signal Intelligence Company
	New Guinea	5 August 1943 – 31 December 1944	138th Signal Intelligence Company (later 1st Radio Squadron)
	Leyte	17 October 1944 – 1 July 1945	1st Radio Squadron
	Luzon	15 December 1944 – 4 July 1945	1st Radio Squadron
	World War II Army of Occupation (Japan)	20 December 1945 to 27 April 1952	1st Radio Squadron
	Korean service without inscription	27 June 1950 – 27 July 1953	1st Radio Squadron

== See also ==
- MiG Alley
- List of United States Air Force squadrons
