= 13th Reconnaissance Squadron =

13th Reconnaissance Squadron

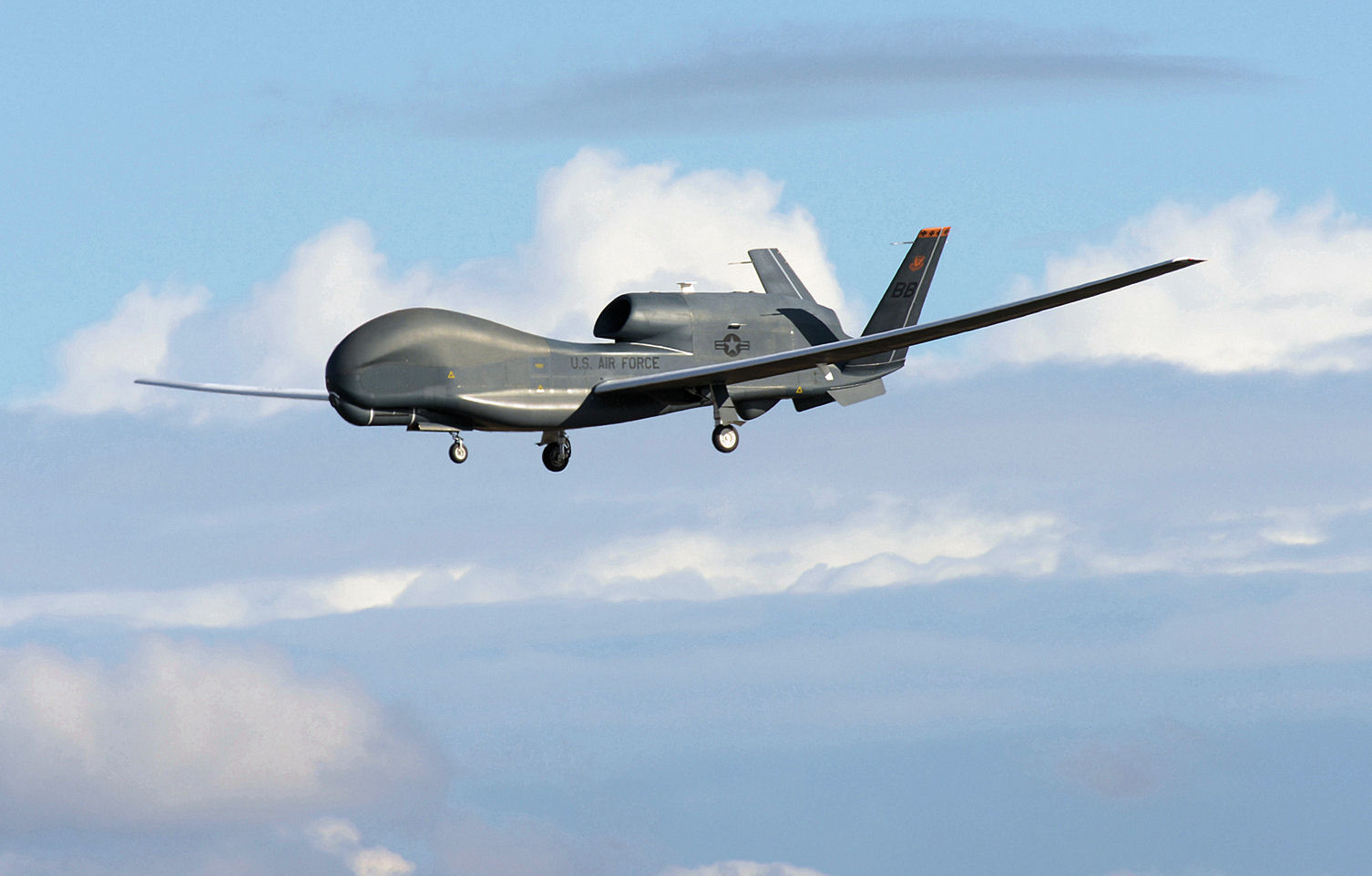
- 13th Reconnaissance Squadron RQ-4 Global Hawk
- Active: 1942–1945; 1947–1949; 1952–1953; 1987–2000; 2005–present
- Country: United States
- Branch: United States Air Force
- Role: Reconnaissance and Surveillance
- Part of: Air Force Reserve Command
- Garrison/HQ: Beale Air Force Base
- Nickname: Lucky Thirteen
- Engagements: European Theater of Operations
- Decorations: Distinguished Unit Citation; Air Force Outstanding Unit Award; French Croix de Guerre with Palm

Insignia
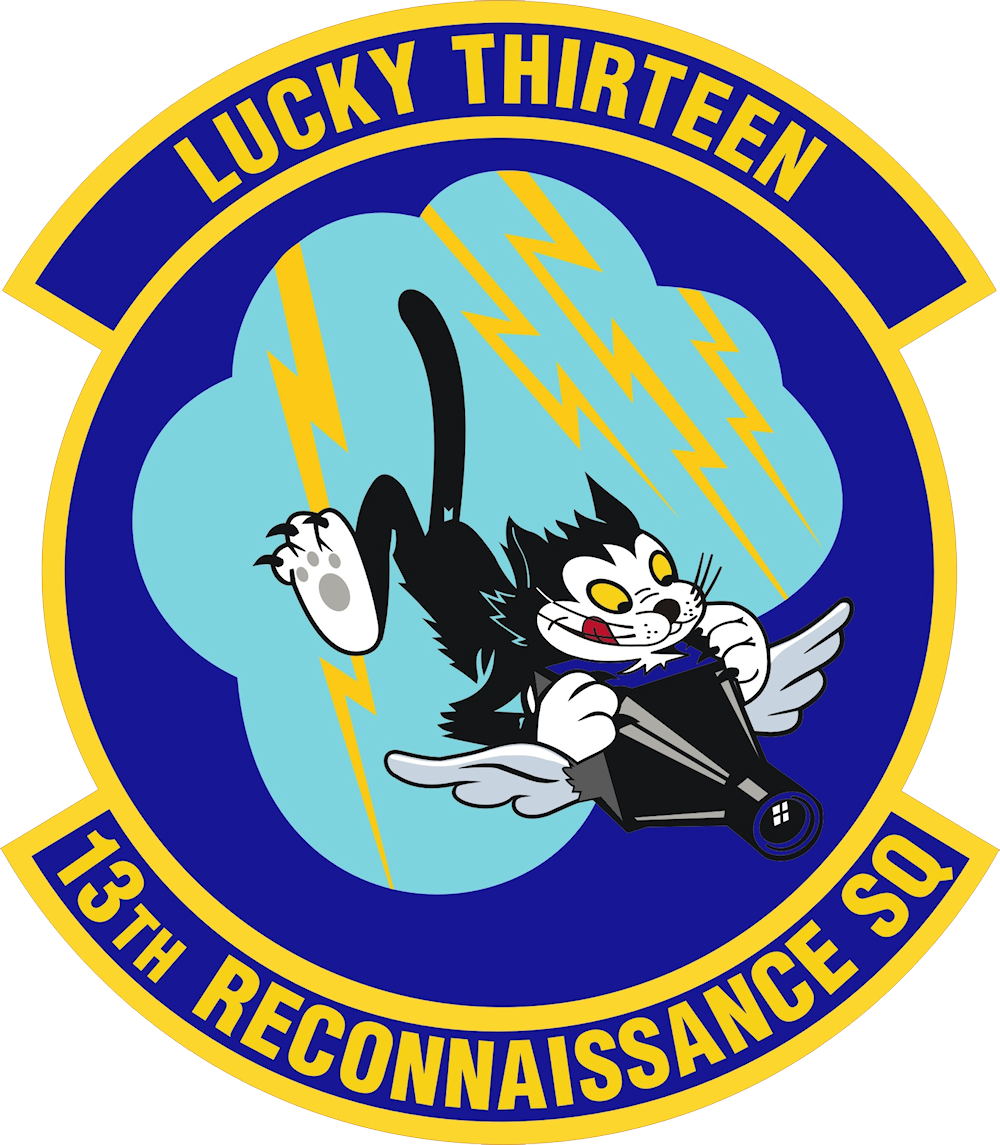
- 13th Reconnaissance Squadron emblem (Note: Rendition approved 21 December 2011.)

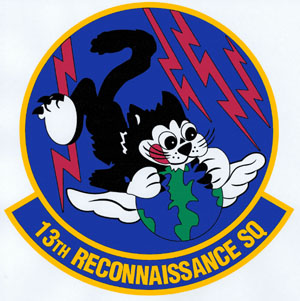
- 13th Airlift Squadron emblem (Note: Approved 5 June 1995.)

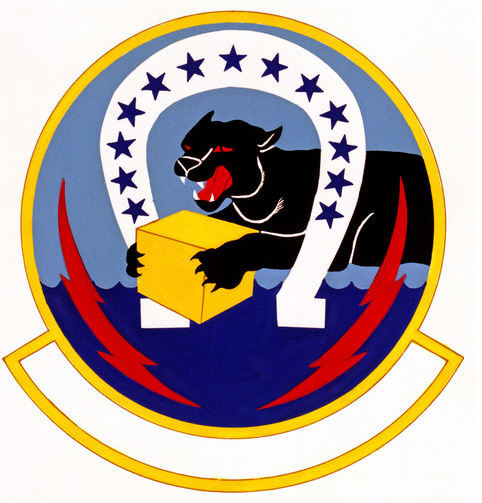
- 13th Military Airlift Squadron emblem (Note: Approved 13 October 1988.)

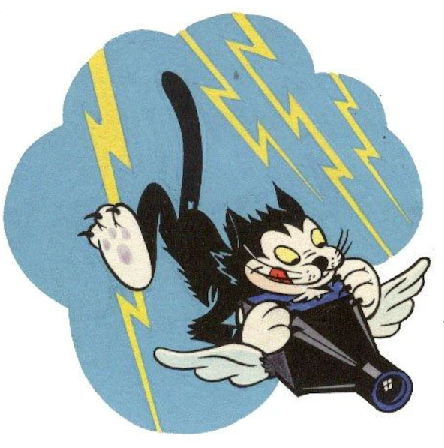
- 13th Photographic Reconnaissance Squadron emblem (Note: Approved 6 March 1944.)

The 13th Reconnaissance Squadron is part of the 926th Wing at Beale Air Force Base, California. It operates RQ-4 Global Hawk unmanned aircraft conducting reconnaissance and surveillance missions.

== Mission ==
The squadron provides theater commanders with near-real-time intelligence, surveillance, reconnaissance and target acquisition data.

== History ==
=== World War II ===
The 13th flew combat in the European Theater of Operations from 28 March 1943 – 26 April 1945.

=== Airlift ===
In 1952, it converted to a troop carrier mission and provided intra-theater airlift for high-ranking USAFE military and civilian officials and small mission-essential equipment from, 1987–1993. In 1987, it was renamed the 13th Military Airlift Squadron.

The squadron moved without personnel and equipment to McGuire Air Force Base, New Jersey, on 1 October 1993 and absorbed personnel and equipment of the 30th Airlift Squadron and was renamed the 13th Airlift Squadron. Equipped with C-141, the squadron took on a new worldwide airlift mission until its inactivation in 2000.

=== Unmanned reconnaissance ===
Since 2005 the 13th has operated and maintained deployable, long-endurance RQ-4 Global Hawk aircraft and ground control elements to fulfill training and operational requirements generated by the Joint Chiefs of Staff in support of unified commanders and the Secretary of Defense. It currently trains all RQ-4B pilots and sensor operators.

== Lineage ==
- Constituted as the 13th Photographic Reconnaissance Squadron on 9 June 1943

Activated on 20 June 1942
Redesignated 13th Photographic Squadron (Light) on 6 February 1943
Redesignated 13th Photographic Reconnaissance Squadron on 13 November 1943
Inactivated on 1 December 1945

- Redesignated 13th Reconnaissance Squadron, Photographic on 11 March 1947

Activated in the reserve on 6 July 1947
Inactivated on 27 June 1949

- Redesignated 13th Troop Carrier Squadron, Medium on 26 May 1952

Activated in the reserve on 14 June 1952
Inactivated on 1 April 1953

- Redesignated 13th Military Airlift Squadron on 14 July 1987

Activated on 1 October 1987
Redesignated 13 Airlift Squadron on 1 April 1992
Inactivated on 31 March 2000

- Redesignated 13th Reconnaissance Squadron on 10 February 2005

Activated in the reserve on 12 March 2005

=== Assignments ===
- 3d Photographic Group (later 3d Photographic Reconnaissance and Mapping Group), 20 June 1942 (attached to 1st Bombardment Wing from 2 December 1942, 8th Air Force from 16 February 1943)
- 7th Photographic Reconnaissance and Mapping Group, 7 July 1943
- Unknown 21 November 1945 – 1 December 1945 (Note: Probably New York Port of Embarkation on arrival at Camp Kilmer.)
- 65th Reconnaissance Group, 6 July 1947 – 27 June 1949
- 65th Troop Carrier Group, 14 June 1952 – 1 April 1953
- 374th Tactical Airlift Wing, 1 October 1987
- 316th Airlift Support Group, 1 April 1992
- 18th Operations Group, 1 June 1992
- 438th Operations Group, 1 October 1993
- 305th Operations Group, 1 October 1994 – 31 March 2000
- 610th Regional Support Group, 12 March 2005
- 940th Operations Group, 1 July 2009
- 726th Operations Group, 10 February 2016 – present

=== Stations ===
- Army Air Base Colorado Springs, Colorado, 20 June – 17 October 1942
- RAF Podington, England, 2 December 1942
- RAF Mount Farm, England, 16 February 1943
- RAF Chalgrove, England, 8 April 1945
- RAF Grove, England, c. 13 October – 23 November 1945
- Camp Kilmer, New Jersey, 30 November – 1 December 1945
- Rome Army Air Field, New York, 6 July 1947
- Chemung County Airport, New York, 26 January 1948 – 27 June 1949
- Mitchel Air Force Base, New York, 14 June 1952 – 1 April 1953
- Kadena Air Base, Japan, 1 October 1987
- McGuire Air Force Base, New Jersey, 1 October 1993 – 31 March 2000
- Beale Air Force Base, California, 12 March 2005 – present

=== Aircraft ===
- Lockheed P-38 Lightning (1942–1945)
- Piper L-4 Grasshopper (1942–1943)
- Supermarine Spitfire (1943)
- North American P-51 Mustang (1945)
- Curtiss C-46 Commando (1952–1953)
- Beechcraft C-12 Huron (1987–1993)
- Lockheed C-141 Starlifter (1993–2000)
- Northrop Grumman RQ-4 Global Hawk (2005–present)
