= 315 (disambiguation) =

315 may refer to:

- 315 (year)
- 315 BC, a calendar year
- 315 (number), the natural number following 314 and preceding 316
- Project 315, a nonprofit in Israel
- NGC 315, an elliptical galaxy
- 315th Operations Group, a military unit
- 315th Air Division, a military unit
- 315th Airlift Wing, a military unit
- 315th Cyberspace Operations Squadron, a military unit
- 315th Rifle Division (Soviet Union), a former military unit
- 315th Fighter Squadron, a military unit
- 315 Constantia, a main-belt asteroid
- 315 series, a Japanese train type
- NCR 315, a 1962 second-generation computer

== See also ==
- 315th (disambiguation)
