= Second Holocaust =

The notion of a second Holocaust (Note: (Hebrew: השואה השנײה, romanized: HaShoah HaShniyah) or "Another Holocaust" (Hebrew: שואה נוספת, romanized: Shoah Nosephet)) refers to the belief or claim that the Holocaust – or an event comparable in scale, intent, or destructive potential – is recurring or is likely to occur again in the future. This concept is invoked in a wide range of political, cultural, and scholarly discussions, particularly those concerning the security and continuity of the State of Israel, the safety of Jewish communities worldwide, and the preservation of Jewish cultural and religious life.

Advocates of this view often point to rising antisemitism, geopolitical conflicts, demographic concerns, or hostile rhetoric from state and non-state actors as indicators of renewed existential danger. Critics, however, argue that applying Holocaust analogies too broadly can distort historical understanding, escalate political tensions, or hinder constructive debate. As a result, the phrase is both deeply emotive and highly contested, reflecting broader debates about memory, identity, and the interpretation of past atrocities in contemporary contexts.

== Origin ==
The Holocaust was the genocide of Jews perpetrated by Nazi Germany during World War II. It was a state-sponsored, systematic campaign of persecution and murder carried out between 1941 and 1945 under the totalitarian dictatorship of Adolf Hitler. Rooted in antisemitic ideology, Nazi racial policy labeled Jews as an existential threat to the German nation. Following years of escalating discrimination, including the Nuremberg Laws in 1935 and the Kristallnacht in 1938, the regime transitioned from exclusion to extermination with the so-called Final Solution.

The genocide was implemented through a network of ghettos, forced-labor camps, and extermination camps across German-occupied Europe. Millions of Jews were deported in mass transports to killing centers such as Auschwitz-Birkenau, Treblinka, Sobibór, and Belzec, where they were murdered primarily in gas chambers. Mobile killing units (Einsatzgruppen) also carried out mass shootings, particularly in Eastern Europe. By the end of the war, approximately six million Jewish men, women, and children had been killed—around two-thirds of Europe’s prewar Jewish population. The Holocaust also targeted other groups deemed “undesirable,” including Roma, disabled individuals, Poles, Soviet POWs, and political opponents, though Jews remained the central target of total annihilation.

The Holocaust stands as one of the most extensively documented genocides in history, and its legacy continues to shape global discussions on human rights and the responsibilities of states and societies in preventing mass atrocities.

== Examples ==
=== Existential threats to the State of Israel ===
Threats to Israel's security have often been described as a potential "second Holocaust". During the 1948 Arab–Israeli War, it was feared that defeat in the war would mean a second genocide of Jews, this time at the hands of Arab armies. These fears were based on antisemitism in the Arab world, the fact that Arab leaders such as Amin al-Husseini were providing shelter to Nazi war criminals and had publicly supported the Holocaust during World War 2, many Israelis having lost relatives in the Holocaust, and the temporal proximity of the last genocide. The Arabs did not face a comparable existential threat, and the lack of motivation of Arab armies contributed to defeat in the war. The Six-Day War also led Israelis to fear another Holocaust.

Belief that Jews are threatened by another existential event, like the Holocaust, is an important element in support for the Israeli state and its military. For example, in 1987, Yitzhak Rabin opined that "In every generation, they try to destroy us" (quoting from the Passover Haggadah) and therefore the Holocaust could happen again. Before he came to power, Menachem Begin compared accepting reparations from Germany to allowing "another Holocaust". Before the 1982 Lebanon war, Begin told his cabinet: "Believe me, the alternative to this is Treblinka, and we have decided that there will not be another Treblinka". He also justified Operation Opera, the 1981 bombing of an Iraqi nuclear reactor, by stating that by ordering the strike he had prevented another Holocaust.

Mike Pence, former Vice President of the United States, said in 2019 that "The Iranian regime openly advocates another Holocaust and seeks the means to achieve it", referring to the Iranian nuclear program.

This tendency has been criticized by some Israelis. For example, in 2017 President Reuven Rivlin said that he disagreed with Begin's invocation of "another Treblinka": "According to this approach, the justification for the existence of the State of Israel is the prevention of the next Holocaust. Every threat is a threat to survival, every Israel-hating leader is Hitler ... any criticism of the State of Israel is anti-Semitism." He said that the approach was "fundamentally wrong" and "dangerous".

The October 7 attacks in 2023 have been likened to events of the Holocaust by many Israeli Jews, including Holocaust survivors, as well as world leaders such as the Israeli prime minister Benjamin Netanyahu and the US president Joe Biden. The phenomenon of Israel's Holocaust survivors mourning much-younger soldiers lost on October 7 was described as a reversal of roles.

Following Israel's strike on Iran's nuclear infrastructure in June 2025, Netanyahu said on American television, "We will not have a second holocaust, a nuclear holocaust”.

=== One-state solution ===
Writing for Arutz Sheva in 2008, Steven Plaut referred to a one-state solution for the Israeli-Palestinian conflict as the "Rwanda Solution", arguing that the implementation of a solution in which a Palestinian majority would rule over a Jewish minority would eventually lead to a "new Holocaust".

=== Antisemitism ===
Some Holocaust survivors have expressed fear that rising antisemitism in the 21st century could lead to another Holocaust. Israel Meir Lau, former Ashkenazi Chief Rabbi of Israel and a Holocaust survivor, said that while another Holocaust was possible, "this time, the fact that we have a Jewish state that deters Israel's haters, the fact that we have the Israel Defense Forces, and the fact that we have won wars decisively, makes things starkly different".

According to a 2020 survey, 58% of Americans believe something like the Holocaust could happen again.

=== Claims that Palestinians are committing genocide ===
A 2009 law journal article by Israeli-American human rights lawyer Justus Weiner and Israeli-American law professor Avi Bell argued that Hamas attacks against Israelis met the definition of the crime of genocide in the Genocide Convention. In 2023, a letter signed by over 100 international law experts argued that the October 7 attacks "most probably constitute[s] an international crime of genocide, proscribed by the Genocide Convention and the Rome Statute of the International Criminal Court". Its signatories included Irwin Cotler, former Attorney-General of Canada; the organiser of the letter was Dan Eldad, former acting State Attorney of Israel. The same argument was made by Jens David Ohlin, dean of Cornell Law School, in a post on the Opinio Juris group blog.

In his 2009 book on genocide, Worse than War: Genocide, Eliminationism, and the Ongoing Assault on Humanity, Harvard professor Daniel Goldhagen argues that Palestinian suicide attacks should be called "genocide bombings", and their perpetrators "genocide bombers". The coining of the label "genocide bombing" is sometimes attributed to Irwin Cotler, in remarks he made in the Canadian Parliament in 2002; however, the phrase was used by the UK's ambassador, Stephen Gommersall, during an April 1996 meeting of the UN Security Council. Other supporters of the use of the "genocide bombing" phrase have included the American political scientist R. J. Rummel, and Arnold Beichman.

=== Jewish intermarriage ===
In 2019, Israeli education minister Rafi Peretz compared Jewish intermarriage in the United States to a "second Holocaust". At the time, 58% of married American Jews had non-Jewish spouses. Jonathan Greenblatt, director of the Anti-Defamation League, said that Peretz' remark "trivializes the Shoah".

== See also ==
- Calls for the destruction of Israel – Question of whether Israeli political authority is legitimate or not
- Allegations of genocide in the October 7 attacks – Characterization of Hamas atrocities
- Palestinian genocide accusation
- Gaza genocide – Ongoing genocide in the Gaza Strip
- Genocide prevention – Any act or actions that works toward averting future genocides
- Great Replacement conspiracy theory – Conspiracy theory about race and culture
- Never again – Phrase associated with the Holocaust
- Ongoing Nakba – Term for the ongoing trauma of the Palestinian people
- Instrumentalization of the Holocaust – Invocation of the Holocaust for political gain
- New Hitler – Phrase to compare public figures to Adolf Hitler
