= 315th Regiment =

315th Regiment may refer to:

- 315th Cavalry Regiment, United States
- 315th (North Midland) Medium Regiment, Royal Artillery

== See also ==
- 315th (disambiguation)
