= Project 315 =

Israeli nonprofit organization

The 315 Project – Citizens for Truth
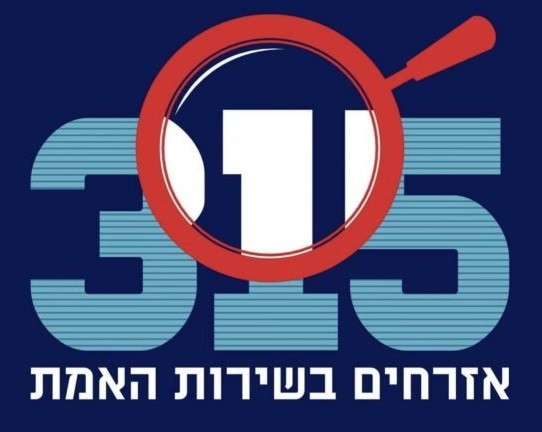
- Established: 2021
- Type: Nonprofit Organization
- Leader: Guy Levi, Moshik Kovarsky, Adi Szabo, Moshe Malal
- Website: www.the315.org

The 315 Project – Citizens for Truth (פרויקט 315) is a volunteer-based in Israel whose main purpose that aims to investigate the nature and content of 315 news publications mentioned in the indictment of the Case 4000 trial, in which Prime Minister Benjamin Netanyahu who is accused of 'unusual responsiveness' during the runup to their publication at the Israeli news portal Walla. The 'unusual responsiveness' related to the 315 online publications is claimed to constitute a bribe by Israeli state prosecutors in the case. The project's main aim is to investigate the truthfulness and validity of the prosecutors' claims related to the publications. The project was initiated by Israeli entrepreneur and Member of Netanyahu's party, Likud, Guy Levy. Levy, and the other leaders of the project, were Netanyahu supporters

== Background ==
The original indictment in the case (given the number 4000) was presented to the district court of Jerusalem on January 28, 2020, and included the charges of "bribery, fraud and breach of trust." However, on December 14 of the same year the court requested the prosecution to correct the indictment due to essential flaws. In total, the state attorney was requested to correct 50 clauses. Concerning the bribe clause, the state attorney was requested to add an addendum detailing all the press events related to the claim that Benjamin Netanyahu requested more favorable coverage from the online Walla! news portal (the original bribe was defined as 'positive press coverage'). In the corrected indictment of case-4000, the bribery clause was modified to describe 'unusual responsiveness' as the bribe instead of positive press coverage, and the addendum added by the state attorney included 315 cases which were claimed to constitute the bribe.

== Project origins ==
Founders of Project 315, top right: Moshik Kobersky, Dr. Adi Sabo. Bottom right: Guy Levy and Moshe Malal, 2022

Guy Levy, a publicist and social activist, read the indictment's addendum after its public release. During the examination it came to his attention that case num. 11 in the addendum described a request to cover an Israeli Forbes article nominating Sara Netanyahu (wife of Benjamin Netanyahu) as the most powerful woman in Israel. Levy recalled that the Forbes article was also covered by Channel 2 and that the story's coverage by Walla was not unusual. It was later revealed that the content at Walla was hostile, that the story was covered by at least 17 press outlets, and that Walla had been covering the Forbes annual 'Most Powerful Woman' nomination for several years. This led to the conclusion that case number 11 (out of 315) wasn't scrutinized by the state attorney's office, which led to an examination of additional cases.

Guy Levy joined forces with Moshik Kovarsky, Adi Szabo, Moshe Mallal, and dozens of volunteers to thoroughly scrutinize all 315 cases included in the indictment addendum. The project's team uncovered cases where the state attorney claimed that requests to retract publications had been accepted when, in reality, the publications remained online indefinitely. In other cases where the state attorney claimed that story coverage requests were accepted, it was revealed that the stories weren't covered at all by Walla. In other cases, claims that editing requests were fulfilled by the site turned out to not have occurred. In one case, it was even revealed that a presumed demand to retract a publication was not related to Benjamin Netanyahu, but to the Israeli former politician Silvan Shalom.

Other publication requests that were accepted appeared in dozens of other news outlets simultaneously and were mainly regular spokesman announcements.

== Project activity ==
=== Video media ===
The project's members filmed 30 video clips where each video describes a case or several cases out of the 315 indictment cases, and their refutation. Additionally, other subjects are discussed in the clips such as the phenomenon of demands for positive coverage at Walla by other politicians, and other issues related to the press-dubbed 'thousands of cases'.

== Case 4000 ==
The project's members transferred their findings to the defense team of the case-4000 trial, and to a media company. Some of the findings were used during cross-examinations of prosecution witnesses.

== Findings ==
The findings proved that the state prosecution team did not examine the vast majority of 315 cases added to the indictment. The cases were claimed to constitute a bribe due to 'unusual responsiveness' related to their publication: In 136 cases it was claimed that publication requests by Netanyahu were accepted when, in reality, no such publications occurred. In 155 cases it was claimed that the responsiveness of the Walla site to Netanyahu's requests was 'unusual'. However, it was proved that such requests were routinely accepted by many other press outlets, or that they had already been covered by the press in the past. In 13 cases Benjamin Netanyahu was not involved, despite opposite claims in the indictment. In 5 cases, the number of details was insufficient to establish whether responsiveness existed and whether it was 'unusual.' In 6 cases, requests sent by Netanyahu were accepted exclusively by Walla.

== Crisis ==
In some cases, the project staff claimed that the section according to which an article was uploaded to the Walla website following a demand was false, since the article was not uploaded to Walla. In an interview on the Yinon Magal and Ben Caspit show, Ben Caspit asked Guy Levy for clarification regarding such a clause, in light of the fact that the clause indicated that the demand had been shelved. Guy Levy replied: "The article didn't come up, how does that sit in an indictment of unusual responsiveness?"

In response to the question of why the indictment included cases in which the request was not answered on the Walla website, lawyer Shahar Ben Meir published in the media a response article according to which the project staff misinterpreted the phrase "unusual responsiveness" in the indictment. According to this claim, the indictment specifically states that the unusual responsiveness to Netanyahu was from the Elovitch couple, and not necessarily from the Walla website, and therefore those cases where the demand was ultimately not met on the Walla website, can still be considered an unusual responsiveness from Elovitch. Elovitch's compliance, according to this opinion, is expressed in the fact that he turned to the Walla people and exerted pressure on them, and this is also true for cases where the Walla people managed to escape from fulfilling Elovitch's demand. Ben Meir even claimed that cases in which a demand was raised for coverage of events that were also covered by other media outlets, can also be considered as an unusual responsiveness. According to this opinion, the exception may actually be the personal involvement of Elovitch as the owner of the website in handling the demand, and the scope of this involvement, even regardless of the fact that other media also published the same news.

Another critical claim that came up in the media concerns certain cases, in which the project staff claimed that sections according to which an article was removed following a demand were incorrect, since the article still exists on the website. According to this claim, the people of the project based their words on a wrong, or unnecessary, interpretation of the meaning of the term "removal of an article" on a news website.
