= New Hitler =

Phrase to compare public figures to Adolf Hitler

New Hitler is a phrase used in popular culture, political rhetoric, journalism, and academic analysis to strongly negative compare contemporary public figures to Adolf Hitler, the Austria-born dictator who led Nazi Germany under totalitarian rule from 1933 until his suicide in 1945, and who was responsible for industrialized genocide (most notably in the Holocaust), totalitarian repression, aggressive expansionism, and the global catastrophe of World War II. Because Hitler represents one of history's clearest examples of moral and political atrocity, as well as a powerful symbol of evil and authoritarianism, the label "New Hitler" is used exclusively as a condemnation.

== Origin ==
Adolf Hitler was the Austria-born dictator of Nazi Germany from 30 January 1933 until 30 April 1945, when he committed suicide. Nazi Germany was defeated in World War II and surrendered on 8 May 1945. As the leader of the Nazi Party, Hitler ruled Germany as a totalitarian dictatorship, which was responsible for the systematic persecution and mass murder of millions, especially in the Holocaust, the murder of 6 million Jews. Owing to the unparalleled destruction and human suffering associated with his rule, Hitler’s name has become a universal symbol of tyranny and genocidal authoritarianism.

Because of this legacy, the expression "New Hitler" emerged in political discourse after World War II as a rhetorical label applied to contemporary leaders perceived as dangerously authoritarian or aggressively expansionist. The term is most commonly used by journalists, political commentators, or activists to draw comparisons—often hyperbolic—between the historical figure of Hitler and modern figures accused of exhibiting similar patterns of behavior. These comparisons typically involve allegations of extreme nationalism, suppression of civil liberties, state propaganda, or large-scale human rights abuses. While the term can serve as a moral warning, it is also widely criticized for oversimplifying political situations and for diminishing the historical singularity of the Holocaust.

Scholars of political communication note that the phrase "New Hitler" is frequently used in sensational or polemical contexts and may distort public understanding of both past and present events. Critics argue that such analogies risk trivializing the crimes of Nazi Germany or weaponizing history for partisan purposes, while supporters claim the comparison serves as a cautionary tool intended to highlight early signs of dangerous extremism. As a result, the expression remains highly controversial, with ongoing debates about its appropriateness, accuracy, and impact on political discourse.

== Usage in political discourse ==
In politics, the phrase is often cited in discussions related to Godwin's law, as critics draw parallels—sometimes rhetorically, sometimes analytically—between current leaders and Hitler's destructive rule and totalitarianism. Such comparisons generally aim to highlight perceived authoritarianism, militarism, or human-rights abuses.

=== Vladimir Putin ===
Following Russia's 2022 invasion of Ukraine, some political figures and commentators have likened Russian president Vladimir Putin to Hitler, emphasizing concerns about territorial aggression and disregard for civilian life. For example, Czech politician Miloš Vystrčil said Putin was "acting like Adolf Hitler" during the war. In addition, German defence minister Boris Pistorius compared Putin's war aims to Hitler's 1938 annexations such as the Anschluss and the Munich Agreement. British defence secretary Ben Wallace also argued that Putin's "fascism and tyranny" mirror Nazi behavior. Meanwhile, analysts have scrutinized how Putin uses the legacy of WWII to shape his narrative, though some of his claims, such as Putin's claim that one of his goals is what he calls the "denazification" of Ukraine, are treated as propaganda.

=== Ali Khamenei ===
In 2017, Saudi crown prince Mohammed bin Salman referred to Iran's supreme leader Ali Khamenei as the "new Hitler of the Middle East", framing Iran's regional policies as dangerously expansionist, warning against appeasement.

=== Far-right politicians ===
Certain figures in far-right movements are sometimes labeled "new Hitlers". For example, Björn Höcke, a prominent member of Germany's Alternative for Germany (AfD), has been associated with extremist rhetoric and been labeled by opponents as “Nazis” or "Germany’s new Hitler" in response to rhetoric perceived as extremist or revisionist. While “new Hitler” is a charged metaphor, courts have taken serious issue with his language: he was fined €13,000 for using the Nazi slogan "Alles für Deutschland" ("Everything for Germany").

=== Donald Trump ===
Critics of US president Donald Trump have occasionally invoked Hitler in describing his (according to them) authoritarian tendencies. According to former chief of staff John Kelly, Trump once said, "You know, Hitler did some good things, too." Kelly claims Trump admired Hitler's economic rebuilding: "[Hitler] rebuilt the economy … but … he turned it against his own people," Kelly recalled. Kelly also said Trump expressed a desire for "the kind of generals that Hitler had." However, fact-checking outlets note that these claims come from secondhand accounts—Kelly's recollections—and there is no known audio or video proof of Trump's alleged remarks.

== In popular culture and academic contexts ==
The phrase "New Hitler" also appears in literature, media, and historical scholarship, typically as a way to examine the enduring impact of totalitarianism or to explore hypothetical scenarios involving authoritarian leaders, as well as the dangers of extremist ideology and unchecked power. The term has also been used in academic works that study the conditions under which future dictators might arise. Related expressions appear in discussions of extremist groups advocating for a so-called "Fourth Reich" or reviving Nazi ideology.

A British comic titled The New Adventures of Hitler, published in Crisis magazine, explored a speculative story in which Hitler spent time in Liverpool before World War I. The authors used this premise as social satire.

In technology, an incident involving the AI chatbot Grok made headlines when it began briefly referring to itself as "MechaHitler" and posting pro-Hitler comments, prompting public backlash, illustrating the continued sensitivity surrounding any use of Nazi-related imagery. The firm was forced to delete the comments, which included racist and antisemitic comments.

Historically, as early as 1933, a British report questioned whether Hitler was genuinely moderating his views upon taking office or whether he remained the same extremist described in Mein Kampf. The outbreak of World War II confirmed that Hitler had never abandoned the violent and destructive intentions outlined in his writings.

== See also ==
- Second Holocaust
- Godwin's law
