= 324th Intelligence Squadron =

324th Intelligence Squadron

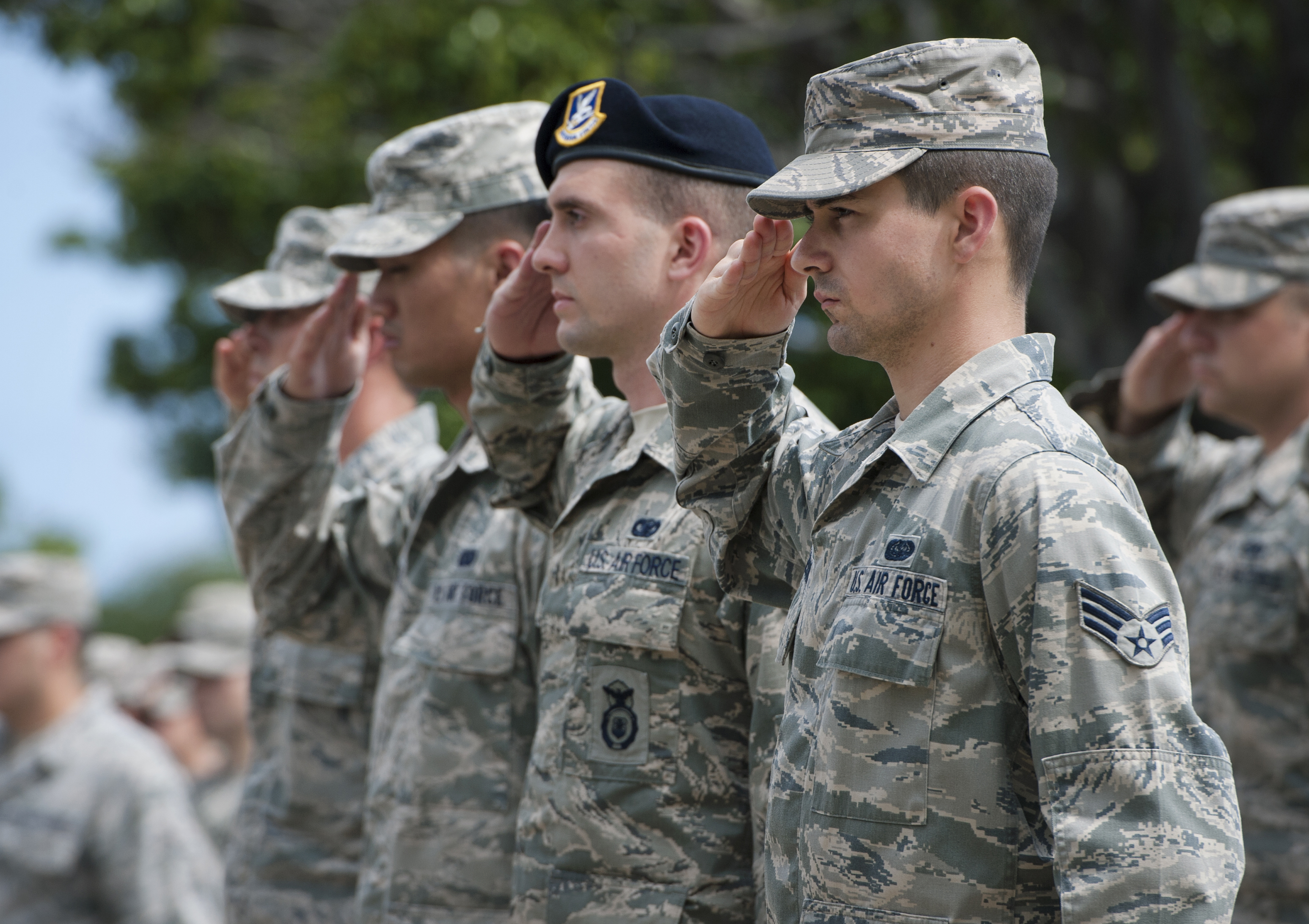
- A squadron airmen participates in a memorial service with other airmen at Joint Base Pearl Harbor–Hickam
- Active: 1943-1945; 1952; 1952–1958; 1980-present
- Country: United States
- Branch: United States Air Force
- Type: Intelligence
- Role: Intelligence collection
- Part of: AFISRA/692 ISR Group
- Garrison/HQ: Joint Base Pearl Harbor–Hickam, Hawaii
- Motto(s): Vigilance in Action
- Engagements: European Theater of Operations
- Decorations: Air Force Outstanding Unit Award with Combat "V" Device; Air force Outstanding Unit Award

Insignia
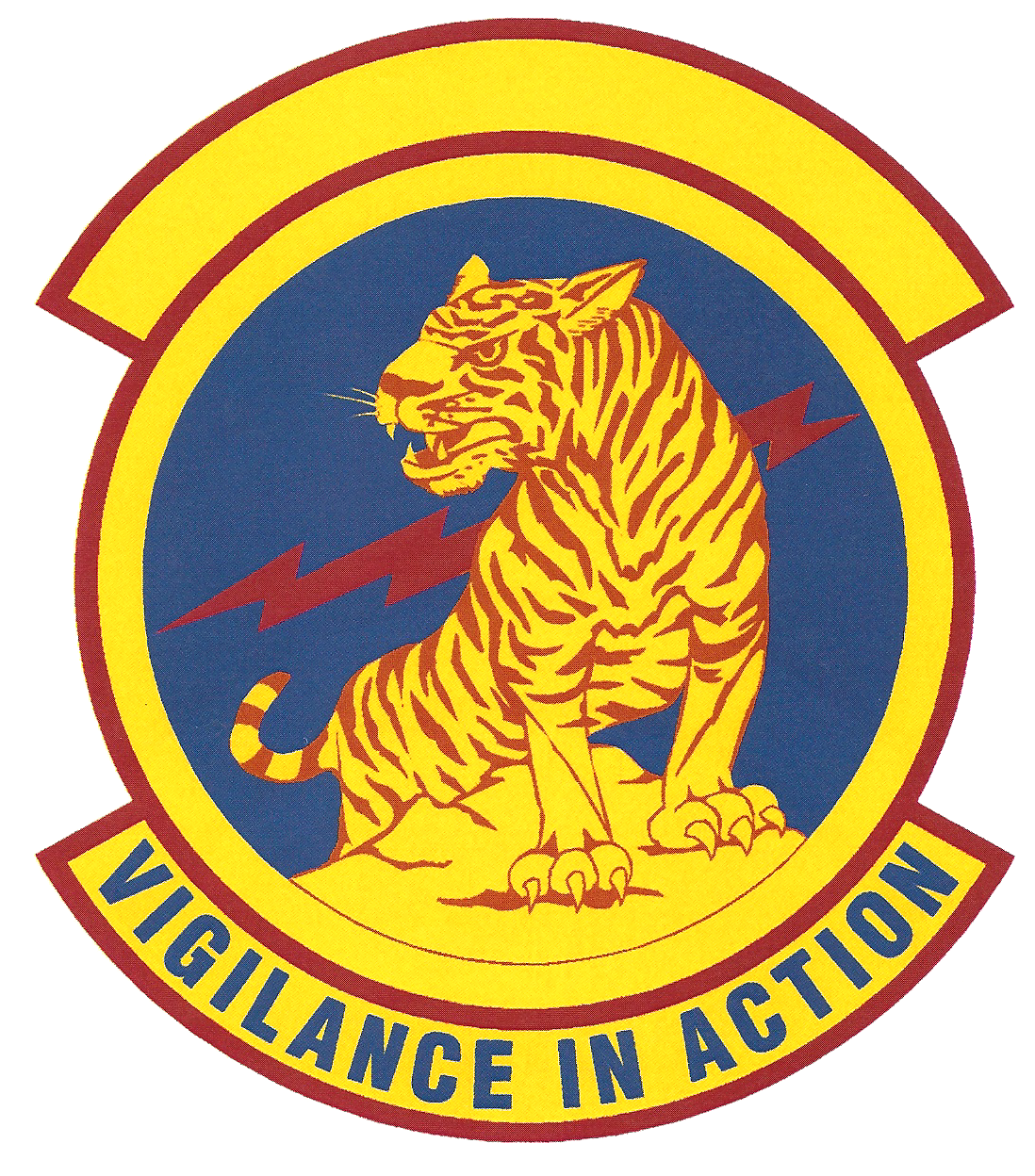
- 324th Intelligence Squadron emblem (approved 28 March 2012)

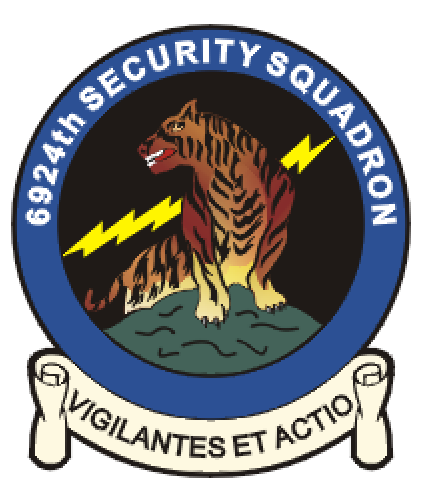
- 6924th Security Squadron emblem (approved 16 August 1967) (Note: This emblem was approved for the 6924th Security Squadron on 16 August 1967. It was used without authorization by the 6924th Electronic Security Squadron, but was grandfathered for continued use by the 324th. Bailey, Factsheet, 324th Intelligence Squadron.)

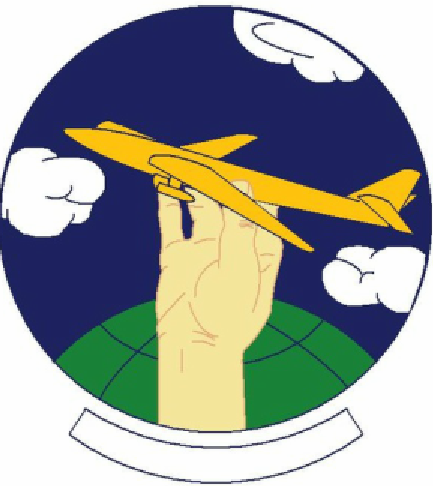
- 815th Reconnaissance Technical Sq emblem

The United States Air Force's 324th Intelligence Squadron is an intelligence unit located at Joint Base Pearl Harbor–Hickam, Hawaii.

== History ==
=== World War II ===
The first predecessor of the squadron was the 1st Photographic Lab Section, which was activated in October 1943 at Will Rogers Field, Oklahoma. After training in the United States, it served with Ninth Air Force in the European Theater of Operations until V-E Day, advancing across Northern Europe with American Forces. It remained in Germany as part of the occupation forces until inactivating in November 1945.

=== Strategic reconnaissance ===
The 90th Reconnaissance Technical Squadron was activated at Forbes Air Force Base, Kansas in June 1952 to provide processing and interpretation of reconnaissance products for the 90th Strategic Reconnaissance Wing. In the fall of that year a second reconnaissance wing became operational at Forbes, and the 90th was replaced by the 815th Reconnaissance Technical Squadron, which supported the 90th and 55th Strategic Reconnaissance Wings until inactivating in the summer of 1958. These two squadrons and the World War II era 1st Photographic Technical Unit were consolidated into a single unit in October 1984 and given the designation 24 Reconnaissance Technical Squadron.

=== Intelligence support in Hawaii ===
In 1980, Electronic Security Command organized the 6924th Electronic Security Squadron at Wheeler Air Force Base, Hawaii. In the 1990s, the Air Force eliminated units whose organization was controlled by its Major Commands (MAJCON or 4-digit units) The 6924th was converted to an Air Force controlled unit by consolidating it with the 24 Reconnaissance Technical Squadron (which had never been active with this designation) as the 324 Intelligence Squadron.

== Lineage ==
1st Photographic Technical Unit

- Constituted as the 1st Photographic Lab Section on 9 October 1943

Activated on 20 October 1943
Redesignated 1st Photographic Technical Unit on 13 October 1944
Inactivated on 30 September 1945

- Consolidated with the 90th Reconnaissance Technical Squadron and the 815th Reconnaissance Technical Squadron as the 24th Reconnaissance Technical Squadron on 16 October 1984

90th Reconnaissance Technical Squadron

- Constituted as the 90th Reconnaissance Technical Squadron on 4 June 1952

Activated on 16 June 1952
Inactivated on 16 October 1952

- Consolidated with the 1st Photographic Technical Unit and the 815th Reconnaissance Technical Squadron as the 24 Reconnaissance Technical Squadron on 16 October 1984

815th Reconnaissance Technical Squadron

- Constituted as the 815th Reconnaissance Technical Squadron on 28 August 1952

Activated on 16 October 1952
Inactivated on 11 July 1958

- Consolidated with the 1st Photographic Technical Unit and the 90th Reconnaissance Technical Squadron as the 24 Reconnaissance Technical Squadron on 16 October 1984
- Consolidated with the 6924 Electronic Security Squadron as the 324 Intelligence Squadron on 1 October 1993

324th Intelligence Squadron

- Designated as the 6924th Electronic Security Squadron and activated on 1 August 1980 (Note: The 6924th Electronic Security Squadron is not related to the 6924th Security Squadron that was organized at Da Nang Air Base on 1 October 1965, moved to Ramusan Station, Japan c. January 1973 and to Kunia Air Force Station in May 1976 and was discontinued on 1 August 1979. See note on emblem. Bailey, Factsheet, 324th Intelligence Squadron.)

Redesignated 6924th Electronic Security Group on 1 August 1986

- Consolidated with the 24th Reconnaissance Technical Squadron as the 324 Intelligence Squadron on 1 October 1993

=== Assignments ===
- 8th Photographic Reconnaissance Group, 20 October 1943
- III Reconnaissance Command, 15 January 1944
- Ninth Air Force, c. 6 Mar 1944
- Eighth Air Force, c. 14 March 1944
- Ninth Air Force, 26 May 1944
- XIX Tactical Air Command, 5 November 1944
- 10th Reconnaissance Group, 4 July–30 September 1945
- 90th Strategic Reconnaissance Wing, 16 June–16 October 1952
- 815th Air Base Group, 16 October 1952 – 11 July 1958
- Electronic Security, Pacific (later Pacific Electronic Security Division, 692d Intelligence Wing, 692d Intelligence Group, 692 Information Operations Group, 692 Intelligence Group, 692d Intelligence, Surveillance and Reconnaissance Group), 1 August 1980 – present

=== Stations ===
- Will Rogers Field, Oklahoma 20 October 1943 – 12 February 1944
- Liverpool, England, 6 March 1944
- RAF Chalgrove (Sta 465), England, by 6 April 1944
- Chantilly (Y-65), France, by. November 1944
- Conflans Airfield (A-94), France, by December 1944
- Sandweiler, Luxembourg (A-97), by March 1945
- Cham, Germany (R-64), by April 1945
- Fürth Airfield (R-28), Germany, by May 1945 – 30 September 1945
- Forbes Air Force Base, Kansas, 16 June–16 October 1952
- Forbes Air Force Base, Kansas, 16 October 1952 – 11 July 1958
- Wheeler Air Force Base, Hawaii, 1 August 1980 – present

== Decorations ==
- Air Force Outstanding Unit Award
  - 1 October 2004 – 31 May 2005
  - 1 June 2003 – 30 September 2004
  - 1 June 2002 – 31 May 2003 (w/Combat "V" device)
  - 1 June 2001 – 31 May 2002
  - 1 October 1999 – 30 September 2000
  - 1 October 1997 – 30 September 1998
  - 1 October 1994 – 30 September 1995
  - 1 October 1993 – 30 September 1994
  - 1 July 1991 – 4 December 1991
  - 1 July 1981 – 30 June 1983
