= Dina Doron =

Israeli actress (born 1940)

- דינה דורון
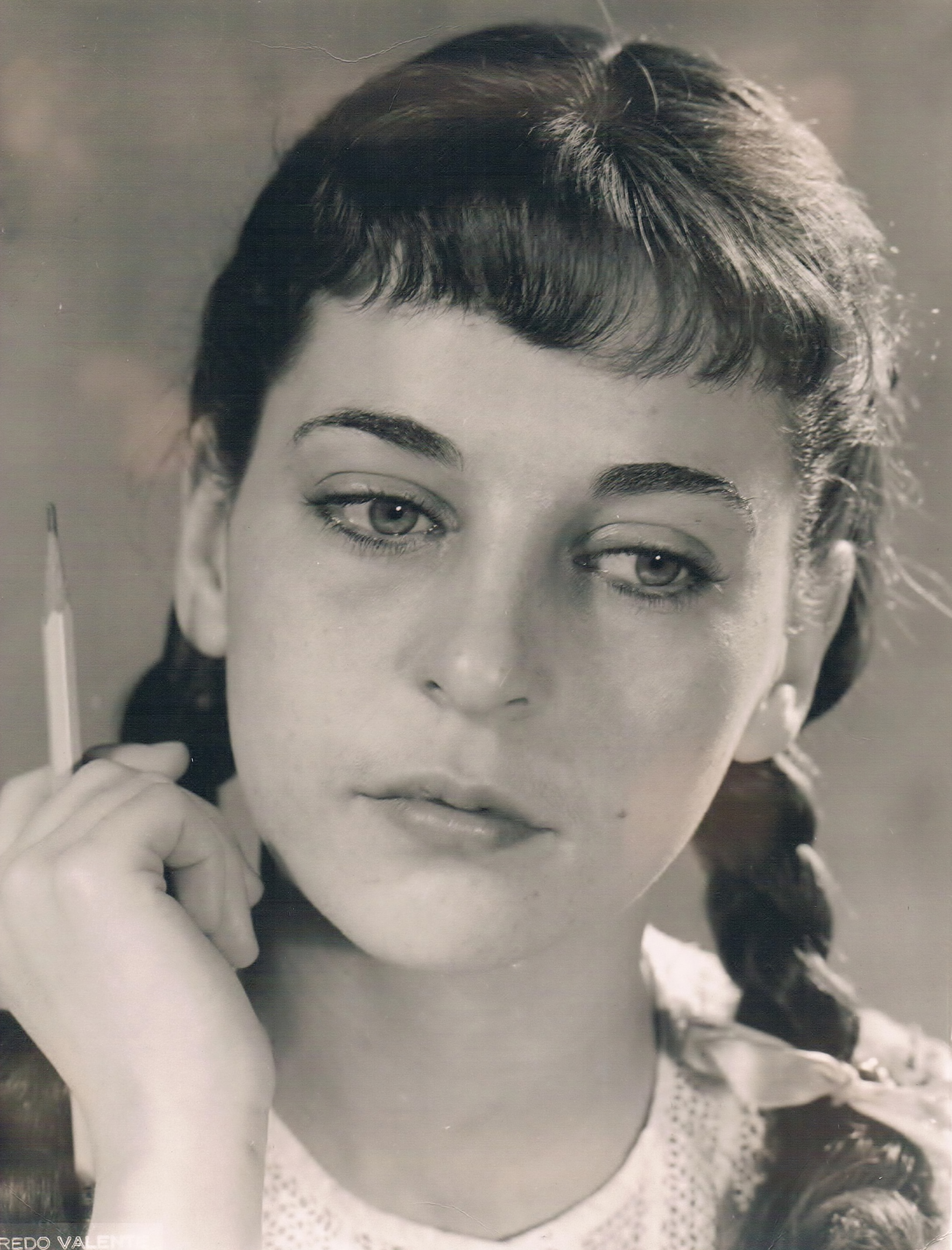
- Doron as Anne Frank in the Broadway production The Diary of Anne Frank in 1956.
- Born: Dina Peskin; 15 March 1940 (age 86); Afula, Mandatory Palestine
- Occupation: Actress
- Children: 2 (including Dan)

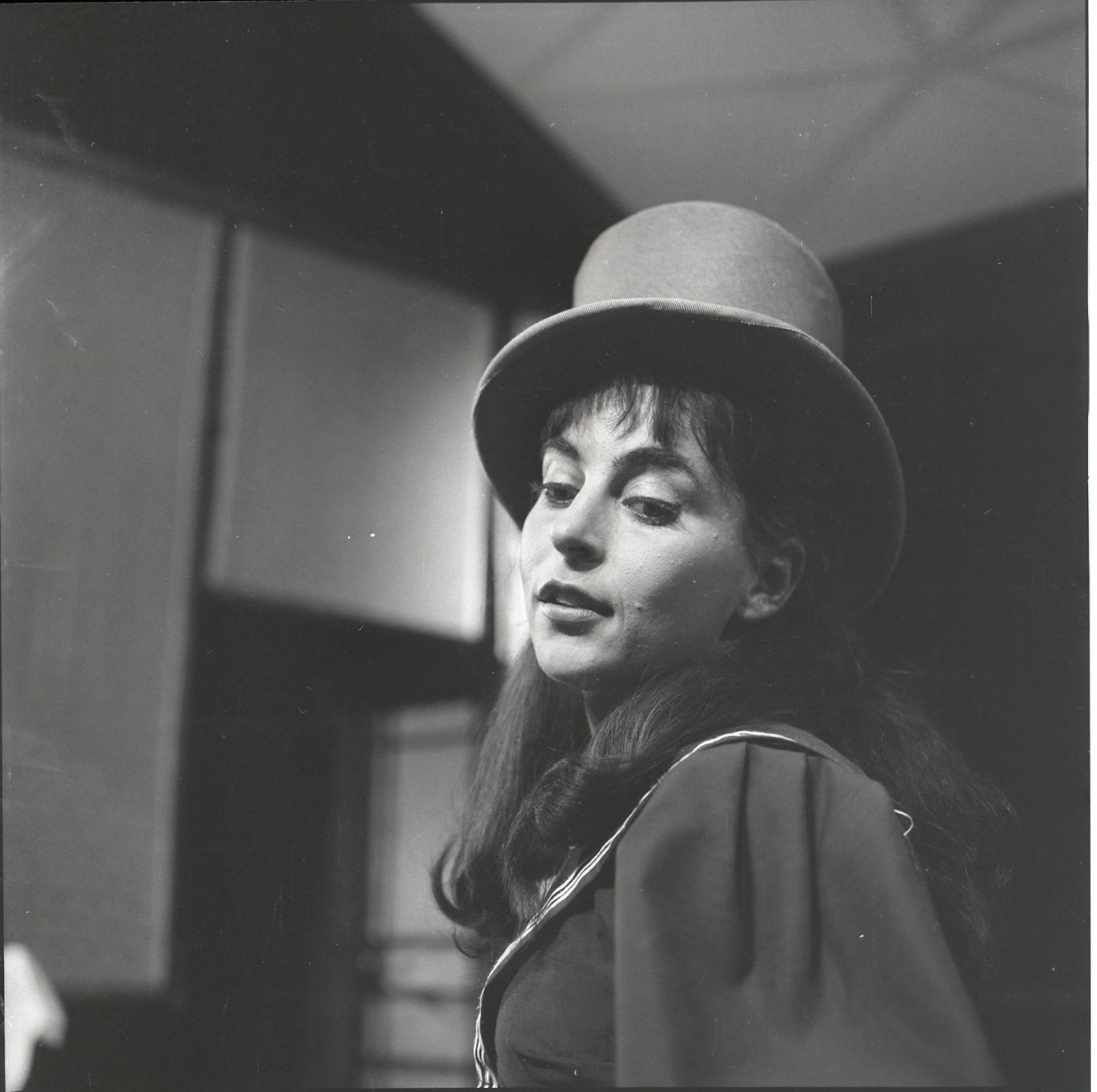
Dina Doron, 1962, Boris Carmi, Meitar collection, National Library of Israel

Dina Peskin, known professionally as Dina Doron and Dina Doronne, (Hebrew: דינה דורון; born 15 March 1940) is an Israeli film and stage actress.

== Biography ==
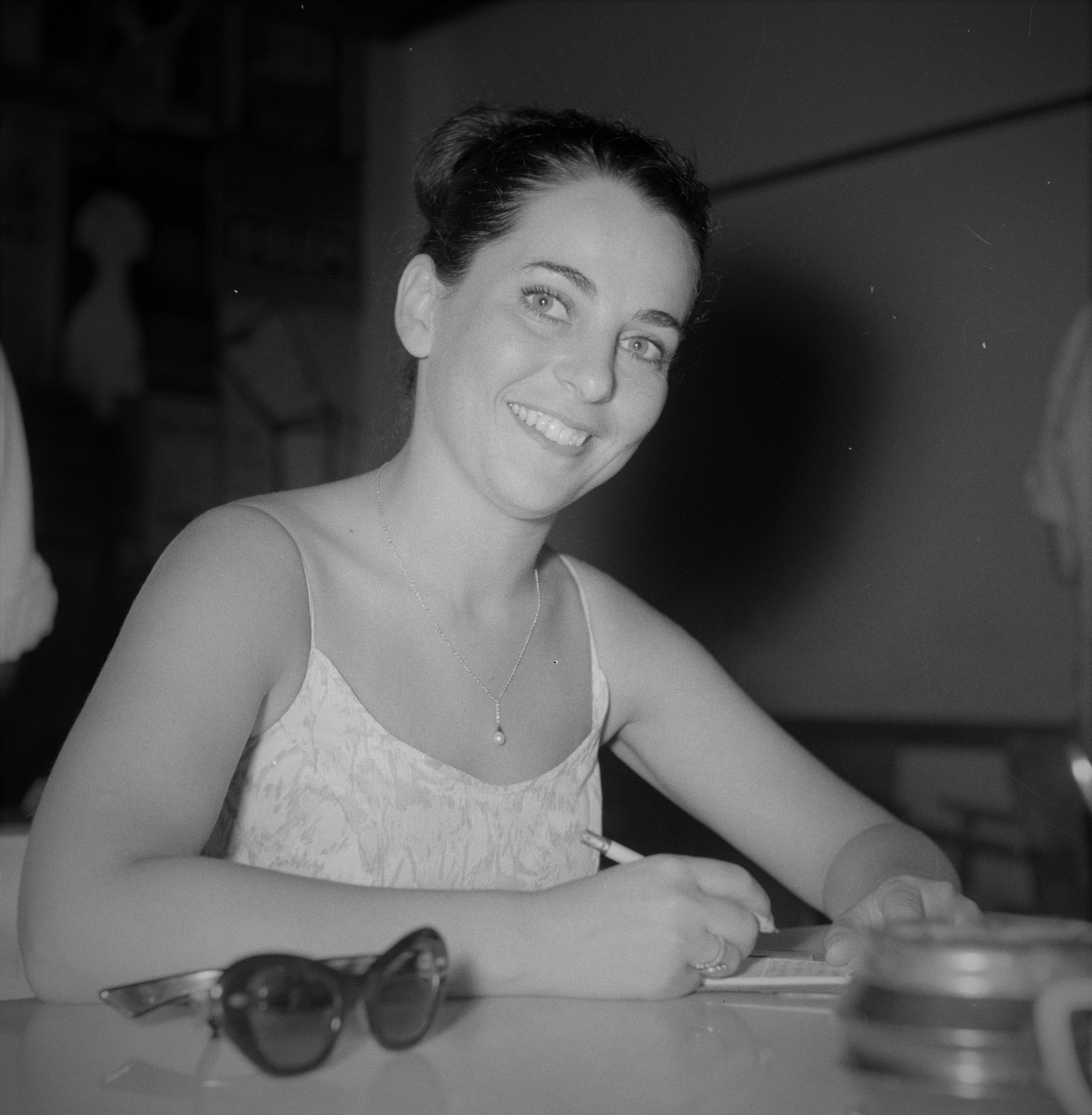
Doron in 1964

Doron was born in Afula, Mandatory Palestine on 15 March 1940 to Zivia and Emanuel Peskin. Doron is Jewish. She has often portrayed Jewish women throughout her career. She moved to New York to study theatre and dance in the 1950s. She trained in modern dance at the Martha Graham School. Her American theatre debut was on Broadway as Anne Frank in the play The Diary of Anne Frank. She went on to have a career as a film actress, starring in Israeli and French films including The Faithful City, The Glass Cage, Late Marriage, and A Tale of Love and Darkness. Doron returned to the stage in 2016 to portray Billy Elliot's grandmother in Billy Elliot the Musical at the Cinema City Gelilot Complex in Israel. In 2017, she voiced the role, both speaking and singing, of Mamá Coco in Pixar's Hebrew version of the digitally animated film Coco. As part of the cast of Coco, she sang on the Hebrew version of the track Remember Me, which won Best Original Song at the 90th Academy Awards in 2018. She was cast in the 2020 Netflix original miniseries Unorthodox, which premiered on 26 March 2020.

== Personal life ==
Doron married Serbian film producer Ilan Eldad in 1964. They have two children, including Dan Eldad.

== Stage ==
- The Diary of Anne Frank as Anne Frank (1956)
- Billy Elliot the Musical as Billy Elliot's grandmother (2016)

== Filmography ==
- The Faithful City (1952) as Anna
- The Glass Cage (1965) as Sonia
- Sinaia (1966) as Bedouin Woman
- Moses the Lawgiver (1973) as Jochebed
- Jesus (1979) as Saint Elizabeth
- The New Media Bible: Book of Genesis (1979) as Sarah
- A Thousand Little Kisses (1981) as Routa
- Ha-Shiga'on Hagadol (1986) as Nurse Hava
- Late Marriage (2001) as Luba
- The Galilee Eskimos (2006) as Fanny
- You Don't Mess with the Zohan (2008) as Mrs. Dvir, Zohan's mother
- A Tale of Love and Darkness (2015) as Grandma Klausner
- Holy Lands (2017) as Mrs. Lapierre
- Coco (Hebrew Version) (2017) as Mamá Coco (voice)
- Unorthodox (2020, TV Mini Series) as Bubbe, Esty's grandmother
