= 792nd Intelligence Support Squadron =

792d Intelligence Support Squadron
- Active: 2010-present
- Country: United States
- Branch: United States Air Force
- Type: Squadron
- Role: Intelligence
- Part of: Sixteenth Air Force
- Garrison/HQ: Hickam Air Force Base
- Decorations: Air Force Meritorious Unit Award; Air Force Outstanding Unit Award (2x)

Insignia
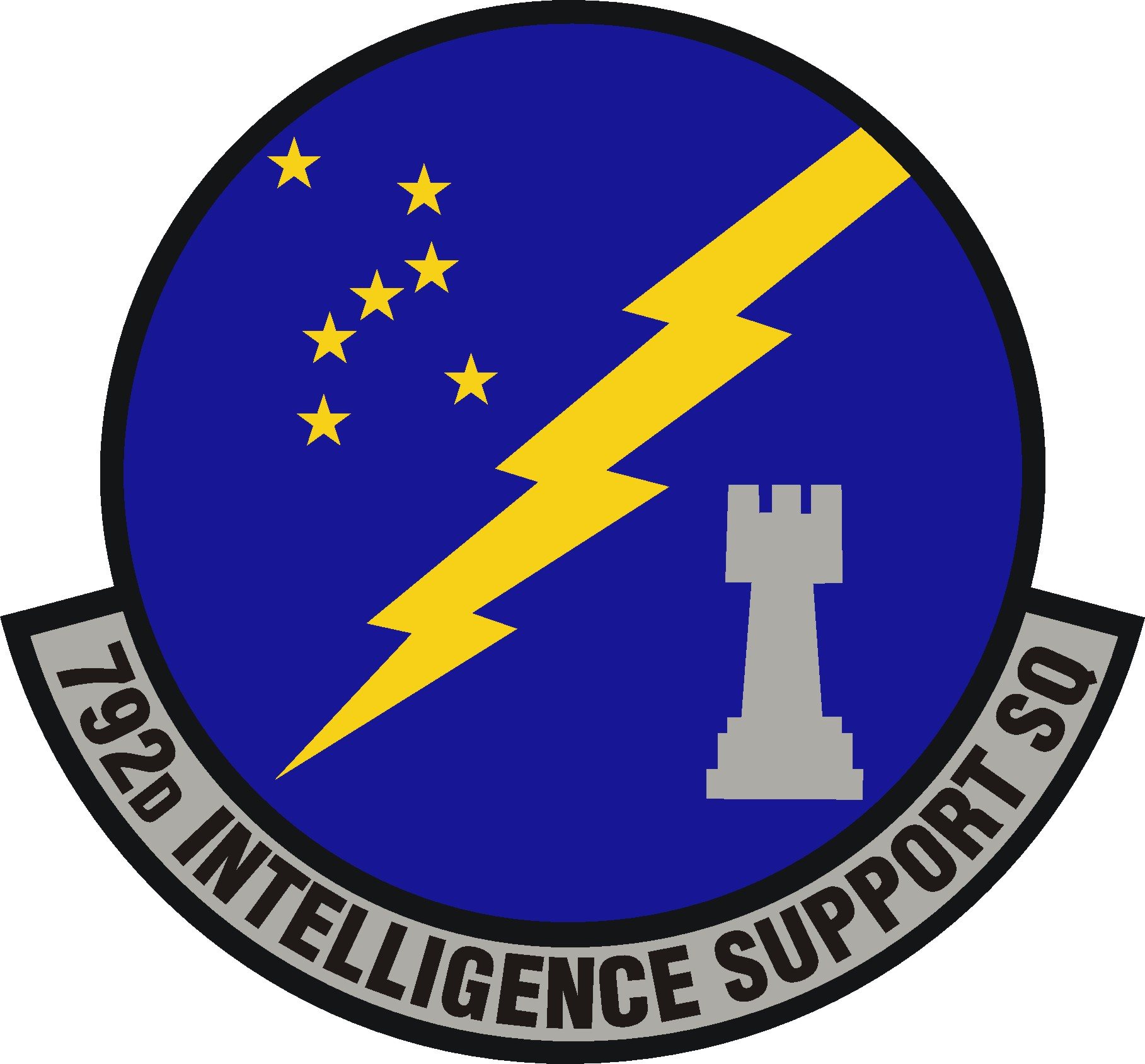
- 792d Intelligence Support Squadron emblem (approved 1 Jun 2012): Emblem of the 792 ISS

The United States Air Force's 792d Intelligence Support Squadron is an intelligence support unit located at Hickam Air Force Base, Hawaii. It is assigned to the 692d Intelligence, Surveillance and Reconnaissance Group also at Hickam, which is under the 480th Intelligence, Surveillance and Reconnaissance Wing based in Langley Air Force Base, Virginia.

== Mission ==
The mission of the 792d Intelligence Support Squadron is to provide communication, computer maintenance and logistical support for the United States Air Force's Distributed Common Ground System, or DCGS, in Pacific Theater missions.

== Lineage ==
- Created as Detachment 1, 692d ISR Group

Inactivated on June 4, 2010

- Redesignated 792d Intelligence Support Squadron on June 4, 2010

== Emblem ==
Ultramarine blue and Air Force yellow are the Air Force colors. Blue alludes to the sky, the primary theater of Air Force operations. Yellow refers to the sun and the excellence required of Air Force personnel. The Orion Constellation symbolizes the warrior-hunter of the unit's profession of arms, while the stars symbolize "eyes-in-the-sky," the reconnaissance and surveillance platforms the unit uses to accomplish the mission. The lightning bolt represents the Squadron's communications and logistics functions, which are critical to the success of the DGS-5 mission. The lightning bolt serves as a common element in both the communication and logistics fields and ties these two functions together. The rook symbolizes the intelligence mission and demonstrates how the unit stands with the intelligence squadrons in the group to accomplish their unique mission

== Decorations ==
- Air Force Outstanding Unit Award
- Air Force Meritorious Unit Award
