= 8th Intelligence Squadron =

US Air Force unit

- Active: 1943–1949; 2009-present
- Country: United States
- Branch: United States Air Force
- Role: Intelligence
- Part of: Air Force Intelligence, Surveillance and Reconnaissance Agency
- Garrison/HQ: Hickam Air Force Base
- Decorations: Air Force Outstanding Unit Award; Philippine Republic Presidential Unit Citation

Insignia
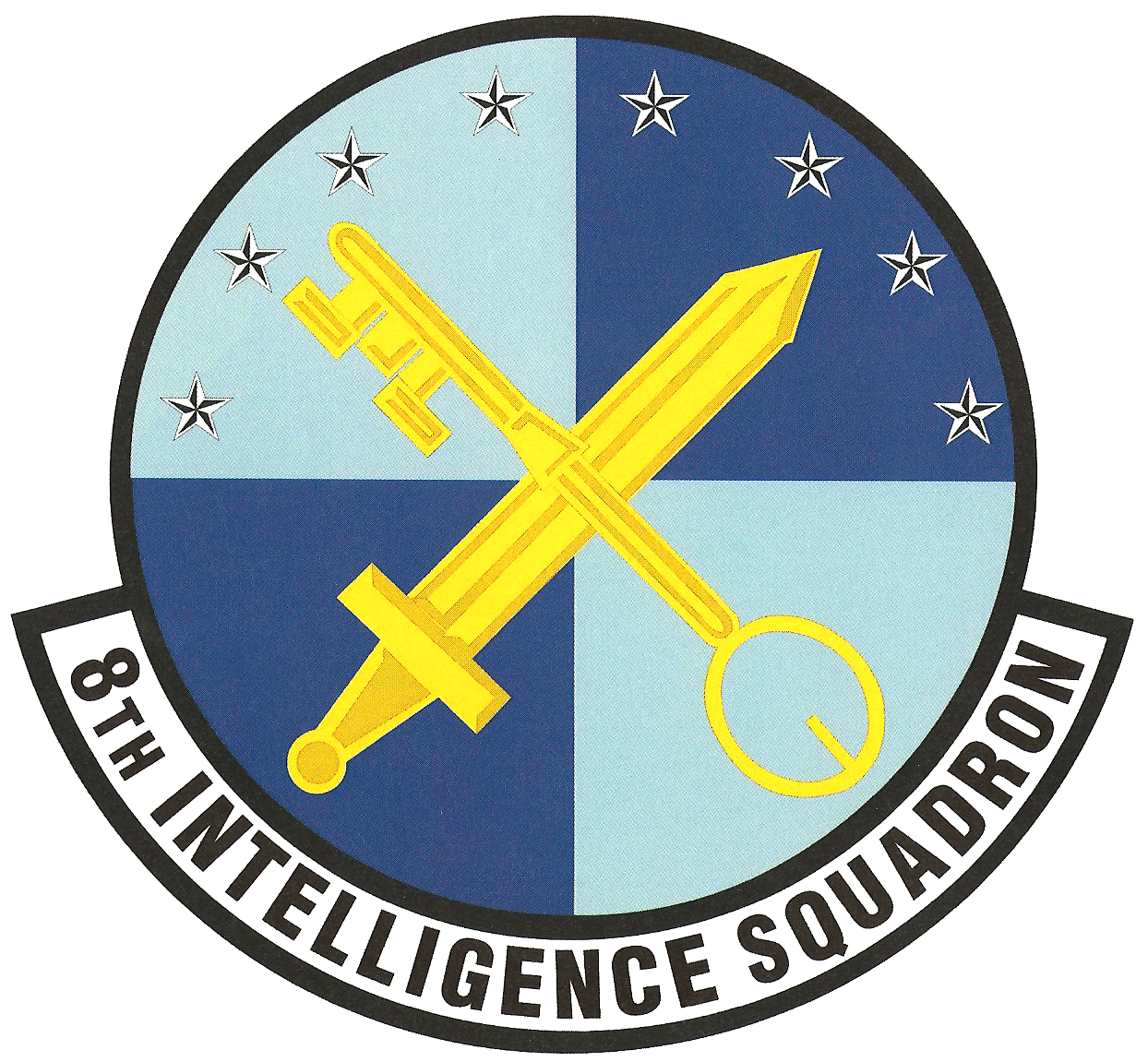
- 8th Intelligence Squadron emblem (approved 10 August 2009)

The United States Air Force's 8th Intelligence Squadron is an intelligence unit located at Hickam AFB, Hawaii.

== Lineage ==
- Constituted as the 8th Photo Lab Section on 21 Oct 1943

Activated on 1 Nov 1943
Redesignated 8th Photographic Technical Unit on 4 Nov 1944
Inactivated on 1 Apr 1949

- Redesignated 8th Reconnaissance Technical Squadron on 16 October 1984 (remained inactive) (Note: The squadron is not related to the 8th Reconnaissance Technical Squadron that was assigned to Eighth Air Force from 1952 to 1960. That unit is active as the 3d Intelligence Squadron.)
- Redesignated 8th Intelligence Squadron on 9 Dec 2008

Activated on 1 January 2009

=== Assignments ===
- III Reconnaissance Command, 1 November 1943
- Fifth Air Force, 30 April 1944
- 91st Photographic Wing (later 91st Reconnaissance Wing), 8 May 1944 (Note: Robertson identifies the wing as the "91st Photographic Reconnaissance Wing," but see Maurer, Combat Units, pp. 410-411)
- V Bomber Command, 6 March 1946
- Fifth Air Force, 14 November 1948
- 314th Air Division, 20 August 1948 – 1 April 1949
- 692d Intelligence, Surveillance and Reconnaissance Group, 1 Jan 2009 – present

=== Stations ===
- Will Rogers Field, Oklahoma, 1 November 1943
- Woodward Army Air Field, Oklahoma, 27 December 1943
- Will Rogers Field, Oklahoma, 6 Feb 1944
- Camp Stoneman, California, 26 March – 9 April 1944
- Australia, 30 April 1944
- Nadzab, New Guinea, 5 May 1944
- Hollandia, New Guinea, 25 June 1944
- Biak Island New Guinea, 14 August 1944
- Leyte, Philippines, 5 November 1944
- Mindoro, Philippines, 29 January 1945
- Clark Field, Luzon, Philippines, 20 March 1945
- Toguchi, Okinawa, 27 July 1945
- Tachikawa, Japan, 27 September 1945
- Irumagawa Army Air Base, Japan, 19 January 1946 – 1 April 1949
- Hickam Air Force Base, Hawaii, 1 Jan 2009 – present

== Decorations ==
- Air Force Outstanding Unit Award
- Philippine Republic Presidential Unit Citation
