= The Faithful City =

1952 film

- Directed by: Józef Lejtes
- Screenplay by: Józef Lejtes; Ben Barzman
- Produced by: Józef Lejtes
- Starring: Jamie Smith; Ben Josef; John Slater; Rahel Marcus; Dina Doron; Didi Ramati
- Cinematography: Gerald Gibbs
- Edited by: John D. Guthridge
- Music by: Eduard Ben-Michael
- Production company: Moledet Films
- Distributed by: RKO Pictures
- Release date: April 7, 1952
- Running time: 79 minutes
- Country: United States
- Language: English

The Faithful City is a 1952 American drama film directed by Józef Lejtes and written by Józef Lejtes and Ben Barzman. The film stars Jamie Smith, Ben Josef, John Slater, Rahel Marcus, Dina Doron and Didi Ramati. The film was released on April 7, 1952, by RKO Pictures.

It was the first co-production between American and Israeli film companies, and the first American movie to be filmed in Israel.

== Cast ==
- Jamie Smith as Sam
- Ben Josef as Davidel
- John Slater as Ezra
- Rahel Marcus as Sarah
- Dina Doron as Anna
- Didi Ramati as Tamar
- Israel Hanin as Max
- Juda Levi as Joan
- Amnon Lifshitz
