= Jamie Smith (actor) =

American actor

- Jamie Smith in Killer's Kiss 1955
- Born: James Thomas Schmitt; August 28, 1921; Pittsburgh, Pennsylvania, U.S.
- Died: November 8, 2002 (aged 81); Camarillo, California, U.S.
- Other names: Jamie Schmitt
- Education: Central Catholic High School; Carnegie Tech; The Sorbonne
- Occupation: Actor
- Years active: 1946–1963
- Spouse: Micheline
- Children: 1

Jamie Smith (born James Thomas Schmitt; August 28, 1921 – November 8, 2002), was an American film, theater, and television actor, best known for starring in Stanley Kubrick's second feature film, Killer's Kiss, and in Józef Lejtes' The Faithful City, the first English-language film made in Israel.

== Early life and career ==
Smith was born in Pittsburgh, Pennsylvania, on August 28, 1921, the first of two children born to Sarah F. Smith and Thomas H. Schmitt, a church janitor. His family was of Pennsylvania Dutch (German) descent. He attended Central Catholic High School—where he starred in productions of Yankee Doodle Joe (as George M. Cohan) and Father Malachy's Miracle (based on the like-named novel)—and later Carnegie Tech, where his study was interrupted by a three-year hitch with the OSS during World War II. It was at Carnegie Tech and, after the war, the Pittsburgh Playhouse that Smith honed his craft, giving well received performances as Hildy Johnson in The Front Page and as Yank in John Patrick's The Hasty Heart. Regarding the latter, Sun Telegraph critic Karl Krug called it "one of the most remarkable examples of timing which I have ever been witness in the theater [sic]," adding that it clearly surpassed the portrayal of that character seen the previous fall in the play's Pittsburgh premiere at the Nixon Theater.

Following his graduation from Carnegie Tech, Smith travelled to France in 1947 with the intention of continuing his studies at the Sorbonne. However, the amount of work that was coming his way almost from the outset led him to drop out after six months. It was reportedly while working with Orson Welles' theater company in Paris that Smith was first spotted by director Józef Lejtes.

In March 1952, (having already made uncredited appearances in foreign-made releases such as Monte Carlo Baby and The Green Glove), Smith made his screen debut in the Schlitz Playhouse of Stars episode, "The Human Touch,' starring Vincent Price and Diana Lynn. The trade publication Variety praised Smith's performance while also alerting readers to his upcoming big screen debut.

[There was] deft support by veteran Frank McHugh and teevee newcomer Jamie Smith. [...] As [Lynn's] longhair sweetie, Jamie Smith showed a relaxed, natural style and sincerity that launched him creditably in his video preem (he's star of upcoming Israeli pic, 'The Faithful City,' an RKO release).

Regarding his Faithful City performance as the sympathetic but discipline-minded American camp counsellor who gradually comes around to the more single-mindedly compassionate approach favored by his British counterpart (John Slater), Hollywood Reporter's review noted RKO's "introduc[tion of] an interesting personality in Jamie Smith, a ruggedly handsome chap with definite talent [who] com[es] over as a forceful, likable lead."

In 1955, Smith co-starred with Irene Kane and Frank Silvera in Stanley Kubrick's low-budget, independently produced film noir, Killer's Kiss.

Reviewing Smith's 1957 guest spot—alongside series star Nancy Wilder—on NBC's 15-minute soap, Modern Romances, Billboard's Bob Bernstein wrote that Smith "joined her in making the dialog real and moving in a triumph of talent over limited time."

On March 13, 1960, in conjunction with the Jewish holiday Purim, The Faithful City received its American television premiere. Later that year, it was reported that Smith had founded his own theater company in New York; on October 3, they performed a staged reading of Albert Camus's The Stranger at Manhattan's Donnell Library Center. The following year, Smith appeared in at least two episodes of the New York-set police procedural series Naked City.

By the mid-1960s (following a brief, uncredited appearance as a deputy in the 1963 Route 66 episode, "Two Strangers and an Old Enemy"), Smith's acting career appears to have run its course. His last documented public performance took place in April 1967 at Fairleigh Dickinson University, with "professional actor Jamie Smith" leading an otherwise non-pro ensemble of FDU students and locally residing children in a production of Archibald MacLeish's J.B..

== Personal life ==
In 1950 or thereabouts, during his post-Carnegie Tech sojourn in France, Smith met and married Micheline. They had one child, a son, Jan.

On November 8, 2002, having spent at least the final portion of his post-acting, pre-retirement years as a high school teacher, Smith died at age 81, in Camarillo, California.

== Filmography ==
- Monte Carlo Baby (1951) – Radio Announcer at Railroad Station (uncredited)
- The Green Glove (1952) – Bartender (uncredited)
- Schlitz Playhouse
  - "The Human Touch" (1952)
  - "Doctors Should Never Marry" (1952)
- The Faithful City (1952) – Sam
- Kraft Theatre
  - "Death of Kid Slawson" (1952) – Kid Slawson
  - "My Aunt Daisy" (1955)
  - "The Singin' Idol" (1957)
- Police Story
  - "The San Francisco Case" (1952)
- Armstrong Circle Theatre
  - "Remembrance Island" (1952)
- Short Short Dramas
  - "The Cloud" (1952)
- Suspense
  - "The Moving Target" (1952) – Peter Darvas
- The Web
  - "Rehearsal for Death" (1952)
  - "Stranger in the Dark" (1952)
  - "Somewhere in Korea" (1953)
  - "The House" (1954) – Joe
- Lux Video Theatre
  - "The Magnolia Touch" (1952) – Mark
  - "Rebuke Me Not" (1956) – Hunter
- The Big Story
  - "Al Schottelkotte of the Cincinnati Enquirer" (1952) – Al Schottelkotte
  - "George Murphy of the San Francisco News" (1956) – George Murphy Jr.
- The United States Steel Hour
  - "Haven's End" (1954) – John Scarlet Jr.
  - "Freighter" (1955) – Connors
  - "The Bride Cried" (1955) – Arnold Bannister
- Princeton '55
  - "Enjoyment of Poetry" (1955) - The Son from Robert Frost's The Witch of Coös
- General Electric Theater
  - "The Bitter Choice" (1955)
- Killer's Kiss (1955) – Davey Gordon
- Studio One
  - "The Judge and His Hangman" (1955) Tschantz
- Modern Romances
  - "The Child"
- True Story (TV series)
  - "The Set-Up" (1957)
  - Episode airing May 31, 1958
  - Episode airing July 5, 1958
- The Investigator
  - Episode airing June 24, 1958
- Camera Three
  - "The Pieces" (1960)
- Naked City
  - "A Hole in the City" (1961) – Jay Plessus
  - "A Kettle of Precious Fish" (1961) – Babe Maning
  - "The Hot Minerva" (1961) – Marty
- Route 66
  - "Two Strangers and an Old Enemy" (1963) – Deputy
