= A Thousand Little Kisses =

1981 film

- Film poster
- Directed by: Mira Recanati
- Written by: Mira Recanati
- Starring: Dina Doron
- Cinematography: David Gurfinkel
- Release date: 1981
- Running time: 110 minutes
- Country: Israel
- Language: Hebrew

A Thousand Little Kisses (Hebrew: אלף נשיקות קטנות, translit. Elef Nishikot K'tanot) is a 1981 Israeli drama film written and directed by Mira Recanati.

The screenplay focuses on a mother and daughter, each dealing in her own way with the secret of the father's/b husband's infidelity after his death.

The film was submitted as the Israeli entry for the Best Foreign Language Film at the 54th Academy Awards, but was not accepted as a nominee. It was also screened in the Un Certain Regard section of the 1981 Cannes Film Festival.

== Plot ==
Alma Levitan (Rivka Neumann) is a fashion designer living in Jaffa, working at a large women's clothing store in Dizengoff Center alongside her friend Nili (Nirit Yaron). After her father, David, passes away, she goes to the hospital with Nili to collect his belongings and visit her mother, Ruta (Dina Doron), who is hospitalized after a suspected heart attack. She shows Ruta her father’s watch and informs her of his passing.

David, an amateur painter, had some of his works displayed at a gallery, where Alma finds paintings dedicated to a woman named Mara. After a brief search, she discovers that Mara (Rina Oticel) owns a beauty salon and has a son named Mica (Gidi Rol). Alma soon learns that her father had a long-term affair with Mara, something neither she nor Ruta knew.

Alma reveals this to her mother, who demands that she cease contact with Mara and Mica. Ruta believes Mica to be David’s son, but the truth is that Mara came to Israel alone when her son was three, and David had supported her throughout the years.

== Cast ==
- Dina Doron as Routa
- Kohava Harari
- Adi Kaplan
- Rivka Neuman as Alma
- Rina Otchital as Mara
- Daphne Recanati as Daphna
- Gad Roll as Mika
- Dan Tavori as Uri
- Nirit Yaron as Nili (as Nirit Gronich)
- Nissim Zohar as Eli o

== See also ==
- List of submissions to the 54th Academy Awards for Best Foreign Language Film
- List of Israeli submissions for the Academy Award for Best Foreign Language Film
