= Shai Nitzan =

Former State Attorney of Israel

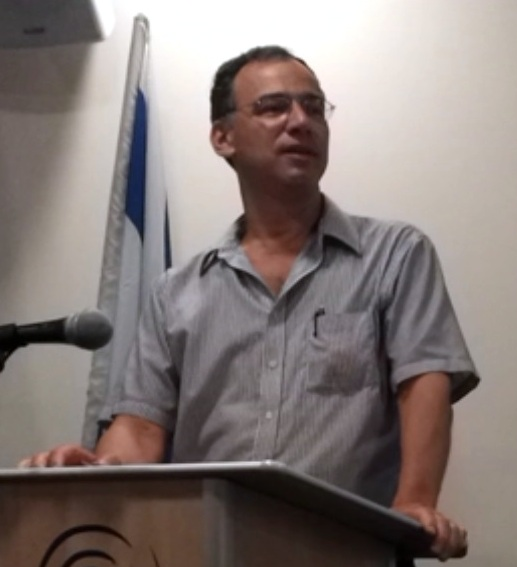

Shai Nitzan (Hebrew: שי ניצן) is the former State Attorney of Israel, from 2013 to December 2019.

Nitzan headed the commission assigned to investigate the October 2000 events, finding no misconduct on the part of the Israel Police.

The position was vacant from December 2019 to 5 February 2020, when Dan Eldad was appointed to the position. Avichai Mandelblit had initially objected to Eldad's appointment, but later dropped his opposition. In November 2021 Nitzan was appointed rector of the National Library of Israel.
