= 692nd Intelligence, Surveillance and Reconnaissance Group =

692nd Intelligence, Surveillance and Reconnaissance Group
- Active: 1979–present
- Country: United States
- Branch: United States Air Force
- Type: Intelligence
- Role: Combat Support
- Part of: Air Combat Command: Sixteenth Air Force; 480th ISR Wing
- Garrison/HQ: Hickam AFB, Hawaii
- Decorations: AFOUA AFOEA

Commanders
- Current commander: Colonel Dennis Borrman
- Deputy Commander: Lt Col Daniel Newcomer
- Superintendent: CMSgt Aaron Shirley

Insignia
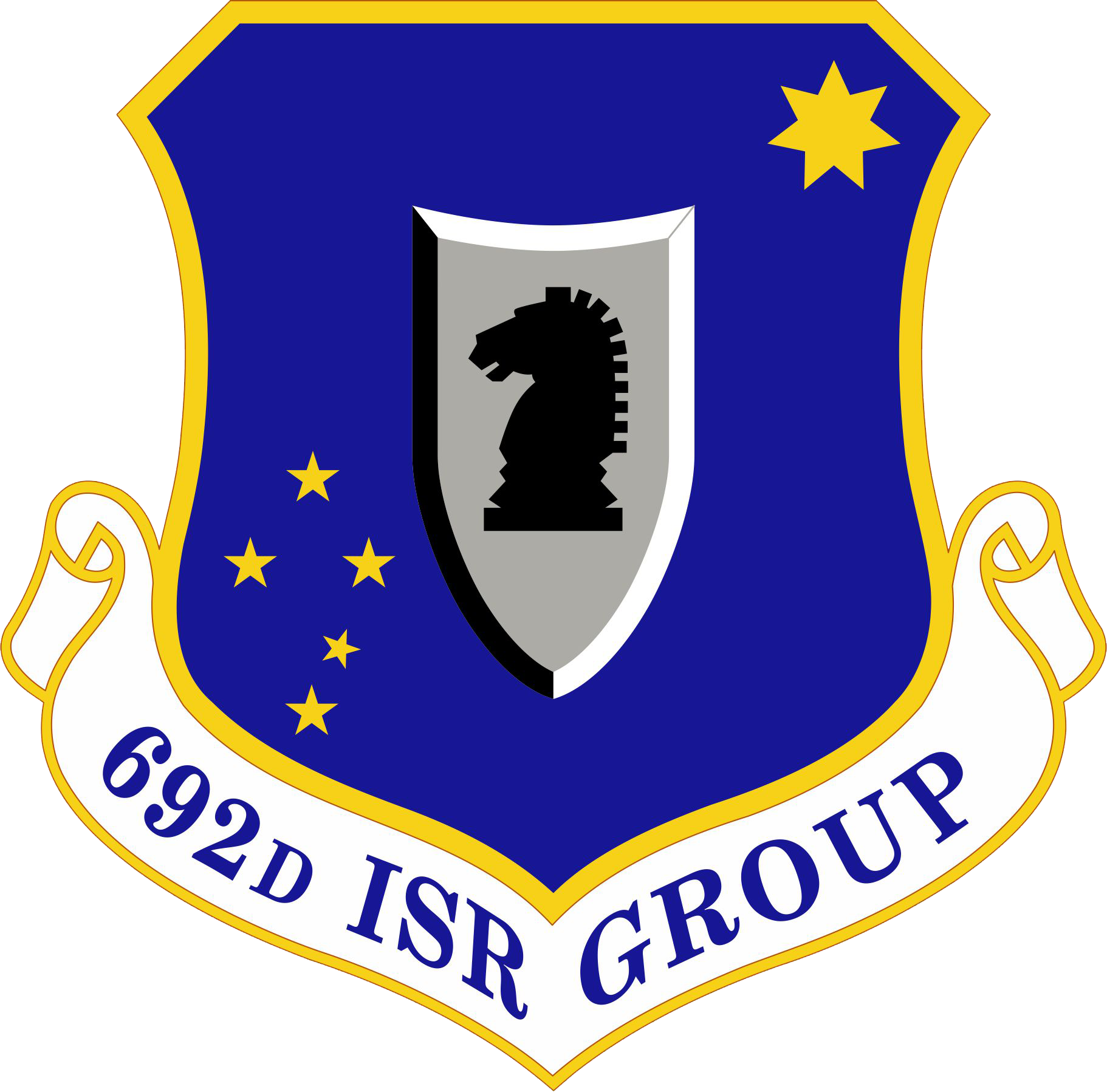
- 692nd Intelligence, Surveillance and Reconnaissance Group emblem (approved 22 August 2018)

The United States Air Force's 692nd Intelligence, Surveillance and Reconnaissance Group is an intelligence unit located at Hickam AFB, Hawaii, performing operations as part of the Kunia Regional Security Operations Center (KRSOC).

== Mission ==
The mission of the 692nd Intelligence, Surveillance & Reconnaissance Group is to execute national and tactical ISR operations and missions providing predictive, actionable intelligence for warfighting forces, combatant commanders and national authorities.

== Previous designations ==
- 692nd Intelligence, Surveillance and Reconnaissance Group (1 Jan 2009 – present)
- 692nd Intelligence Group (1 May 2005 – ????)
- 692nd Information Operations Group (1 Aug 2000 – 1 May 2005)
- 692nd Intelligence Group (1 Oct 1993 – 1 Aug 2000)
- 692nd Intelligence Wing (1 Oct 1991 – 1 Oct 1993)
- Pacific Electronic Security Division (1 Oct 1986 – 1 Oct 1991)
- Electronic Security Division, Pacific (24 Oct 1979 – 1 Oct 1986)

== Assignments ==
=== Major Command/Field Operating Agency/Numbered Air Force ===
- Air Combat Command (ACC) (present)
- 16 AF (present)
- Air Force Intelligence, Surveillance and Reconnaissance Agency (8 Jun 2007 – 2013)
- Air Intelligence Agency (1 Oct 1993 – 8 Jun 2007)
- Air Force Intelligence Command (1 Oct 1991 – 1 Oct 1993)
- Electronic Security Command (1 Nov 1979 – 1 Oct 1991)

=== Wings/Groups ===
- 480th ISR Wing (28 Jun 2006 – present)
- 67th Intelligence Wing (1 Oct 1993 – 28 Jun 2006)

== Squadrons assigned ==
- 8th Intelligence Squadron – Hickam AFB, Hawaii
- 324th Intelligence Squadron – Hickam AFB, Hawaii
- 392nd Intelligence Squadron – Hickam AFB, Hawaii
- 792nd Intelligence Support Squadron – Hickam AFB, Hawaii

== Bases stationed ==
- Hickam AFB, Hawaii (1 Nov 1979 – present)

== Decorations ==
- Air Force Outstanding Unit Award
  - 1 Jun 2002 – 31 May 2003 (with Combat "Valor" device)
  - 1 Jun 2001 – 31 May 2002
  - 1 Oct 1999-30 Sep 2000
  - 1 Oct 1997 – 30 Sep 1998
  - 1 Oct 1994-30 Sep 1995
  - 1 Oct 1993 – 30 Sep 1994
  - 1 Jul 1991-30 Jun 1993
- Air Force Organizational Excellence Award
  - 1 Jan 1985 – 31 Dec 1986
