= 315th =

315th may refer to:

- 315th (Kirkcudbright) Field Battery, Royal Artillery (RA) unit of Britain's part-time Territorial Army (TA) during World War II
- 315th (North Midland) Medium Regiment, Royal Artillery, part-time unit of Britain's Royal Artillery (RA), raised before the outbreak of World War II
- 315th Air Division, inactive United States Air Force formation
- 315th Airlift Wing, wing of the United States Air Force Reserve
- 315th Bombardment Squadron, United States Space Force's space domain awareness delta, headquartered at Peterson Space Force Base, Colorado
- 315th Cavalry Regiment (United States), cavalry unit of the United States Army during World War I and the interwar period
- 315th Cyberspace Operations Squadron, cyberspace warfare unit located at Fort George G. Meade, Maryland
- 315th Engineer Battalion, multi-role engineer battalion of the United States Army based in Camp Pendleton, California
- 315th Fighter Squadron, active squadron of the United States Air Force
- 315th Operations Group, United States Air Force Reserve unit assigned to the 315th Airlift Wing
- 315th Polish "Deblinski" Fighter Squadron, one of several Polish squadrons in the Royal Air Force (RAF) during the Second World War
- 315th Rifle Division (Soviet Union), standard Red Army rifle division formed in 1942 in the Siberian Military District
- 315th Troop Carrier Squadron, inactive United States Air Force unit
- 315th Weapons Squadron, United States Air Force unit, assigned to the USAF Weapons School at Nellis Air Force Base, Nevada

== See also ==
- 315 (number)
- 315, the year 315 (CCCXV) of the Julian calendar
- 315 BC
