= Dan Eldad =

Israeli lawyer

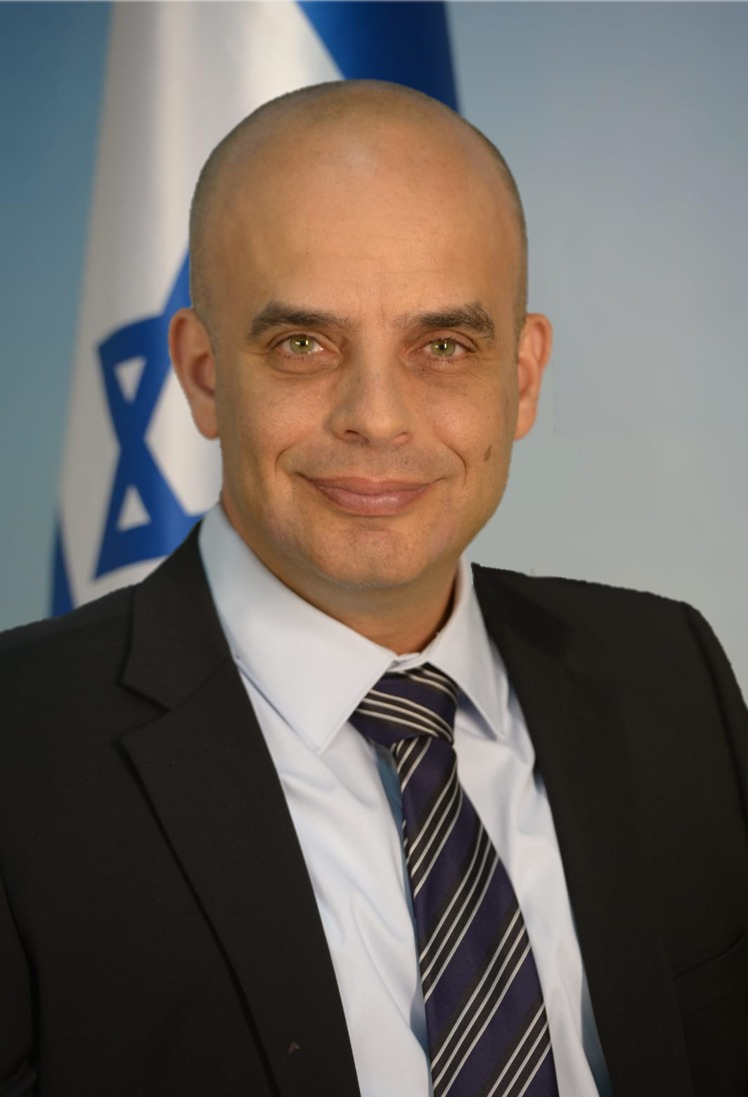
Dan Eldad

Dan Eldad is an Israeli lawyer who served as acting State Attorney of Israel from 5 February to 1 May 2020.

== Biography ==
Dan Eldad is the son of the Israeli actress Dina Doron and theater director Ilan Eldad.

== Legal career ==
Eldad was appointed to head the economic investigations department in the State Attorney's office in 2013; in this post he prosecuted high-profile corruption cases.

When the term of the previous State Attorney, Shai Nitzan, expired in December 2019, the position remained vacant until 5 February 2020. Attorney General Avichai Mandelblit had initially objected to Justice Minister Amir Ohana's first choice and also to Eldad (Ohana's second choice), but eventually changed his mind.

Eldad's appointment was for a temporary three-month term, expiring on 1 May 2020. In April, Mandelblit expressed his opposition to the extending Eldad's term. In a letter to Civil Service Commissioner Daniel Hershkowitz he claimed that Eldad had exhibited "moral, professional and administrative failings" during his time in office. Mandelblit reportedly believed that Eldad and Ohana were trying to oust him. On 30 April, the High Court ruled that Eldad's term would not be extended.
