= 315th Cyberspace Operations Squadron =

315th Cyberspace Operations Squadron
- Active: 1951-1955; 1970-1991; 1993-2001; 2005-present
- Country: United States
- Branch: United States Air Force
- Role: Offensive Cyberspace Operations
- Size: 130 personnel
- Part of: Air Combat Command
- Garrison/HQ: Fort George G. Meade, Maryland
- Nickname: Cobras (1970-1991)
- Mottos: Ready to Respond (1970-1991); Cavete Draconem Latin Beware of the Dragon (2005-present)
- Mascot: Dragon
- Engagements: Korean War
- Decorations: Air Force Outstanding Unit Award with Combat "V" Device; Air Force Outstanding Unit Award; Republic of Korea Presidential Unit Citation; Philippine Presidential Unit Citation; Vietnamese Gallantry Cross with Palm

Insignia
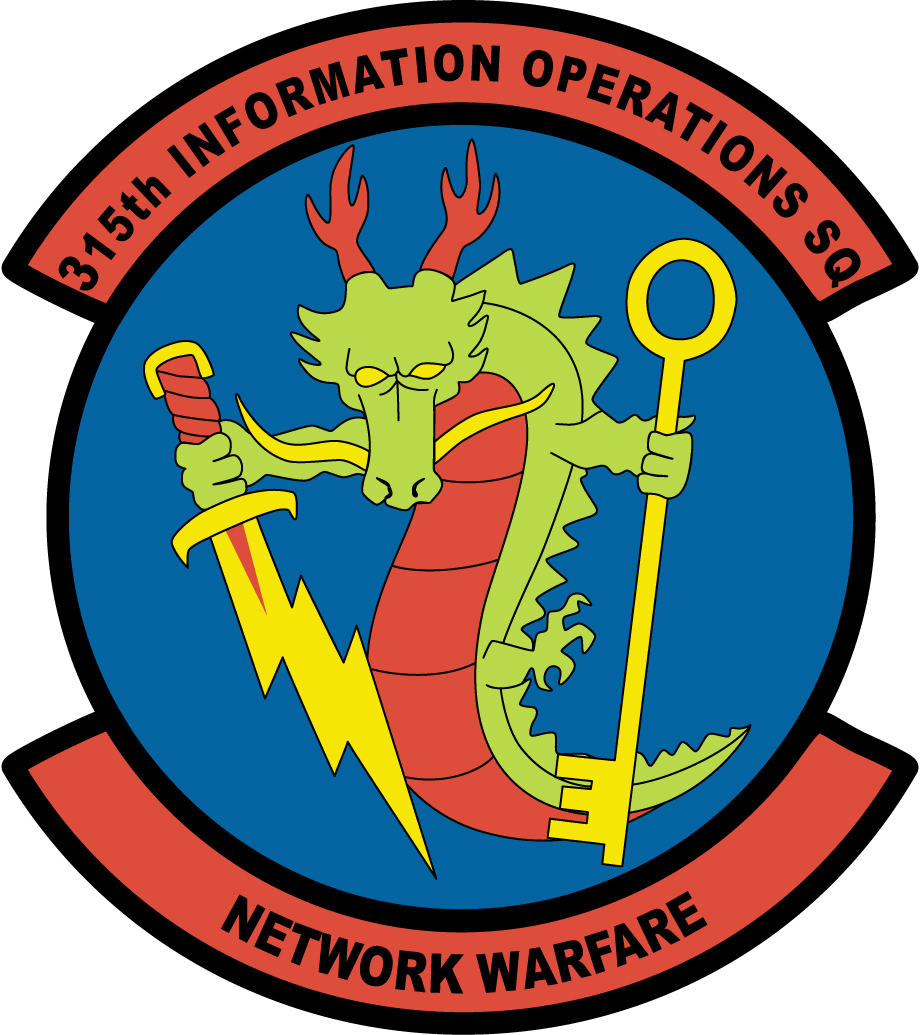
- 315th Cyberspace Operations Squadron emblem (approved 9 May 1996)

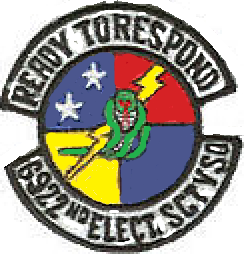
- Patch with 6922d Electronic Security Squadron emblem

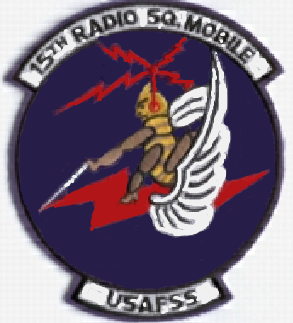
- Patch with 15th Radio Squadron, Mobile emblem

The United States Air Force's 315th Cyberspace Operations Squadron is a cyberspace warfare unit located at Fort George G. Meade, Maryland.

The first predecessor of the unit was the 15th Radio Squadron, which was activated in 1951 and performed signals intelligence missions from locations in Japan and Korea during the Korean War. It was inactivated in May 1955 and its mission and assets were transferred to the 6922d Radio Group, Mobile.

The 315th's second predecessor was the 6922d Security Group, which was activated at Clark Air Base in the Philippines in April 1970. When the American presence in Southeast Asia was reduced, the group was reduced in size and became the 6922d Security Squadron. This unit was inactivated with the closure of Clark due to the eruption of Mount Pinatubo in 1991. These two units were consolidated as the 315th Intelligence Squadron in 1993.

== Mission ==
The squadron's mission is to hack the hackers.

== History ==
=== Korean Service ===
The 15th Radio Squadron, Mobile was organized at Brooks Air Force Base, Texas for service in the Korean War. In July, the squadron departed Texas for Ashiya Air Base, Japan, where it was to operate until inactivated in May 1955. Upon the squadron's arrival in Japan, the former Detachment 3 of the 1st Radio Squadron, Mobile, located at Ewha Womans University in Seoul, Korea was transferred to the 15th as Detachment 1, 15th Radio Squadron, Mobile. The squadron mission was to provide tactical intelligence data to the air operations center of Fifth Air Force in Korea, located a short distance from Detachment 3.

By 1952, the need for intelligence collection closer to the battle lines than Seoul became evident. The People's Liberation Army Air Force was upgrading their tactical communications from High Frequency to Very High Frequency systems, which could not be effectively detected at long ranges. Fifth Air Force began to operate Douglas C-47 Skytrain aircraft from Yokota Air Base, Japan. Members of the 15th flew in the back of these airplanes, which patrolled just behind the front lines and off the coast of North Korea, recording data on wire recorders. Recordings were dropped to the unit's Detachment 2, which had been established on Cho Do Island, off the coast of North Korea. This was then transferred to ground controlled intercept controllers of the 608th Aircraft Control and Warning Squadron on the island to provide near real time threat information to American fighter aircraft.

In May 1955, the squadron was inactivated and its mission, personnel and equipment were transferred to the 6922d Radio Group, Mobile at Ashiya. It was kept on the Air Force's books as an inactive unit until June 1983, when it was disbanded.

=== Clark Air Base ===
The 6922d Security Group was activated in April 1970 at Clark Air Base in the Philippines. Initially, the group conducted operations through subordinate detachments ranging from Thailand through Japan. With the withdrawal of the United States from Vietnam, operations were substantially reduced, and by 1974 were limited to direction finding, and the group was reduced to the 6922d Security Squadron. Operations continued through June 1991, when Mount Pinatubo erupted, covering Clark with volcanic ash. It became apparent that resumption of operations at Clark was neither financially or politically viable, and the squadron began to devote itself to the salvage and removal of equipment, except for a small contingent of linguists. The squadron was inactivated as remaining Air Force assets at Clark were turned over to the Philippine government.

=== Consolidated unit ===
The 15th and 6922d squadrons were consolidated in 1993 as the 315th Intelligence Squadron at Yokota Air Base, Japan. The squadron was inactivated in 2001, but was again activated as the 315th Information Operations Squadron at Fort George G. Meade, Maryland, where it has been active under various designations until today.

== Lineage ==
15th Radio Squadron

Constituted as the 15th Radio Squadron, Mobile on 2 February 1951

Activated on 9 February 1951
Inactivated on 8 May 1955

- Disbanded on 15 June 1983
- Reconstituted, and consolidated with the 6922d Electronic Security Squadron on 1 October 1993

315th Cyberspace Operations Squadron

- Established as the 6922d Security Group on 1 April 1970

Redesignated 6922d Security Squadron on 1 July 1974
Redesignated 6922d Electronic Security Squadron on 1 August 1979
Inactivated on 15 December 1991

- Consolidated with the 15th Radio Squadron, redesignated 315th Intelligence Squadron and activated on 1 October 1993

Inactivated on 1 July 2001

- Redesignated 315th Information Operations Squadron on 10 May 2005

Activated on 16 May 2005
Redesignated 315th Network Warfare Squadron on 26 July 2007
Redesignated 315th Cyberspace Operations Squadron on 15 May 2015

=== Assignments ===
- United States Air Force Security Service, 9 February 1951
- 6920th Security Group (later, 6920th Security Wing), 16 February 1952 – 8 May 1955
- Pacific Security Region, 1 April 1970
- United States Air Force Security Service (later Electronic Security Command), 31 December 1972
- Electronic Security, Pacific (later Pacific Electronic Security Division, 692d Intelligence Wing), 30 September 1980 – 15 December 1991
- 692d Intelligence Group (later 692d Information Operations Group), 1 October 1993 – 1 July 2001
- 318th Information Operations Group, 16 May 2005
- 67th Information Operations Group (later 67th Network Warfare Group, 67th Cyberspace Operations Group), 12 June 2006 – 18 September 2020
- 867th Cyberspace Operations Group, 18 September 2020 – present

=== Stations ===
- Brooks Air Force Base, Texas, 9 February 1951 – 3 July 1951
- Ashiya Air Base, Japan, 26 July 1951 – 8 May 1955
- Clark Air Base, Luzon, Philippines, 1 April 1970 – 15 December 1991
- Yokota Air Base, Japan, 1 October 1993 – 1 July 2001
- Fort George G. Meade, Maryland, 16 May 2005 – present

=== Awards and campaigns ===
Award streamer	Award	Dates	Notes
	Air Force Outstanding Unit Award with Combat "V" Device	1 October 2010-30 September 2012	315th Network Warfare Squadron
	Air Force Outstanding Unit Award	1 December 1952 – 27 July 1953	15th Radio Squadron, Mobile
	Air Force Outstanding Unit Award	1 April 1970–31 October 1970	6922d Security Group
	Air Force Outstanding Unit Award	1 January 1976–30 June 1977	6922d Security Squadron
	Air Force Outstanding Unit Award	1 July 1978–30 June 1980	6922d Security Squadron (later 6922d Electronic Security Squadron)
	Air Force Outstanding Unit Award	1 July 1985–30 June 1987	6922d Electronic Security Squadron
	Air Force Outstanding Unit Award	1 July 1987–30 June 1989	6922d Electronic Security Squadron
	Air Force Outstanding Unit Award	1 July 1991–4 December 1991	6922d Electronic Security Squadron
	Air Force Outstanding Unit Award	1 October 1993–30 September 1994	315th Intelligence Squadron
	Air Force Outstanding Unit Award	1 October 1994–30 September 1995	315th Intelligence Squadron
	Air Force Outstanding Unit Award	1 October 1997–30 September 1998	315th Intelligence Squadron
	Air Force Outstanding Unit Award	1 October 1999–30 September 2000	315th Intelligence Squadron
	Air Force Outstanding Unit Award	12 June 2006-31 May 2007	315th Information Operations Squadron
	Air Force Outstanding Unit Award	1 October 2012-30 September 2013	315th Network Warfare Squadron
	Korean Presidential Unit Citation	1 July 1951–27 July 1953	15th Radio Squadron, Mobile
	Philippine Republic Presidential Unit Citation	21 July 1972–15 August 1972	6922d Security Group
	Vietnamese Gallantry Cross with Palm	1 April 1970–28 January 1973	6922d Security Group

Campaign Streamer	Campaign	Dates	Notes
	Korean Service	26 July 1951 – 27 July 1953	15th Radio Squadron, Mobile

== See also ==
- List of cyber warfare forces
