= State Attorney (Israel) =

Governing body of law

The State Attorney's office (Hebrew: פרקליטות המדינה, Praklitut Hamedinah) represents the State of Israel and the government authorities before the various courts and tribunals, at all levels. The State Attorney's Office is part of the executive branch of the State of Israel, and operates organizationally as part of the Ministry of Justice. The work of the State Attorney's Office covers many areas of law, including criminal, civil, constitutional and administrative, economic-fiscal, labor law, and international law. In the field of criminal law enforcement, the State Attorney's Office operates independently.

As of the end of 2022 the State Attorney's Office consists of 14 headquarters units and 13 district attorney's offices. It has 2,114 employees, including 1,163 attorneys, 385 interns, 267 administrative employees, 149 students, 104 national service members, and 49 investigators from the Police Internal Affairs Department. The State Attorney's Office is headed by the State Attorney, who has four deputies – the Deputy for Criminal Affairs, the Deputy for Civil Affairs, the Deputy for Special Affairs, and the Deputy for Economic Enforcement.

For the most part it is the headquarters units that appear in the Supreme Court and the National Labor Court, and it is the district attorney's offices that appear in the Magistrate's and District Courts, the Family court, the Regional Labor Court and other tribunals (such as: Parole Committees appointed under the Parole from Imprisonment Law, 5761–2001) and in exceptional cases also in other instances such as the Local Court, the Rabbinical Court and the Enforcement Service.

== The prosecution as a prosecutor in criminal trials ==
The Penal Code and other criminal laws, such as the Dangerous Drugs Ordinance, establish criminal prohibitions, the violation of which will result in the filing of an indictment by the state against the violator. The Attorney General's Office, which represents the state, is the prosecutor in these trials. In the past, the prosecutor in criminal trials was the Attorney General. Since the mid-1970s, the prosecutor has been the State of Israel.

Cases of minor offences, tried in the Magistrate's Court, such as traffic offences, minor drug offences, and other offences for which the punishment is not severe, are handled by police prosecutors. These prosecutors, who are police officers, do not work in the prosecutor's office, and receive their certification from the Police commissioner.

There are types of offences, such as offences against planning and building laws or offences against business licensing laws, or against environmental laws, in which the state is represented by prosecutors on behalf of local authorities or certain government ministries. These prosecutors are usually private law firms, which receive accreditation from the Attorney General. These offences are also usually minor offences. Likewise, in certain offences, a private individual may also file an indictment, called a "criminal complaint."

The prosecution's handling of a case sometimes begins at the stage when the police collect the evidence against the suspect, with advice to investigators and guidance on the conduct of the case, to ensure that the evidence collection is proper or that certain steps in the investigation, such as using an agent or providing state witness status, are legal. The prosecution then handles matters of detention and its extension from time to time. Subsequently, an indictment is filed by the prosecution, and a trial is conducted, which the prosecution accompanies until the sentence is handed down. If an appeal is filed, the prosecution also handles this. Appeals filed with the Supreme Court are handled by the State Attorney's Office, which is headquartered in Jerusalem. Other appeals are handled by the district attorneys. If the defendant is convicted of a crime and sentenced to a prison term, the Attorney General's Office also represents the state before the Parole Committee, which decides on his release due to good behaviour, and in prisoner petitions before the courts where these petitions are filed, concerning the conditions of imprisonment and the prisoner's rights.

== The State Attorney's Office as the one who determines law enforcement policy ==
One of the components of the State Attorney's work is the guidance of the attorneys working in the State Attorney's Office. These guidelines, which come in writing from the State Attorney to the District Attorneys and from them to the other attorneys, are collected into guidelines, which outline the policy of the State Attorney's Office. Since the State Attorney's Office serves as an accompanying and advisory body to the Israeli Police in criminal matters, the State Attorney's guidelines also influence police policy.

An example of such a policy being established by the State Attorney is Directive 2.5 of the Attorney General's Office, which establishes the "policy of the prosecution, in the prosecution of a prosecution witness or complainant who recanted his testimony to the police in court," and is implemented by the police according to the practical instruction numbered 30.300.226.

Another example is Directive No. 14.13 – Recording an Interrogation by an Interrogated Person, issued in 2013 and revoked in 2016. The directive turned a person’s legal permission to record a conversation in which he is participating into a prohibition when it comes to recording his police interrogation, due to the definition of the act as allegedly contrary to Section 3 of the Wiretapping Law, according to which "listening to and recording a conversation, even if they are done with the consent of one of the parties to the conversation – are prohibited, and are treated as wiretapping, if they are done for the purpose of committing an offence or an act of damage, or for the purpose of revealing matters that are between him and her and are personal matters and not for the purpose of a legal proceeding between spouses.”

== The Structure of the State Attorney's Office ==
The State Attorney's Office is divided into two: 14 headquarters units, most of which are located in Jerusalem, and which generally represent the state before the Supreme Court and are engaged in determining legal policy, and 13 district attorney's offices, which represent the state in criminal and civil lawsuits in other courts throughout the country. The State Attorney's Office is headed by the State Attorney. He has four divisions: Criminal Matters, Civil Matters, Special Duties, and Economic Enforcement.

The State Attorney's Office has some 2,060 employees, including approximately 1,100 attorneys, about 260 administrative employees, about 45 investigators in the Police Investigations Department, some 375 interns, about 140 students, and about 105 servicemen and women.

=== The State Attorney's Office ===
There are four Deputy State Attorneys: the Deputy for Criminal Affairs, the Deputy for Civil Affairs, the Deputy for Special Duties, and the Deputy for Economic Enforcement. The term of office of the Deputy State Attorneys is limited to 8 years.

==== Deputy State Attorney for Criminal Matters ====
As of February 2025 this position has been held by Attorney Efrat Greenbaum, who replaced Shlomo (Mumi) Lemberger, who ended his position after about eight years.

The Deputy State Attorney for Criminal Affairs deals in the field of criminal law, issues with significant broad implications, and the professional guidance provided in the criminal field to all criminal units in the State Attorney's Office: the seven districts of the State Attorney's Office and the headquarters units in the Criminal Division: the Criminal Department of the State Attorney's Office, the Economic Department, the Police Investigations Department, the Cyber Department, the Real Estate Law Enforcement Department, the Appeals Unit, and the Stay of Proceedings Unit. In addition, the Deputy State Attorney for Criminal Affairs supervises additional prosecution bodies in the criminal field.

The duties of the Deputy State Attorney for Criminal Matters:

- Setting goals and indicators in the criminal field and issuing appropriate guidelines for all prosecution, enforcement and investigation authorities on criminal matters.
- Convening professional forums in the following areas: traffic; negligent homicide offences (other than traffic accidents); computer offences and digital evidence; legislation; human trafficking; juvenile offences; government corruption; psychiatry; investigation material and confidentiality; victims of offences; building discretion in punishment; investigation and testimony of persons with disabilities; sexual offences; defence of justice; signet and locator; online gambling; compensation for the accused; conditional settlement. The forums are shared by the units of the Attorney General's Office, the Israel Police, the Prison Service, welfare authorities, the General Security Service, the Criminal Law and Advisory Department at the Ministry of Justice, and more.
- Convening a forum of managers of units dealing in the criminal field in the Attorney General's Office, to formulate a uniform enforcement policy.
- Initiating and supporting criminal legislative proceedings.
- Professional guidance of enforcement agencies in accordance with the law and case law on matters of broad significance and in individual cases.
- Supporting complex criminal cases handled in the Criminal Division and making appropriate decisions.
- Handling appeals on the closure of cases at the Attorney General's Office.
- Granting approval for filing indictments, in which the authority to handle has been delegated to the Deputy for Criminal Affairs from the Attorney General, for example, filing indictments for foreign offences; filing indictments for security offences; filing indictments for sexual offences within the family, while granting a special statute of limitations; filing an indictment against a minor, after the statute of limitations has expired; early approval for filing an indictment against elected officials; granting approval for filing a request to extend detention beyond 30 days without an indictment being filed; and more.
- Participation in decision-making in sensitive criminal cases, together with the Attorney General and the State Attorney.

==== Deputy State Attorney for Civil Affairs ====
Starting in January 2025, this position will be held by Attorney Eitan Lederer.

The Deputy State Attorney for Civil Affairs coordinates the work of the staff at the State Attorney's Office and deals with a variety of civil issues, from all areas of civil law, mainly questions with significant broad implications. The Deputy leads the broad policy agenda on civil issues that arise from the "everyday" life of the Civil Attorney's Office and the public agenda in general. The Deputy for Civil Affairs is responsible for the professional guidance in the civil field for all civil units in the State Attorney's Office: the six districts of the Attorney's Office and the staff units in the Civil Division: the Civil Department at the State Attorney's Office, the Fiscal Department, the Labor Law Department and the Civil Enforcement Unit.

==== Deputy State Attorney for Economic Enforcement ====
As of 2019 this position has been held by Attorney Liat Ben-Ari.

The Deputy State Attorney for Economic Enforcement heads the Integrated Economic Enforcement Headquarters, which was established in 2010 at the State Attorney's Office. The primary goal of the Integrated Economic Enforcement Headquarters is to increase the effectiveness of enforcement by the State Attorney's Office, through economic enforcement squads in the State Attorney's Office's districts, and through professional referents in the various State Attorney's Office units.

The duties of the Deputy State Attorney for Economic Enforcement:

- Serves as a knowledge hub for all units of the Prosecution Service in the areas of economic enforcement.
- Formulates professional guidelines in the areas of economic enforcement.
- Coordinates the activities of the Prosecution Service with the professional bodies in the Israel Police.
- Trains attorneys in the framework of professional training courses within and outside the Prosecution Service.
- Manages a professional forum "Confiscation and Economic Enforcement" in which all economic enforcement bodies participate – the Prosecution Service, the Israel Police, the Tax Authority, the Anti-Money Laundering Authority, and more.
- Collects and manages ongoing data.
- Monitors the activities of the economic enforcement units and their compliance with the goals and indicators set in the work plan.
- Professionally monitors "flag cases" related to the field of integrated economic enforcement. Initiates and monitors legislative procedures in the field of economic enforcement.
- Developing cooperation with units in the Prosecutor's Office and with entities outside the Prosecutor's Office.

==== Deputy State Attorney for Special Duties ====
As of May 2022 this position has been held by Attorney Alon Altman.

The Deputy State Attorney for Special Duties deals with criminal law in offences and issues related to state security, which have significant broad implications. This includes entrusting the Deputy State Attorney for Special Duties with enforcement of offences against state security and professional guidance in sensitive security cases, in cooperation with the IDF and the General Security Service (GSS).

The duties of the Deputy State Attorney for Special Duties:

- Centralizing the area of security offences in the State Attorney's Office and coordinating the Attorney's Office's activities with the defence establishment and the IDF.
- Supporting and guiding sensitive security investigations, and supporting sensitive cases involving offences against state security.
- Determining enforcement policy for offences against state security.
- Centralizing the handling of offences involving freedom of expression: Within this framework, the Deputy State Attorney for Special Duties decides to open a criminal investigation into offences such as: incitement to violence and terrorism, incitement to racism, insulting a public servant, incitement to evasion, support for a terrorist organization, and more. In appropriate cases, the Deputy State Attorney for Special Duties decides to file an indictment or expresses his opinion to the State Attorney or the Attorney General.
- Supporting the General Security Service on various issues related to its activities.
- Initiating and supporting legislative procedures in the areas of security.
- Managing an inter-ministerial team to coordinate law enforcement against Israelis in Judea and Samaria, established by government decision in 1994.
- Making decisions on whether to open a criminal investigation against Shin Bet investigators, based on complaints from interrogated individuals.

In addition to these duties, the Deputy State Attorney for Special Duties leads a number of national management projects, heads several work teams, and serves as chairman of the Ethics Committee at the State Attorney's Office.

=== Headquarter units ===
Each of the headquarters units is headed by a department director or unit director, who reports to the State Attorney.

The Prosecution Unit and the Appeals Unit report to the Deputy State Attorney for Criminal Matters. The Civil Enforcement Unit reports to the Deputy State Attorney for Civil Matters. Starting in 2002, the term of office of a department director is limited to 8 years, with the exception of department directors appointed before 2002, whose term is not limited.

- The Criminal Department represents the state in appeals and criminal appeals in the Supreme Court, headed by Attorney Rachel Mater-Skopsky as of 2019
- The Civil Department represents the state in civil appeals in the Supreme Court, headed by Attorney Israel Blum since 2016.
- The High Court of Justice Department handles petitions submitted to the Supreme Court in its capacity as the High Court of Justice (HCJ), appeals against decisions of administrative courts, requests for leave to appeal by prisoners, and other proceedings. The Department has been headed by Attorney Aner Helman since 2018
- The Economic Department handles criminal cases dealing with economic crime, headed by Attorney Ofra Levy since 2021.
- The Cyber Department is responsible for dealing with crime and terrorism in the online space, handles criminal cases for online offences, deals with the removal of illegal content online, and professionally supports all units of the Attorney General's Office on the subject of wiretapping and digital evidence. The unit has been headed by Dr. Adv. Chaim Wismonsky since 2016.
- The Fiscal Department is responsible for the field of taxes, in both civil and criminal aspects, and represents the state in appeals on tax issues in the Supreme Court. The department has been headed by Adv. Kamil Atila since 2016.
- The Labour Law Department is responsible for representing the state and the Attorney General in legal proceedings heard in the National Labour Court and the Supreme Court in the areas of Labour law and social security; the department is headed by Adv. Michal Leisser.
- The Department of International Affairs handles disputes between the state and countries or international organizations. The department is headed by Attorney Efrat Greenbaum.
- The Police Investigations Department (PID) is authorized to investigate suspected offences committed by a police officer, the penalty for which is more than a year in prison. The department has been headed since 2018 by Attorney Keren Bar Menachem.
- The Department for the Guidance of Qualified Prosecutors of the Attorney General (formerly the Department for the Enforcement of Real Estate Laws) deals with criminal offences in the field of planning and construction and guides local prosecutors throughout the country. In addition, it represents the state in appeals of offences in the fields of planning and construction in the Supreme Court. The department has been headed since 2017 by Attorney Bat Or Kahanovich.
- The Civil Enforcement Unit focuses on protecting state assets and initiates the filing of civil lawsuits in significant financial amounts on behalf of the state. The unit is headed by Attorney Ahuva Cohen.
- The Stay of Proceedings Unit deals with requests to stay proceedings filed by defendants in criminal trials. The unit is headed by Attorney Tamar Porush (acting as a substitute).
- The Appeals Unit deals with appeals filed against decisions of the police and district attorneys' offices. The unit is headed by Attorney Tamar Porush.
- The Management Unit is the State Attorney's headquarters body for managing the attorney's office. Its main function is to assist the various attorney's office units in formulating a strategy. The unit has been headed by Attorney Yariv Regev since 2013.

== District Attorney's Offices ==
In each geographical district, there are two district attorneys' offices: a criminal attorney's office, which is responsible for representing the state as the prosecutor in criminal cases that occur within its territory and that are handled by the attorney's office (as opposed to the police prosecution); and a civil attorney's office, which is responsible for representing the state as the plaintiff and defendant in civil proceedings. In Tel Aviv, there is a third district attorney's office, which deals with taxation and economic cases nationwide. The latest established district attorney's office is the Northern District Attorney's Office (Civil), which was established in 2018.

Each district attorney's office is headed by a district attorney, who is subordinate to the state attorney. The term of office of a district attorney is limited to 8 years. Under the district attorney is the deputy district attorney, and under them are heads of departments who are heads of teams responsible for the attorneys under them.

The district attorney's offices are:

=== Northern District Attorney's Office ===
- Northern District Attorney's Office (Criminal), headed by Attorney Ilana Yerushalmi since 2019.
- Northern District Attorney's Office (Civil) has been headed, since its establishment in 2018, by Attorney Eitan Lederer (who previously served as Haifa District Attorney (Civil).

=== Haifa District Attorney's Office ===
- Haifa District Attorney's Office (Civil) has been headed by Attorney Ayla Pyles-Sharon since 2018.
- Haifa District Attorney's Office (Criminal) has been headed by Attorney Hila Katz since 2021.

=== Central District Attorney's Office ===
- Central District Attorney's Office (Civil) headed by Attorney Lilach Dayan as of 2023 (except for the Central District Fiscal Department which still operates in the Tel Aviv District)
- Central District Attorney's Office (Criminal) headed by District Attorney Haim Wismonsky as of 2025

=== Jerusalem District Attorney's Office ===
- Jerusalem District Attorney's Office (Civil) (including Judea and Samaria) headed by Attorney Keren Yost as of 2023
- Jerusalem District Attorney's Office (Criminal) (including Judea and Samaria) headed by Attorney Danny Wittman as of 2017

=== Southern District Attorney's Office ===
- Southern District Attorney's Office (Civil) headed by Attorney Zion Iloz since 2016
- Southern District Attorney's Office (Criminal) headed by Attorney Erez Padan since 2022

=== Tel Aviv District Attorney's Office ===
- Tel Aviv District Attorney's Office (Civil) is headed by Attorney Merav Koenig-Wallerstein as of 2023
- Tel Aviv District Attorney's Office (Criminal) is headed by Attorney Ashra Gez-Eisenstein as of 2017
- Tel Aviv District Attorney's Office (Taxation and Economics) is headed by Attorney Yoni Tadmor as of 2020. The Taxation and Economics Attorney's Office specializes in handling white-collar offences – governmental and corporate corruption and economic offences, including complex securities and tax cases. Due to the nature of the cases and the district's specialization in the core issues it handles, the Taxation and Economics Attorney's Office handles cases nationwide.

== State Attorneys ==
Number	Name	Picture	Term of office	Public Positions After Retirement
1	Haim Cohn		1948–1949	Minister of Justice; Attorney General; Deputy President of the Supreme Court
2	Ervin Shomron		1950–1953	Chairman of the Committee to Investigate the Issue of Crime in Israel
3	Colin Gilon		1953–1961	Died during his term
Acting	S. Kvart		1961–1962	
4	Zvi Bar-Niv		1962–1969	President of the National Labour Court
5	Gabriel Bach		1969–1982	Supreme Court Judge
6	Yona Beltman		1982–1988	Auditor of the Hebrew University
7	Dorit Beinisch		1989–1995	President of the Supreme Court
8	Edna Arbel		1996–2004	Supreme Court Judge
9	Eran Shander		2004–2007	
10	Moshe Lador		2007–2013	
11	Shai Nitzan		2013–2019	Rector of the National Library
Acting	Dan Eldad		February to April 2020	
Acting	Avichai Mandelblit		April 2020 – January 2021	
12	Amit Isman		January to June 2021	Served as acting director from January 2021 to 27 June 2021
