= 30th Reconnaissance Squadron =

30th Reconnaissance Squadron

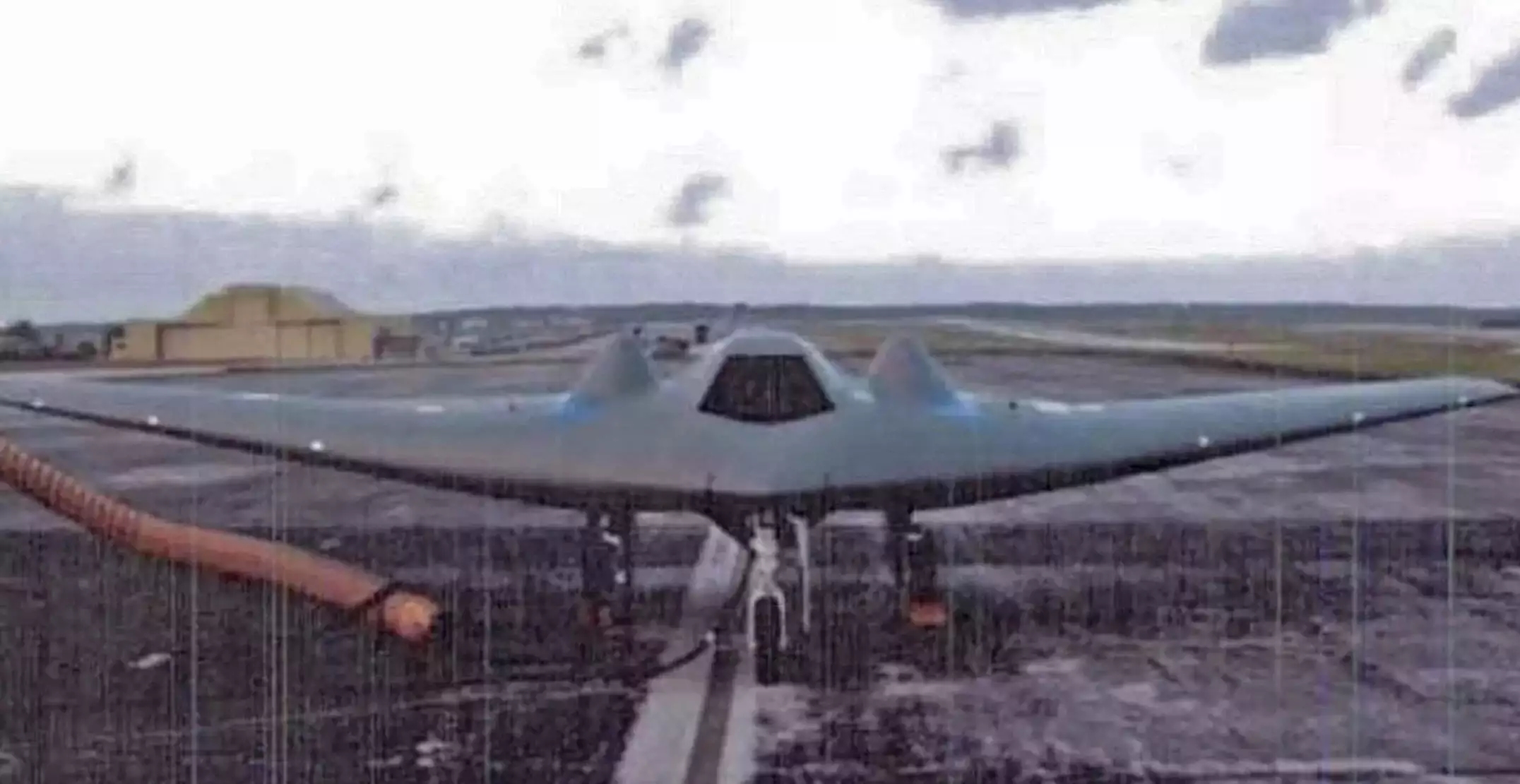
- RQ-170 photograph
- Active: 1943–1945; 1947–1951; 1953–1976; 2005–present
- Country: United States
- Branch: United States Air Force
- Role: Reconnaissance
- Part of: Air Combat Command
- Garrison/HQ: Creech Air Force Base, Nevada
- Engagements: European Theater of Operations; Cold War
- Decorations: Distinguished Unit Citation Air Force Meritorious Unit Award Air Force Outstanding Unit Award; Belgian Fourragère

Insignia
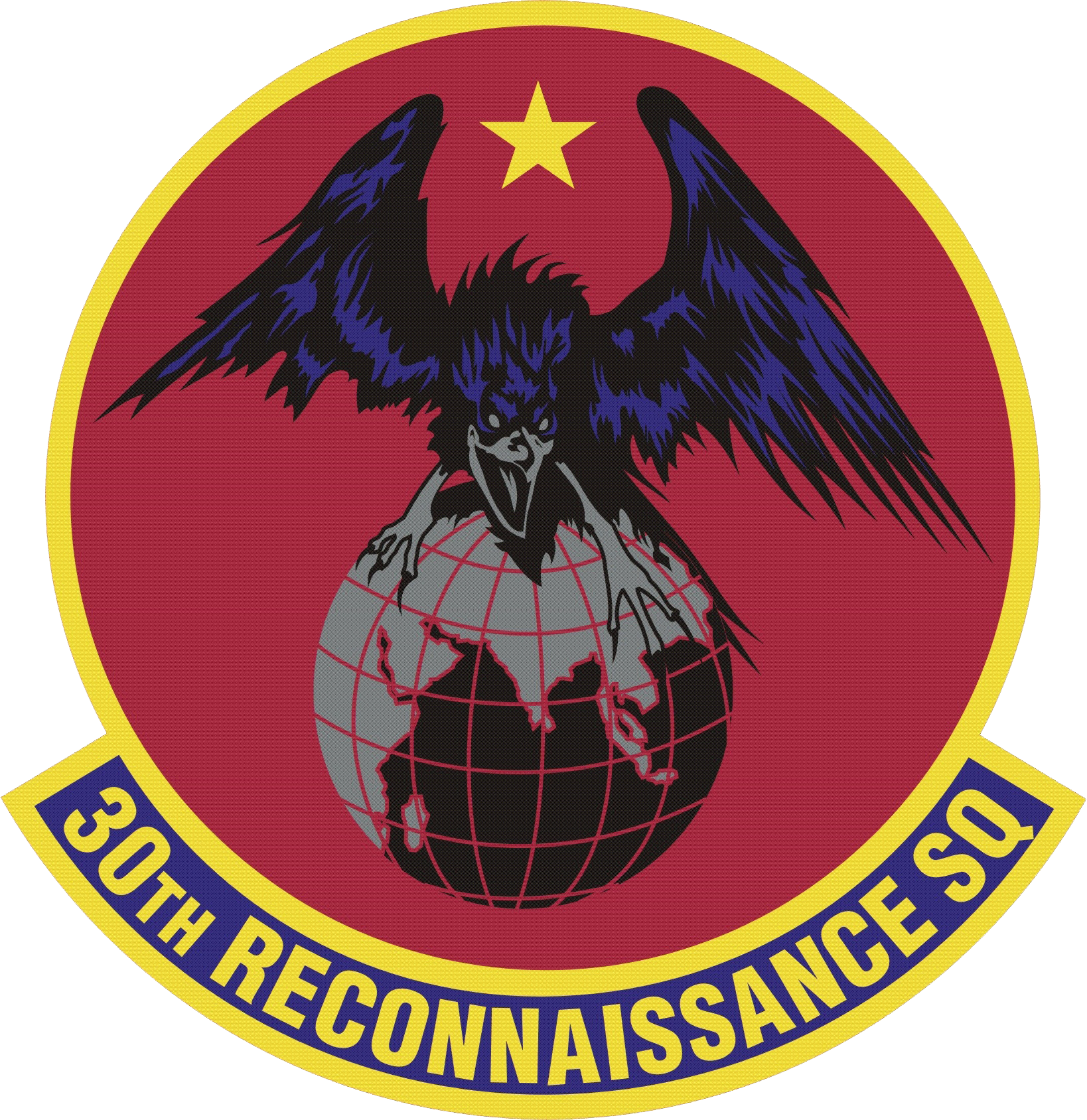
- 30th Reconnaissance Squadron emblem (Note: Approved 17 July 2007.)

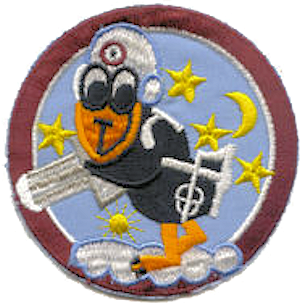
- 30th Tactical Reconnaissance Squadron emblem (Note: Approved 30 November 1954.)

Aircraft flown
- Reconnaissance: RQ-170 Sentinel

The 30th Reconnaissance Squadron is a reconnaissance test squadron assigned to the 432nd Operations Group, 432nd Wing at Creech Air Force Base, Nevada. The squadron flies the RQ-170 Sentinel Unmanned aerial vehicle out of the Tonopah Test Range Airport in Tonopah.

The squadron was previously assigned to the 57th Operations Group, 57th Wing, at Nellis Air Force Base, Nevada.

== Operations ==
Activated on 1 September 2005, at Tonopah Test Range Airport; and on 17 July 2007

In 2010 a detachment with RQ-170 Sentinels was sent to Al Dhafra Air Base in order to spy on the nuclear program of Iran.

== History ==
=== World War II ===
Established on 1 May 1943 as a Photographic Reconnaissance Squadron, initially trained under Second Air Force in Colorado; reassigned to Third Air Force in Oklahoma where the squadron received Lockheed F-4 Lightning reconnaissance aircraft.

Deployed to the European Theater of Operations (ETO) in England, being assigned to Ninth Air Force. Initially stationed at the Royal Air Force reconnaissance training school at RAF Chalgrove, later moved to RAF Middle Wallop, where the squadron became operational in the ETO. The squadron arrived in Chalgrove in late February 1944 and began operations in March. Engaged in unarmed and extremely hazardous combat operations over Occupied Europe, mapping 6,000 square miles (16,000 km^{2}) of the Netherlands and flew bomb-damage assessment missions over marshalling yards and gun emplacements in Belgium, the Netherlands, and France, in April 1944.

Earned a Distinguished Unit Citation for participation with 10th Photographic Group, 7–20 May 1944, in photo reconnaissance of Utah Beach for Normandy invasion. The citation read, in part: "Employing specially modified equipment installed in unarmed P-38 type aircraft, the intrepid pilots of the 10th Photographic Reconnaissance Group undertook the most hazardous missions. Flying unarmed and unescorted and at altitudes as low as twenty-five feet, they fearlessly piloted their aircraft over the difficult photographic runs in the face of intense fire from some of the strongest anti-aircraft installations in western Europe." Dicing, was the term used when referring to these extremely low-altitude flights over Utah Beach.

Flew sorties over France on D-Day making visual and photographic reconnaissance of bridges, artillery, road and rail junctions, traffic centers, airfields, and other targets. Moved into liberated area of France in early July, flying weather missions, made visual reconnaissance for ground forces, and photographed enemy positions to assist the First and Third Armies; Twelfth Army Group, and other Allied forces in the drive to Germany. Flew its first mission over Germany on 24 August 1944. Took part in the offensive against the Siegfried Line, Sep–Dec 1944, and in the Battle of the Bulge (Ardennes-Alsace), Dec 1944 – Jan 1945.

From then until the close of the war in Europe, the squadron photographed dams and bridges on the Roer River in preparation for the ground offensive to cross the river, and aided the Allied assault across the Rhine River and into Germany. Flew its 2,000th operational mission on 22 March 1945. Flew missions to Berlin on 8 April and to Dresden on 10 April 1945. Returned to the United States in July 1945, being assigned to Third Air Force, Continental Air Command at Drew Field, Florida. Squadron demobilized without becoming fully operational during the fall of 1945, inactivating on 7 November.

=== Reserve operations ===
Re-established at Newark Army Air Base, New Jersey in 1947 as a Tenth Air Force Air Force Reserve corollary unit under the guidance of active duty units at McGuire Air Force Base in order to train and maintain currency in reconnaissance operations for its reserve personnel. Primarily operated North American F-6 Mustangs (later RF-51Ds). Moved to McGuire from Newark in 1949 when consolidated due to budget restrictions. Was brought to active service in 1951 due to manpower needs during the Korean War, personnel and aircraft being reassigned as fillers to various active-duty units. Inactivated as a paper unit in May 1951.

=== Cold War reconnaissance ===
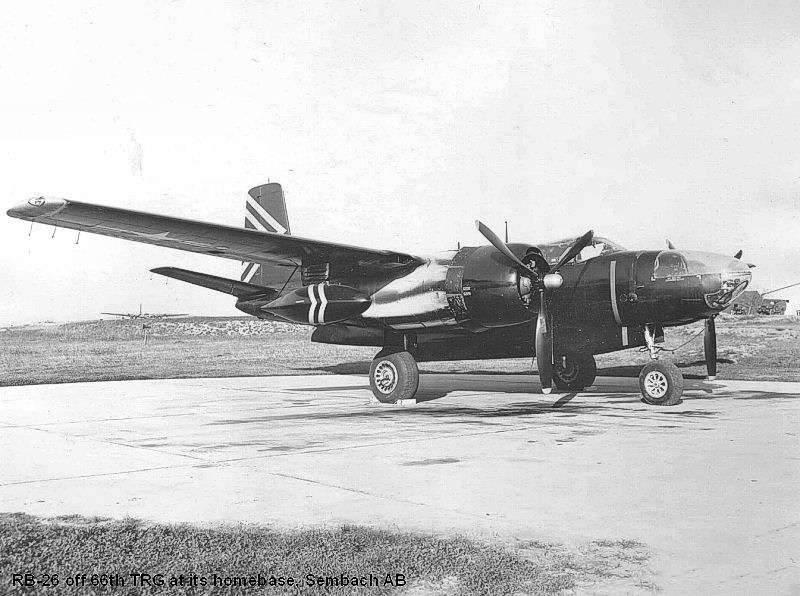
30th TRS RB-26 Invader night reconnaissance aircraft at Sembach AB, West Germany

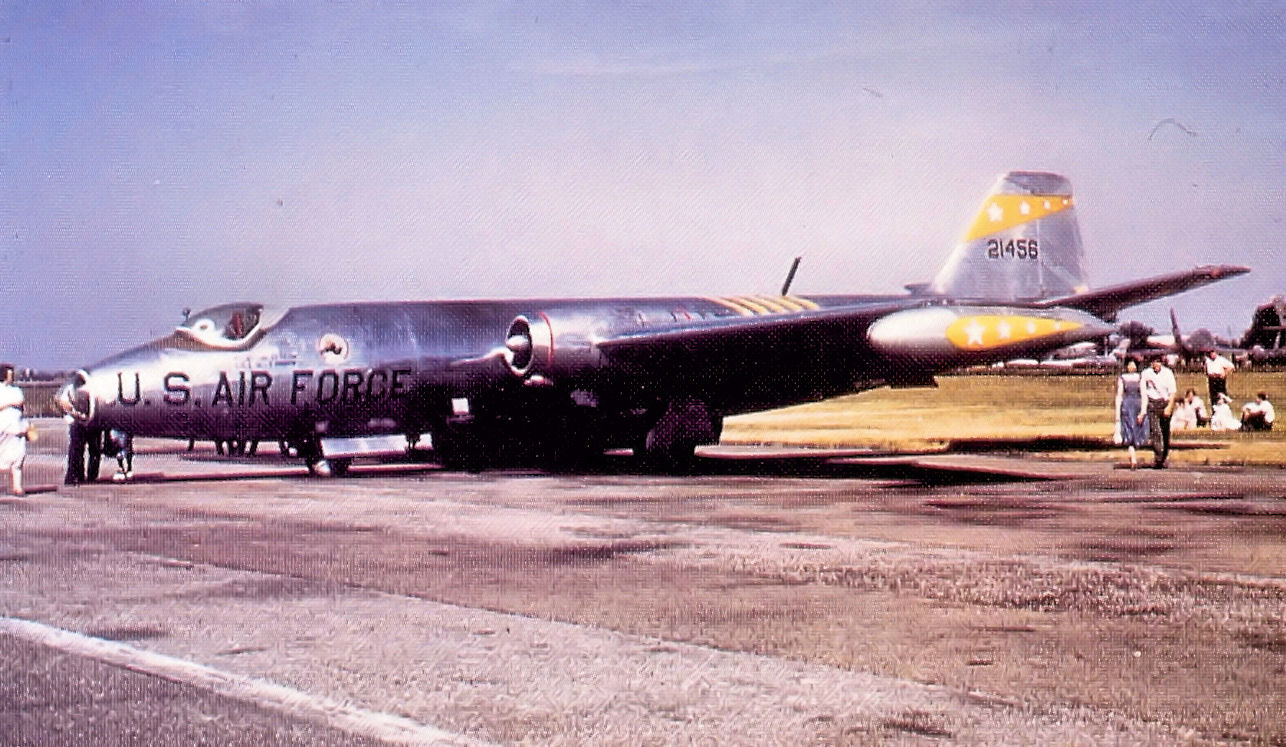
30th TRS Martin RB-57A 52-1456 in day markings

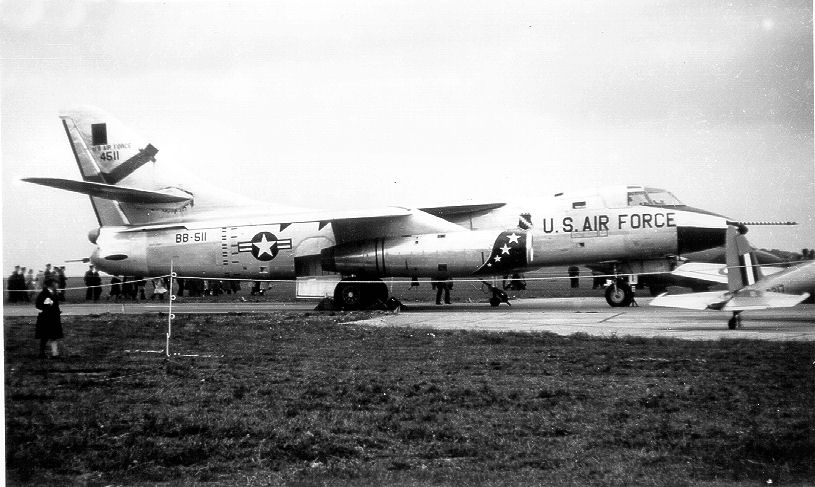
Douglas RB-66 54-511 at Spangdahlem AB, West Germany, 1958

Reactivated under Tactical Air Command at Shaw Air Force Base, South Carolina on 1 January 1953. Performed training of photo-reconnaissance pilots with Douglas RB-26 Invader aircraft. Deployed to NATO in July 1953, being assigned to the United States Air Forces in Europe at Sembach Air Base, West Germany; its host 66th Tactical Reconnaissance Wing being the initial unit based at the new air base. Trained in night reconnaissance with RB-26s; replaced with Martin RB-57A Canberra jet aircraft in 1955. Was reassigned to the 10th Tactical Reconnaissance Wing at Spangdahlem Air Base in 1958 as part of a USAFE reorganization. Upgraded to Douglas RB-66C Destroyers and continued night reconnaissance training. Moved to England in 1959 when Spangdahlem became a tactical fighter base. Operated from RAF Alconbury, however rotated frequently to Toul-Rosières Air Base, France where the 10th TRW operated a forward detachment until 1965.

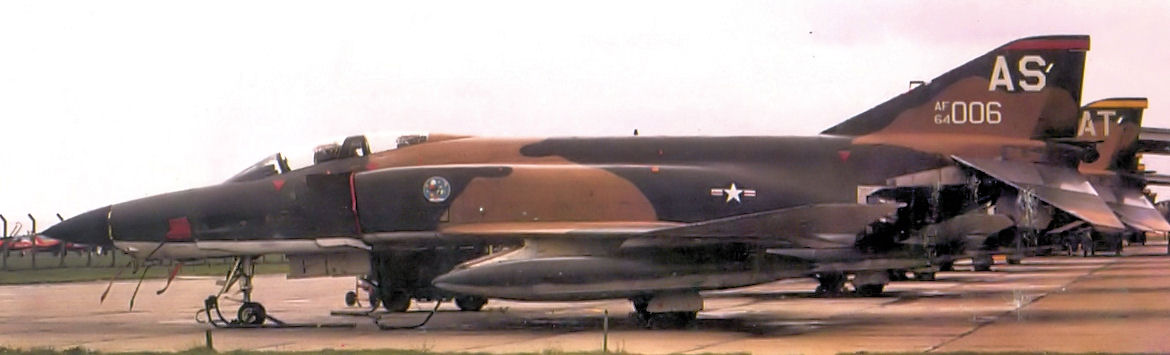
30th TRW RF-4C Phantom – 64-1006 at RAF Alconbury, about 1970

Re-equipped with the McDonnell RF-4C Phantom II reconnaissance aircraft in 1966; operated the day/night capable Phantom for 10 years until 1976 when inactivated due to budget reductions and the need for tactical reconnaissance aircraft was reduced to the increasing use of space reconnaissance assets.

=== Unmanned vehicle operations ===
Reactivated in 2005 and equipped with unmanned reconnaissance aircraft. In September 2026, the squadron was named as the Remotely Piloted Aircraft Squadron of the Year for 2025 by the Air Force Association and General Atomics. The citation noted that the squadron "conducted intrusive intelligence, surveillance, and reconnaissance missions across three areas of responsibility, filling critical intelligence gaps and disrupting enemy network, . . . rapidly pivoting resources to establish forward operating locations and execute critical missions under severely compressed timelines.“

== Lineage ==
- Constituted as the 30th Photographic Reconnaissance Squadron on 5 February 1943

Redesignated 30th Photographic Squadron (Light) on 6 February 1943
Activated on 1 May 1943
Redesignated 30th Photographic Reconnaissance Squadron on 11 August 1943
Inactivated on 7 November 1945

- Redesignated 30th Reconnaissance Squadron, Photo on 11 March 1947.

Activated in the reserve on 25 July 1947
Redesignated 30th Strategic Reconnaissance Squadron, Electronics on 27 June 1949
Ordered to active service on 1 May 1951
Inactivated on 16 May 1951

- Redesignated 30th Tactical Reconnaissance Squadron, Night-Photo on 15 November 1952

Activated on 1 January 1953
Redesignated: 30th Tactical Reconnaissance Squadron, Night Photo-Jet on 8 January 1957
Redesignated: 30th Tactical Reconnaissance Squadron on 1 October 1966
Inactivated on 1 April 1976

- Redesignated 30th Reconnaissance Squadron on 17 June 2005

Activated on 1 September 2005

=== Assignments ===
- 7th Photographic Group (later 7th Photographic Reconnaissance and Mapping Group), 1 May 1943
- Third Air Force, 21 June 1943
- III Reconnaissance Command, 12 October 1943
- Ninth Air Force, 4 February 1944
- 10th Photographic Group, 21 February 1944 (attached to 67th Tactical Reconnaissance Group after 9 June 1944)
- 67th Tactical Reconnaissance Group (later 67th Reconnaissance) Group), 13 June 1944 – 7 November 1945
- 66th Reconnaissance Group (later 66th Strategic Reconnaissance Group), 25 July 1947 – 16 May 1951
- 66th Tactical Reconnaissance Group, 1 January 1953
- 66th Tactical Reconnaissance Wing, 8 December 1957 (tached to 10th Tactical Reconnaissance Wing after 8 January 1958)
- 10th Tactical Reconnaissance Wing, 8 March 1958 – 1 April 1976
- 57th Operations Group, 1 September 2005
- 432d Operations Group, 1 May 2007 – present

=== Stations ===
- Peterson Field, Colorado, 1 May 1943
- Will Rogers Field, Oklahoma, 10 October 1943
- Camp Kilmer, New Jersey, 3–17 Jan 1944
- RAF Chalgrove (AAF-465), England, 1 February 1944
- RAF Middle Wallop (AAF-449), England, 17 May 1944
- Le Molay Airfield (A-9), France, 3 July 1944
- Toussus Le Noble Airfield (A-46), France, 31 August 1944
- Charleroi-Gosselies Airfield (A-87), Belgium, 22 September 1944 (operated from Florennes Juzaine Airfield (A-78), Belgium, 8–18 Dec 1944)
- Vogelsang Airfield (Y-51), Germany, 24 March 1945
- Limburg Airfield (Y-83), Germany, 2 April 1945

- Eschwege Airfield (R-11), Germany, 11 April – July 1945
- Drew Field, Florida, 20 September – 7 November 1945
- Newark Army Air Base, New Jersey, 25 July 1947
- McGuire Air Force Base, New Jersey, 27 June 1949
- Barksdale Air Force Base, Louisiana, 10 October 1949 – 16 May 1951
- Shaw Air Force Base, South Carolina, 1 January 1953
- Sembach Air Base, West Germany, 8 July 1953
- Spangdahlem Air Base, West Germany, 8 January 1958
- RAF Alconbury, England, 25 August 1959 – 1 April 1976 (operated from Moron Air Base, Spain, 9 May-10 Jun 1968)
- Tonopah Test Range Airport, Nevada, 1 September 2005 – 30 June 2012
- Creech Air Force Base, Nevada, 1 July 2012 – present

=== Aircraft ===
- Lockheed F-4 Lightning, 1943
- Lockheed F-5 Lightning, 1943–1945
- North American F-6 (later RF-51D) Mustang, 1947–1951
- Douglas RB-26B Invader, 1953–1955
- Martin RB-57 Canberra, 1955–1957
- Douglas RB-66C Destroyer, 1957–1965
- McDonnell RF-4C Phantom II, 1965–1976
- RQ-170 Sentinel, 2005–present
