= 24th Intelligence Squadron =

United States Air Force unit stationed at Ramstein Air Base, Germany

24th Intelligence Squadron
- Active: 1942–1945; 1992–1995; 2003–present
- Country: United States
- Branch: United States Air Force
- Role: Intelligence
- Part of: Air Combat Command
- Garrison/HQ: Ramstein Air Base, Germany
- Engagements: European Theater of Operations
- Decorations: Distinguished Unit Citation; Air Force Meritorious Unit Award; Air Force Outstanding Unit Award; Belgian Fourragère

Insignia
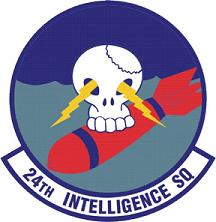
- 24th Intelligence Squadron emblem

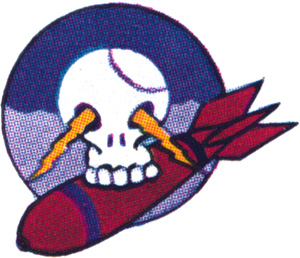
- 24th Observation Squadron emblem (approved 10 October 1942)

The 24th Intelligence Squadron is an active United States Air Force unit stationed at Ramstein Air Base, Germany. The squadron was first activated as the 24th Observation Squadron during World War II. it conducted aerial reconnaissance training, until converting to the photographic mission as the 33d Photographic Reconnaissance Squadron. It deployed to the European Theater of Operations, where it conducted combat reconnaissance missions, earning a Distinguished Unit Citation and being cited in the Belgian Army Order of the Day on two occasions. It remained in Europe following V-E Day, becoming non operational in August 1945. Its ground echelon returned to the United States in the fall of 1945 and it was inactivated at the port of embarkation.

The squadron was redesignated the 24th Air Intelligence Squadron and activated in Panama in 1992. It provided intelligence support until it was inactivated in 1995 as the United States withdrew its forces from Panama. The squadron was reactivated in its current role in 2002.

== Mission ==
The 24th Intelligence Squadron plans, directs and conducts multi-source intelligence, surveillance and reconnaissance (ISR) tasking, processing, exploitation and dissemination operations in support of United States Air Forces Europe, United States European Command, United States Africa Command, United States Central Command, NATO, and joint and combined force air component commanders. The squadron operates two primary mission systems: Distributed Common Ground System (DGS-4) and Eagle Vision One.

DGS-4 is a part of the Distributed Common Ground System, which is the Air Force's AN/GSQ-272 "Sentinel" weapon system. DGS-4 is one of five core sites executing collection, processing, exploitation and dissemination of intelligence data derived from Air Force ISR platforms including Lockheed U-2 and General Atomics MQ-1 Predator unmanned aerial vehicles. DGS-4 is the only DGS involved in operations across three different commands on a recurring basis.

Eagle Vision One executes collection, processing, exploitation and dissemination of commercial satellite imagery. The 24th Intelligence Squadron's Eagle Vision One is one of five Eagle Vision systems worldwide. It is the only active duty Eagle Vision unit with its own pool of Eagle Vision imagery analysts. Eagle Vision is a deployable ground station with the capability to produce CSI and geospatial products.

== History ==
=== World War II reconnaissance ===
The squadron was first activated at Army Air Base, Wilmington in late February 1942 as the 24th Observation Squadron, one of the three original squadrons of the 76th Observation Group. The squadron trained with various single engine and twin engine aircraft in aerial reconnaissance and ground support missions and supported the training of Army ground units through May 1943. Starting in May 1943, the squadron assisted in Second Army maneuvers.

In August 1943, the squadron mission was changed from visual to photographic reconnaissance and it was redesignated the 33d Photographic Reconnaissance Squadron and relieved from the 76th Group. in April 1944, the squadron deployed to the European Theater of Operations.

At its first combat station, RAF Chalgrove, the squadron equipped with long-range Lockheed F-5 Lightnings. The squadron engaged in tactical reconnaissance over the Normandy Beaches of France prior to the Allied invasion on D-Day, 6 June 1944. Afterwards engaged in highly dangerous unarmed reconnaissance of Northern France, the Low Countries and Germany as Allied armies moved west during the Northern France Campaign during the balance of 1944 and the Allied Invasion of Western Germany, spring 1945. Provided battlefield intelligence primarily to the United States Third Army, however also flew reconnaissance missions for the United States First and Ninth Armies as requested.

Assigned to the United States Air Forces in Europe after the V-E Day, was part of the Army of Occupation in Germany before becoming non-operational in August 1945. The squadron inactivated in October 1945.

=== Intelligence operations ===
In 1992, the squadron returned to its original number as the 24th Air Intelligence Squadron and was activated at Howard Air Force Base, Panama to provide intelligence support for Air Force activities in South and Central America. It continued this mission until inactivating in 1995 as the United States withdrew its forces from Panama.

The squadron reactivated at Ramstein Air Base, Germany on 8 January 2003 as the 24th Intelligence Squadron.

== Lineage ==
- Constituted as the 24th Observation Squadron (Light) on 5 February 1942

Activated on 6 March 1942
Redesignated 24th Observation Squadron on 4 July 1942
Redesignated 24th Reconnaissance Squadron (Bombardment) on 2 April 1943
Redesignated 33d Photographic Reconnaissance Squadron on 11 August 1943
Inactivated on 4 October 1945

- Redesignated 24th Air Intelligence Squadron on 1 February 1992

Activated on 11 February 1992
Inactivated on 1 December 1995

- Redesignated 24th Intelligence Squadron on 17 December 2002

Activated on 8 January 2003

=== Assignments ===
- 76th Observation Group (later 76th Reconnaissance Group), 27 February 1942
- III Reconnaissance Command (later III Tactical Air Command), 11 August 1943
- 10th Photographic Group, 1 May 1944
- 67th Tactical Reconnaissance Group, 13 June 1944 (attached to 10th Photographic Group until 11 August 1944)
- XXIX Tactical Air Command (Provisional), 7 October 1944 (attached to 67th Tactical Reconnaissance Group until 2 November 1944)
- 363d Tactical Reconnaissance Group, 30 October 1944
- 67th Tactical Reconnaissance (later 67 Reconnaissance Group), 17 May 1945
- 363d Reconnaissance Group, c. 5 July 1945
- Unknown (probably Boston Port of Embarkation), c. 20 August–4 October 1945
- 24th Operations Group, 11 February 1992 – 1 December 1995
- United States Air Forces in Europe Air and Space Operations Center, 8 January 2003
- 616th Support Group, 1 November 2005
- 603d Support Group, 1 December 2006
- 693d Intelligence, Surveillance and Reconnaissance Group, 1 April 2008 – present

=== Stations ===
- Army Air Base, Wilmington, North Carolina, 27 February 1942
- Pope Field, North Carolina, 28 March 1942
- Vichy Army Air Field, Missouri, 14 December 1942
- Morris Field, North Carolina, 8 May 1943
- Gainesville Army Air Field, Texas, 30 October 1943
- Will Rogers Field, Oklahoma, 16 January–12 April 1944
- Camp Shanks, New York, 14–17 April 1944
- RAF Chalgrove (Sta 465), England, 27 April 1944
- Le Molay Airfield (A-9), France, 15 August 1944
- Toussus le Noble Airfield (A-46), France, 30 August 1944
- Gosselies Airfield (A-87), Belgium, 21 September 1944
- Le Culot Airfield (A-89), Belgium, 5 November 1944
- Venlo Airfield (Y-55), Netherlands, 10 March 1945
- Gutersloh Airfield (Y-99), Germany, 16 April 1945
- Braunschweig Airfield (probably R-37),. (Note: There were two airfields used by American forces in Braunschweig (Brunswick). Brunswick-Waggum (R-37) and Brunswick-Broitzem (R-38).) Germany, 25 April 1945
- Eschwege Airfield (R-11), Germany, 17 May 1945
- Camp Detroit, France, 23 August 1945 (ground echelon)
- Camp Twenty Grand, France, 15–24 September 1945 (ground echelon)
- Camp Myles Standish, Massachusetts, 3–4 Oct 1945
- Howard Air Force Base, Panama, 11 February 1992 – 1 December 1995
- Ramstein Air Base, Germany, 8 January 2003 – present

=== Aircraft ===
- Douglas A-20 Havoc, 1942–1944
- North American B-25 Mitchell, 1942–1944
- Douglas DB-7 Boston, 1942–1944
- Piper L-4 Grasshopper, 1942–1944
- Bell P-39 Airacobra, 1942–1944
- Republic P-43 Lancer, 1942–1944
- North American F-6 Mustang, 1942–1944
- Lockheed F-5 Lightning, 1944–1945

== Awards and campaigns ==
Award streamer	Award	Dates	Notes
	Presidential Unit Citation	France 6–20 May 1944	33d Photographic Reconnaissance Squadron
	Air Force Meritorious Unit Award	1 June 2014–31 May 2015	24th Intelligence Squadron
	Air Force Meritorious Unit Award	1 June 2015–31 May 2016	24th Intelligence Squadron
	Air Force Outstanding Unit Award	11 February 1992-31 July 1993	24th Air Intelligence Squadron
	Air Force Outstanding Unit Award	1 January 2006–31 December 2007	24th Intelligence Squadron
	Air Force Outstanding Unit Award	1 June 2009–31 May 2011	24th Intelligence Squadron
	Belgian Fourragère	[12 August-28] September 1944; [6 November]-17 December 1944; 18 December 1944–[14] January 1945	24th Intelligence Squadron

Campaign Streamer	Campaign	Dates	Notes
	American Theater without inscription	27 February 1942 – 12 April 1944	24 Observation Squadron (later 24th Reconnaissance Squadron, 33d Photographic Reconnaissance Squadron)
	Air Offensive, Europe	27 April 1944 – 5 June 1944	33d Photographic Reconnaissance Squadron
	Normandy	6 June 1944 – 24 July 1944	33d Photographic Reconnaissance Squadron
	Northern France	25 July 1944 – 14 September 1944	33d Photographic Reconnaissance Squadron
	Rhineland	15 September 1944 – 21 March 1945	33d Photographic Reconnaissance Squadron
	Ardennes-Alsace	16 December 1944 – 25 January 1945	33d Photographic Reconnaissance Squadron
	Central Europe	22 March 1944 – 21 May 1945	33d Photographic Reconnaissance Squadron
	Air Combat, EAME Theater	27 April 1944 – 11 May 1945	33d Photographic Reconnaissance Squadron
