= 566th Intelligence Squadron =

Coordinates: 39°42′06″N 104°45′06″W

566th Intelligence Squadron
- Active: 1944–58; 1993–present
- Country: United States
- Branch: United States Air Force
- Role: Military intelligence
- Part of: Air Combat Command
- Garrison/HQ: Buckley Space Force Base, Colorado
- Nickname(s): Blue Train
- Motto(s): All Aboard
- Engagements: European Theater of Operations
- Decorations: Air Force Outstanding Unit Award with Combat "V" Device; Army Meritorious Unit Commendation; Air Force Outstanding Unit Award

Commanders
- Current commander: Lt Col Joanna Zemek

Insignia
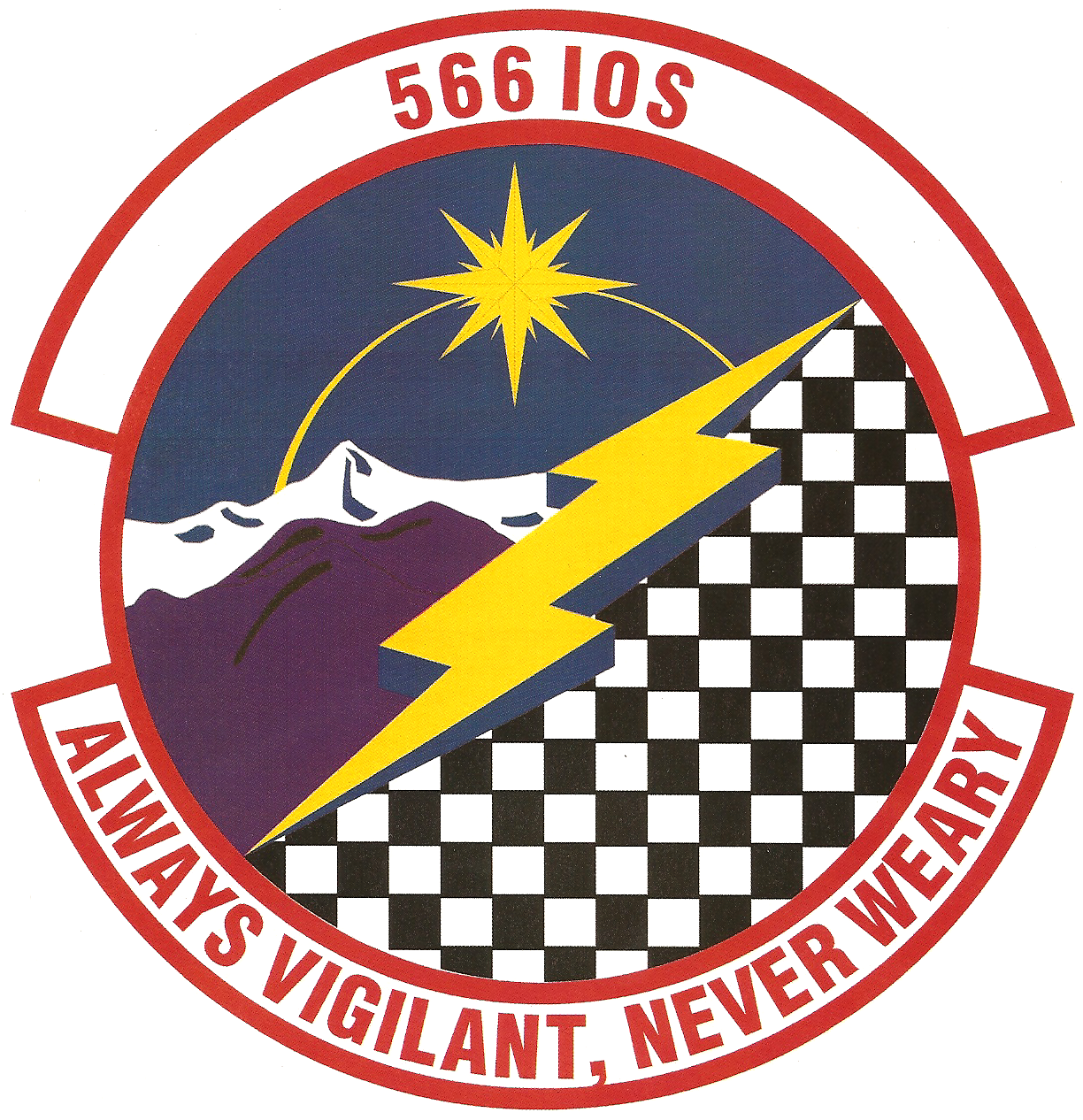
- 566th Intelligence Squadron emblem (approved 6 July 1999)

The 566th Intelligence Squadron is a support unit to the Aerospace Data Facility in conjunction with the Buckley Garrison, Buckley Space Force Base, Colorado. The 566th is part of the 544th Intelligence, Surveillance and Reconnaissance Group, headquartered at Buckley Space Force Base, Colorado.

The squadron's mission is to provide the Aerospace Data Facility-Colorado with information and technical support in the performance of joint national system missions.

== History ==
The 566th Information Operations Squadron (IOS) began during World War II, when the 16th Photographic Technical Unit was activated on 5 November 1944, at Charleroi, Belgium. The 16th was a squadron to the 67th Tactical Reconnaissance Group and the 16th was assigned to several bases in Europe: Vogelsang, Limburg, and Eschwege, Germany, and France. After World War II, the unit moved to MacDill Field, Florida, where it was decommissioned on 21 December 1945. The 66th Reconnaissance Technical Squadron was Constituted on 15 November 1952 and Activated on 1 January 1953 at Shaw AFB. SC relocated to Shaw AFB, SC: 1 Jan–25 June 1953; Sembach AB, West Germany on 7 July 1953 and moved to Kaiserslautern, West Germany on 13 August 1953 till the unit was Inactivated on 8 February 1958. While the unit was inactive the 66th Reconnaissance Technical Squadron was Consolidated on 16 October 1984 and the New Unit was designated as the 16th Reconnaissance Technical Squadron.

The unit remained inactive until 7 September 1993, when the 16th Intelligence Squadron was activated at Buckley Air National Guard Base, Colorado. The unit was re-designated the 566th Operations Support Squadron (OSS) on 1 October 1995. Renamed later as the 566th Information Operations Squadron (IOS) on 1 August 2000, this unit aided Buckley in its transition from an Air National Guard base to an active duty Air Force base.

== Lineage ==
16th Photographic Technical Unit

- Constituted as the 16th Photographic Technical Unit and activated on 5 November 1944

Inactivated on 21 December 1945

- Consolidated with the 66th Reconnaissance Technical Squadron on 16 October 1984 as the 16th Reconnaissance Technical Squadron

66th Reconnaissance Technical Squadron

- Constituted as the 66th Reconnaissance Technical Squadron on 15 November 1952

Activated on 1 January 1953
Inactivated on 8 February 1958

- Consolidated with the 16th Photographic Technical Unit on 16 October 1984 as the 16th Reconnaissance Technical Squadron

16th (566th) Intelligence Squadron

- Redesignated 16th Intelligence Squadron on 3 September 1993

Activated on 7 September 1993
Redesignated 566th Operations Support Squadron on 1 October 1995
Redesignated 566th Information Operations Squadron on 1 August 2000
Redesignated 566th Intelligence Squadron on 1 April 2007

=== Assignments ===
- 67th Tactical Reconnaissance Group, 5 November 1944 – 21 December 1945
- 66th Tactical Reconnaissance Wing, 1 January 1953 – 8 February 1958
- 544th Intelligence Group (later 544th Information Operations Group, 544th Intelligence Group, 544th Intelligence, Surveillance and Reconnaissance Group), 7 September 1993 – present

=== Stations ===
- Charleroi, Belgium, 5 November 1944
- Vogelsang, Germany, 25 March 1945
- Limburg, Germany, 3 April 1945
- Eschwege, Germany, 12 April 1945
- France, 5–16 September 1945
- Drew Field, Florida, 20 September 1945
- MacDill Field, Florida, 20 September-21 December 1945
- Shaw Air Force Base, South Carolina, 1 January-25 June 1953
- Sembach Air Base, Germany, 7 July 1953
- Kaiserslautern, Germany, 13 August 1953 – 8 February 1958
- Buckley Air National Guard Base (later Buckley Air Force Base, Buckley Space Force Base), Colorado, 7 September 1993 – present

== List of commanders ==
- Lt Col David Scanlon, 30 June 2009
- Lt Col Adam Stone, 24 June 2011
- Lt Col Chandler P. Atwood, July 2015 – July 2017
- Lt Col Creighton Mullins, July 2017 - June 2019
- Lt Col Ryan Skaggs, June 2019 - June 2021
- Lt Col James Nolan, June 2021 - June 2023
- Lt Col Alma Hernandez, June 2023 - June 2025
- Lt Col Joanna Zemek, June 2025 -
