= Eagle Vision 1 (Commercial Satellite Imagery) =

EAGLE VISION ONE
- Eagle Vision 1 Logo
- Active: 2001 – present
- Country: United States
- Allegiance: United States of America
- Branch: United States Air Force
- Type: Commercial satellite imagery
- Role: Commercial Satellite Imagery
- Part of: AFISRA, 480th Intelligence, Surveillance and Reconnaissance Wing, 693d Intelligence, Surveillance and Reconnaissance Group, 24th Intelligence Squadron
- Garrison/HQ: Ramstein Air Base, Germany

Eagle Vision One (EV1) was a military based Commercial Satellite Imagery (CSI) capability programmed and funded by HQ AF/A2QS (Air Force ISR Innovations). It is located at Ramstein Air Base, Germany, and is staffed by intelligence personnel assigned to the 24th Intelligence Squadron (24IS). The mission of EV1 is to maintain a deployable commercial satellite imagery system ready to support contingency operations, theater security cooperation events, and disaster relief efforts. The EV1 system consists of the two elements: a Data Acquisition Segment (DAS) which includes a direct downlink antenna and a computer server shelter that collects and processes imagery into a standard format, and a transit-cased Data Integration Segment (DIS) that processes the standard format products into useful products.

EV1 works with satellite vendors from France (Spot 6 & 7, Pléiades 1A & 1B), Canada (RADARSAT 1 & 2), and India (CARTOSAT1 & 2) to provide unclassified imagery to customers.

EV1 is part of a larger Eagle Vision enterprise that consists of four other units stationed in South Carolina, Alabama, California, and Hawaii.

Newest tools at EV1: EVR2EST is an unclassified imagery server used to upload and share imagery products. See the link below to view the EVR2EST server.
