= 485th Intelligence Squadron =

- Active: 1953–1955; 1962–1992 1995-present
- Country: United States
- Branch: United States Air Force
- Role: Intelligence
- Part of: Air Combat Command
- Garrison/HQ: Mainz-Kastel, Germany
- Motto: Airborne's Finest (1980-1992)
- Decorations: Air Force Outstanding Unit Award with Combat "V" Device; Air Force Outstanding Unit Award

Insignia
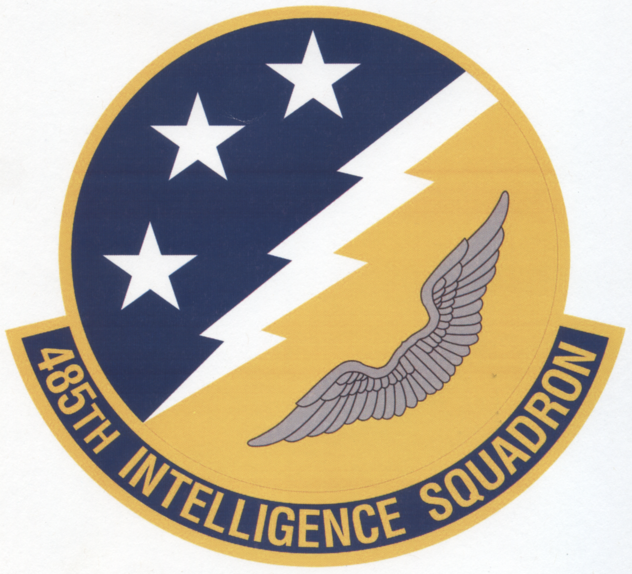
- 485th Intelligence Squadron emblem (Note: Approved 21 July 1998.)

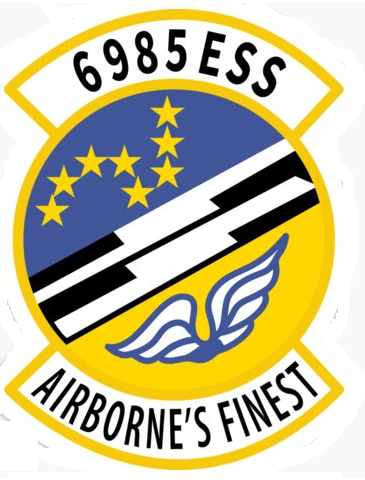
- 6985th Electronic Security Squadron emblem (Note: Approved 10 November1980.)

The United States Air Force's 485th Intelligence Squadron is an intelligence unit located at Mainz-Kastel, Germany.

== History ==
The first predecessor of the squadron was activated as the 85th Radio Squadron, Mobile at Kelly Air Force Base, Texas on 8 December 1953, after organizing and training, the squadron moved to Sembach Air Base, Germany in May 1954. On 8 May 1955, it was inactivated as the 6914th Radio Squadron, Mobile (Note: This is not the same unit as the 6914th Electronic Security Squadron activated at Sembach in 1986, despite the similar name and same location.) assumed its mission, equipment and personnel.

The squadron's second predecessor was activated on 1 July 1962 as the 6985th Radio Squadron, Mobile at Eielson Air Force Base, Alaska. A year later it was redesignated the 6985th Security Squadron, and in 1979, the 6985th Electronic Security Squadron. The squadron served at Eielson until inactivating in 1992.

In May 1995, the 85th and 6985th Squadrons were consolidated as the 485th Intelligence Squadron. The consolidated squadron was activated in July at Mainz-Kastel, Germany.

== Lineage ==
85th Radio Squadron

- Constituted as the 85th Radio Squadron, Mobile on 4 August 1953

Activated on 8 December 1953
Inactivated on 8 May 1955
Disbanded on 15 June 1983
Reconstituted and consolidated with the 6985th Electronic Security Squadron as the 485th Intelligence Squadron on 10 May 1995

485th Intelligence Squadron

- Designated as the 6985th Radio Squadron, Mobile and activated on 1 July 1962

Redesignated 6985th Security Squadron on 1 July 1963
Redesignated 6985 Electronic Security Squadron on 1 August 1979
Inactivated on 30 June 1992

- Consolidated with the 6985th Electronic Security Squadron as the 485th Intelligence Squadron on 10 May 1995

Activated on 1 July 1995

=== Assignments ===
- United States Air Force Security Service, 8 December 1953
- 6910th Security Group, 19 May 1954 – 8 May 1955
- 6981st Radio Group, Mobile (later 6981st Security Group), 1 July 1962
- 6944th Security Wing, 1 July 1974
- United States Air Force Security Service (later Electronic Security Command), 1 March 1979
- 6949th Electronic Security Group, 1 January 1980
- Electronic Security, Strategic, 1 August 1981
- Electronic Security, Alaska, 1 October 1983
- Pacific Electronic Security Division (later 692d Intelligence Wing), 1 June 1989 – 30 June 1992
- 26th Intelligence Group (later 26th Information Operations Group), 1 July 1995
- 70th Mission Support Group, 5 July 2006
- 693d Intelligence Group (later 693d Intelligence, Surveillance and Reconnaissance Group), 12 July 2007 – present

=== Stations ===
- Kelly Air Force Base, Texas, 8 December 1953 – 17 April 1954
- Sembach Air Base, Germany, 2 May 1954 – 8 May 1955
- Eielson Air Force Base, Alaska, 1 July 1962 – 30 June 1992
- Mainz-Kastel, Germany, 1 July 1995 – present

=== Awards ===
Award streamer	Award	Dates	Notes
	Air Force Outstanding Unit Award with Combat "V" Device	1 July 2002-31 May 2003	485th Intelligence Squadron
	Air Force Outstanding Unit Award	1 January 1963-31 December 1964	6985th Radio Squadron, Mobile (later 6985th Security Squadron)
	Air Force Outstanding Unit Award	1 July 1968-30 June 1970	6985th Security Squadron
	Air Force Outstanding Unit Award	1 July 1970-30 April 1972	6985th Security Squadron
	Air Force Outstanding Unit Award	1 July 1972-30 June 1974	6985th Security Squadron
	Air Force Outstanding Unit Award	1 July 1974-30 June 1976	6985th Security Squadron
	Air Force Outstanding Unit Award	1 July 1991-30 June 1992	6985th Electronic Security Squadron
	Air Force Outstanding Unit Award	1 July 1995-30 September 1995 (Note: Bailey gives start date for the award as 1 October 1994, but the unit was not active until July 1995.)	485th Intelligence Squadron
	Air Force Outstanding Unit Award	1 October 1996-30 September 1997	485th Intelligence Squadron
	Air Force Outstanding Unit Award	1 October 1997-30 September 1998	485th Intelligence Squadron
	Air Force Outstanding Unit Award	1 October 1999-30 September 2000	485th Intelligence Squadron
	Air Force Outstanding Unit Award	1 June 2001-31 May 2002	485th Intelligence Squadron
	Air Force Outstanding Unit Award	1 June 2003-31 May 2005	485th Intelligence Squadron
	Air Force Outstanding Unit Award	1 June 2006-31 May 2007	485th Intelligence Squadron
	Air Force Outstanding Unit Award	1 June 2009-31 May 2011	485th Intelligence Squadron
