= 450th Intelligence Squadron =

- Active: 1974–1995; 2007–present
- Country: United States
- Branch: United States Air Force
- Role: Intelligence
- Part of: Air Combat Command
- Garrison/HQ: Ramstein Air Base, Germany
- Decorations: Air Force Meritorious Unit Award; Air Force Outstanding Unit Award

Insignia
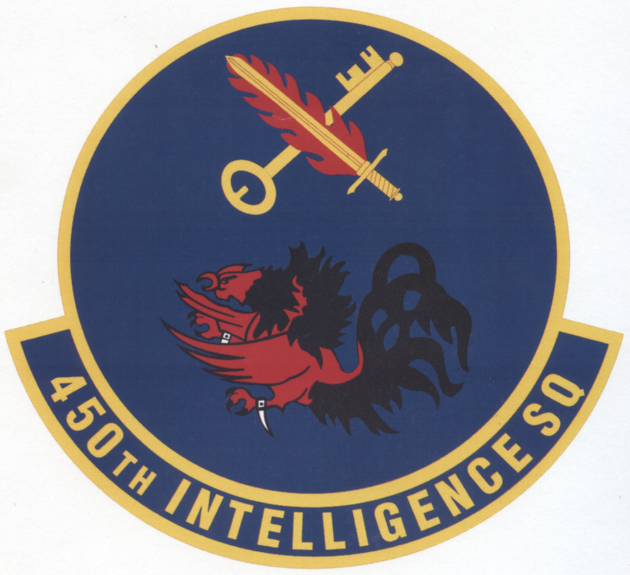
- 450th Intelligence Squadron emblem (approved 25 September 2007

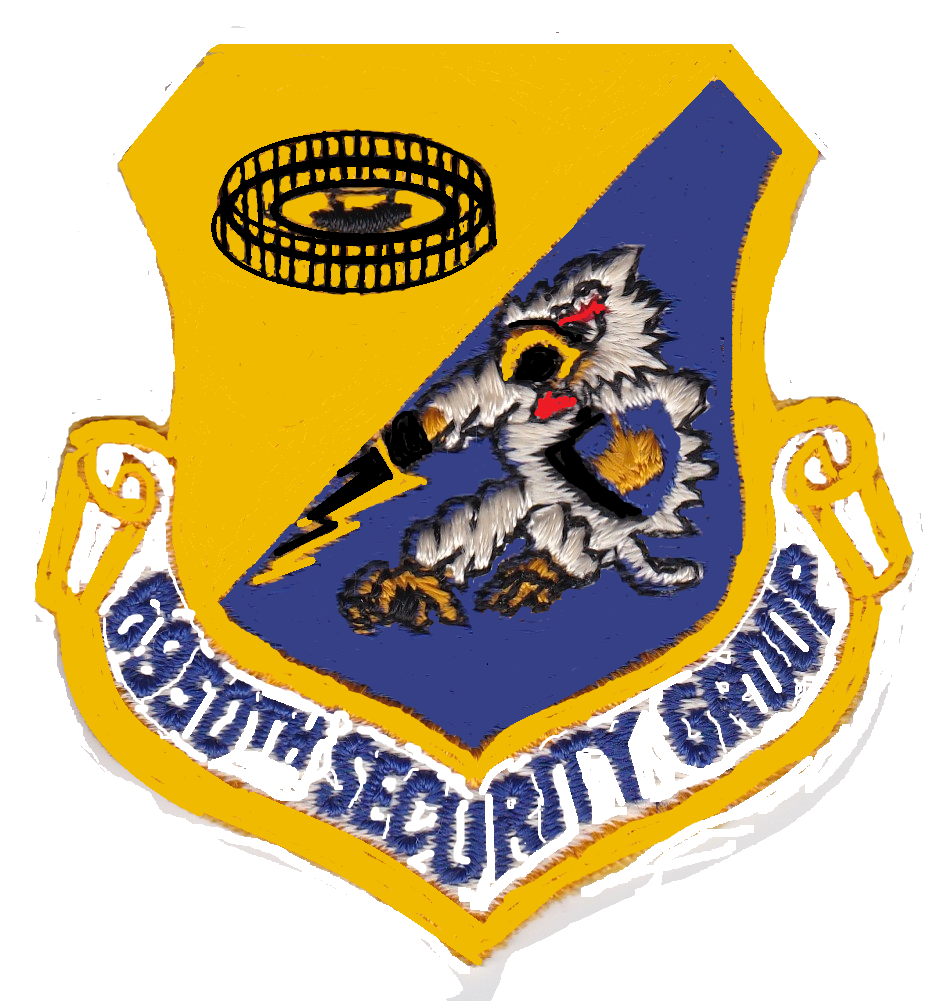
- 6950th Electronic Security Group emblem

The United States Air Force's 450th Intelligence Squadron is an intelligence unit located at Ramstein Air Base, Germany. The squadron was first activated in July 1974 as the 6950th Security Squadron and served as an intelligence gathering unit in the United Kingdom until inactivating in 1995. It was reactivated in 2007.

== Lineage ==
- Designated as the 6950th Security Squadron and activated on 1 July 1974

Redesignated 6950th Electronic Security Group on 1 August 1979
Redesignated 450th Intelligence Squadron on 1 October 1993
Inactivated on 30 June 1995

- Activated on 12 July 2007

=== Assignments ===
- 6950th Security Group, 1 July 1974 – 1 Oct 1978
- United States Air Force Security Service (later Electronic Security Command), 1 October 1978
- Electronic Security, Europe (later European Electronic Security Division), 30 September 1980
- 693d Electronic Security Wing, 7 July 1988
- European Electronic Security Division, 23 May 1991
- 26th Intelligence Wing, 1 October 1991
- 26th Intelligence Group, 1 October 1993 – 30 June 1995
- 693d Intelligence Group (later 693d intelligence, Surveillance and Reconnaissance Group), 12 July 2007 – present

=== Stations ===
- RAF Chicksands, England, 1 July 1974 – 30 June 1995
- Ramstein Air Base, Germany, 12 July 2007 – present

=== Awards ===
| Award streamer | Award | Dates | Notes |
|---|---|---|---|
| | Air Force Meritorious Unit Award | 1 June 2014 – 31 May 2015 | 450th Intelligence Squadron |
| | Air Force Meritorious Unit Award | 1 June 2015 – 31 May 2016 | 450th Intelligence Squadron |
| | Air Force Outstanding Unit Award | 1 July 1980 – 30 June 1982 | 6950th Security Squadron |
| | Air Force Outstanding Unit Award | 1 July 1987 – 30 June 1989 | 6950th Electronic Security Group |
| | Air Force Outstanding Unit Award | 1 October 1993–30 September 1994 | 450th Intelligence Squadron |
| | Air Force Outstanding Unit Award | 1 June 2006 – 31 December 2007 | 450th Intelligence Squadron |
| | Air Force Outstanding Unit Award | 1 January 2008 – 31 December 2009 | 450th Intelligence Squadron |
| | Air Force Outstanding Unit Award | 1 June 2009 – 31 December 2011 | 450th Intelligence Squadron |
