= 500th Air Defense Group =

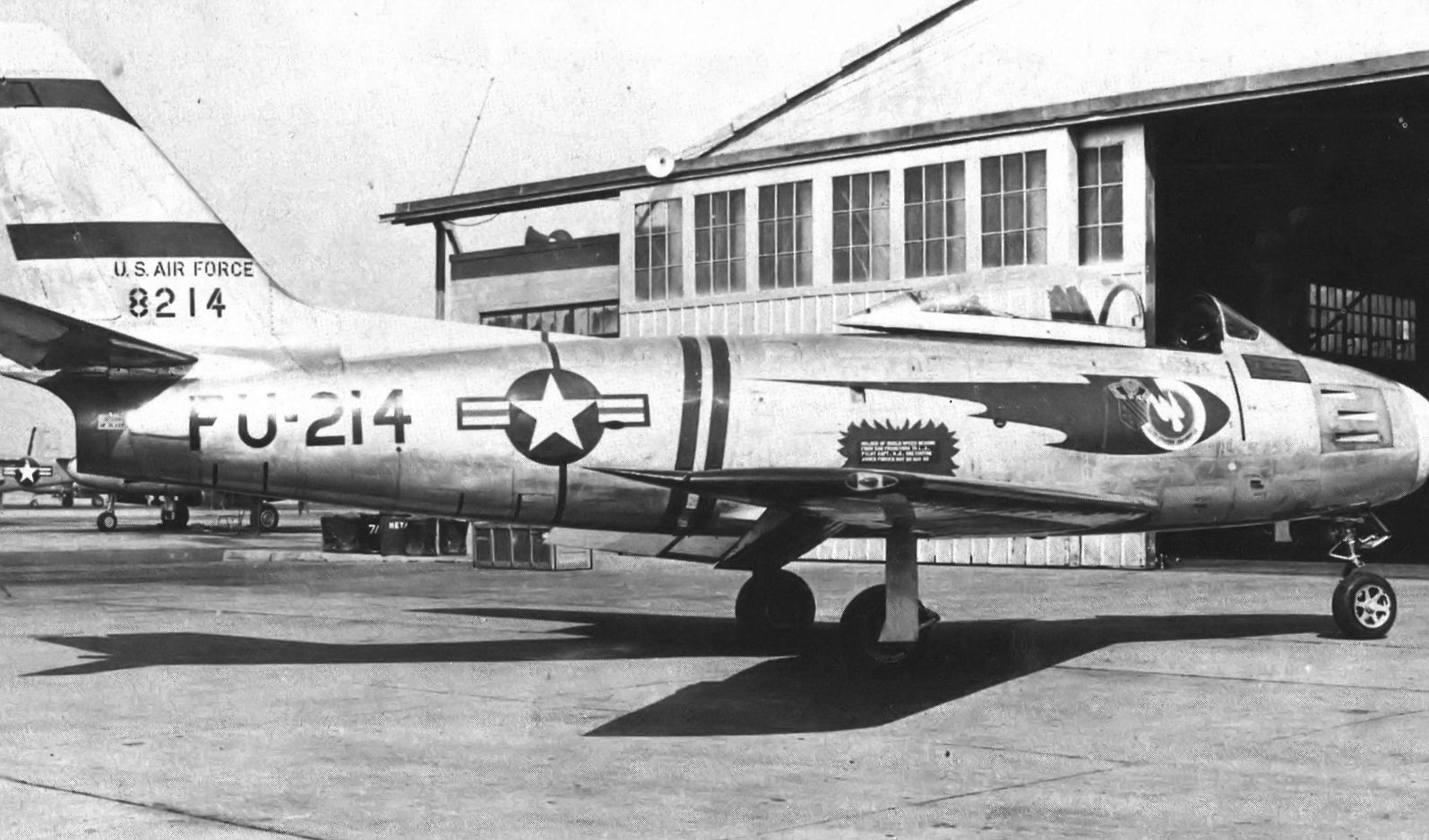
- 71st Fighter-Interceptor Squadron F-86A Sabre (Note: Aircraft is North American F-86A-5-NA Sabre, serial 48-214. On 20 May 1950, this plane set a world speed record. It was transferred to the Air National Guard in 1954, and to the Military Aircraft Storage and Disposal Center and scrapped in 1958. Baugher, Joe (19 January 2023). "1946-1948 USAF Serial Numbers". Joe Baugher. At the time the picture was taken in 1950, the 71st Squadron was still assigned to another group.)
- Active: 1945–1946; 1947; 1953–1955
- Country: United States
- Branch: United States Air Force
- Type: Fighter Interceptor
- Role: Air defense

The 500th Air Defense Group is a disbanded United States Air Force (USAF) organization. Its last assignment was with the 4708th Air Defense Wing at Greater Pittsburgh Airport, Pennsylvania. It was last active on 18 August 1955.

The group was originally activated as a support group at the end of World War II and provided logistics and administrative support for the 67th Tactical Reconnaissance Group in Germany and the United States until 1946, when the two groups were inactivated. The groups were activated again in 1947, but the 500th was soon discontinued when the USAF reorganized its combat and support units in the wing base reorganization in which a single wing was responsible for a base.

The group was activated once again in 1953, when ADC established it as the headquarters for a dispersed fighter-interceptor squadron and the medical, maintenance, and administrative squadrons supporting it. It was replaced in 1955 when ADC transferred its mission, equipment, and personnel to the 54th Fighter Group in a project that replaced air defense groups commanding fighter squadrons with fighter groups with distinguished records during World War II.

== History ==
=== World War II ===
The group was activated as the 500th Air Service Group shortly after V-E Day in a reorganization of Army Air Forces (AAF) support groups in which the AAF replaced Service Groups that included personnel from other branches of the Army and supported two combat groups with Air Service Groups including only Air Corps units. It was designed to support a single combat group. Its 918th Air Engineering Squadron provided maintenance that was beyond the capability of the combat group, its 742nd Air Materiel Squadron handled all supply matters, and its Headquarters & Base Services Squadron provided other support. It supported 67th Tactical Reconnaissance Group in Germany and then returned to the US, where both groups were inactivated.

=== Cold War ===
When the 67th Tactical Reconnaissance Group was reactivated in 1947, the 500th Air Service Group once again activated to support it. The 500th was inactivated and replaced by 67th Airdrome Group, 67th Station Medical Group, and 67th Maintenance & Supply Group in the experimental Wing Base reorganization of 1947 (Hobson Plan), which was designed to unify control at air bases The group was disbanded in 1948.

The group was reconstituted, redesignated as the 500th Air Defense Group, and activated at Greater Pittsburgh Airport on 18 February 1953 with responsibility for air defense of Western Pennsylvania. It was assigned the 71st Fighter-Interceptor Squadron, which was already stationed at Greater Pittsburgh Airport, and flying North American F-86 Sabres, as its operational component. The 71st had been assigned directly to the 4708th Defense Wing. The group also replaced the 81st Air Base Squadron as host organization for USAF portion of Greater Pittsburgh Airport. The group was assigned three squadrons to perform its support responsibilities. The group was inactivated and replaced by 54th Fighter-Interceptor Group in 1955 as part of ADC's Project Arrow, which was designed to bring back on the active list the fighter units which had compiled memorable records in the two world wars. The group was disbanded once again in 1984.

== Lineage ==
- Constituted as the 500th Air Service Group on 16 December 1944

Activated on 1 June 1945
Inactivated on 31 March 1946
Activated on 25 July 1947
Inactivated on 25 November 1947
Disbanded on 8 October 1948

- Reconstituted and redesignated 500th Air Defense Group on 21 January 1953

Activated on 16 February 1953
Inactivated on 18 August 1955
Disbanded on 27 September 1984

=== Assignments ===
- Unknown 1945 – March 1946, (probably IX Air Force Service Command – September 1945, Third Air Force – January 1946, First Air Force – March 1946)
- Tactical Air Command, March 1946 – 31 March 1946
- Twelfth Air Force, 25 July 1947 – 15 November 1947
- 4708th Defense Wing (later 4708th Air Defense Wing), 16 February 1953 – 18 August 1955

=== Stations ===
- Haguenau Airfield, France, 1 June 1945
- Drew Field, Florida, 16 September 1945
- MacDill Field, Florida, 21 December 1945

- Shaw Field, South Carolina, February 1946 – 31 March 1946
- March Field, California, 25 July 1947 – 15 November 1947
- Greater Pittsburgh Airport, Pennsylvania, 16 February 1953 – 18 August 1955

=== Components ===
- 71st Fighter-Interceptor Squadron, 16 February 1953 – 18 August 1955
- 500th Air Base Squadron, 16 February 1953 – 18 August 1955
- 500th Materiel Squadron, 16 February 1953 – 18 August 1955
- 500th Medical Squadron (later 500th USAF Infirmary, 500th USAF Dispensary), 16 February 1953 – 18 August 1955
- 742nd Air Materiel Squadron 1 June 1945 – 31 March 1946, 25 July 1947 – 15 November 1947
- 918th Air Engineering Squadron 1 June 1945 – 31 March 1946, 25 July 1947 – 15 November 1957

=== Aircraft ===
- North American F-86A Sabre, 1953–1955

== See also ==
- List of United States Air Force Aerospace Defense Command Interceptor Squadrons
- List of F-86 Sabre units
