= 67th Cyberspace Operations Group =

67th Cyberspace Operations Group

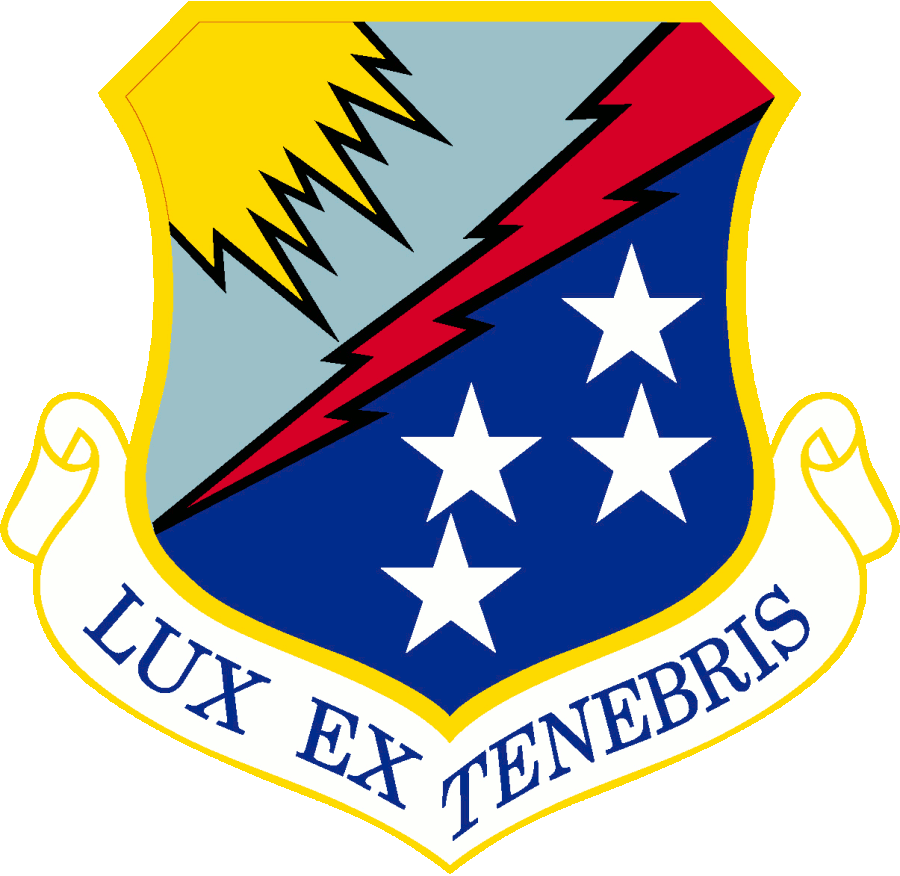
- 67th Cyberspace Operations Group emblem (Note: The group uses the 67th Wing emblem with the group designation on the scroll. Lacoma, Factsheet 67 Cyberspace Operations Group.)
- Active: 1941–1946; 1947–1949; 1951–1957; 1993–present
- Country: United States
- Branch: United States Air Force
- Role: Information Operations
- Part of: Air Combat Command
- Garrison/HQ: Kelly Field Annex
- Motto: Lux Ex Tenebris Latin Light from Darkness
- Engagements: European Theater of Operations; Korean War
- Decorations: Distinguished Unit Citation; Air Force Outstanding Unit Award with Combat "V" Device; Air Force Outstanding Unit Award; Belgian Fourragère; Republic of Korea Presidential Unit Citation

The 67th Cyberspace Operations Group is a unit of the 67th Cyberspace Wing. Headquartered on Kelly Field Annex's Security Hill, the group is an Air Force information operations unit.

The group was first organized during World War II as the 67th Observation Group and saw combat with Eighth and Ninth Air Forces in the European Theater of Operations. It was deployed for 36 months overseas and 18 months of combat action. The group performed tactical reconnaissance during the D-Day invasion of Europe and the campaign against Germany. For its World War II operations, the group earned the Distinguished Unit Citation, two foreign decorations, and the Belgian Fourragère.

== Mission ==
The 67th COG is the principal Air Force group conducting Offensive Cyber Operations (OCO) to "Engage the Enemy." Provides forces to conduct Air Force computer network operations for United States Strategic Command, United States Cyber Command and other combatant commands. The group conducts computer network operations and warfare planning for the Air Force, joint task forces and combatant commanders. The group also conducts Secretary of Defense-directed special network warfare missions.

== History ==
For related history, see 67th Cyberspace Wing

=== World War II ===
Flew antisubmarine patrols along the east coast of the US after the Japanese attacked Pearl Harbor. Began training in January 1942 for duty overseas. Operational squadrons were the 12th, 107th, 109th, and 153d Observation Squadrons.

Moved to the European theater, August–October 1942. Assigned first to Eighth and later (October 1943) to Ninth Air Force. At RAF Membury, the group received well-used Supermarine Spitfire Vs and early Douglas A-20 Havoc and Boston aircraft from the RAF plus a few L-4B Grasshopper observation aircraft to train with until their Lockheed F-5/P-38 Lightning aircraft arrived from the United States. The 67th Group operated as the nucleus of the USAAF tactical reconnaissance organization in the UK, a task acknowledged by the redesignation as such soon after the Membury units were transferred to the Ninth Air Force in October 1943. At the time of the transfer to Ninth Air Force, the group was redesignated the 67th Reconnaissance Group.

At the time, the 107th and 109th Squadrons were converting to North American P-51 Mustangs. However, before this was completed, the 107th Squadron was moved to RAF Aldermaston and the 109th to RAF Middle Wallop so that their reconnaissance photographs and visual intelligence would be quickly available to IX Troop Carrier Command and IX Fighter Command Headquarters based there.

The group received a DUC for operations along the coast of France, 15 February – 20 March 1944, when the group flew at low altitude in the face of intense flak to obtain photographs that aided the invasion of the Continent. Flew weather missions, made visual reconnaissance for ground forces, and photographed enemy positions to support the Normandy campaign and later to assist First Army and other Allied forces in the drive to Germany. Took part in the offensive against the Siegfried Line, September–December 1944, and in the Battle of the Bulge, December 1944 – January 1945. From January to May 1945, photographed dams on the Roer River in preparation for the ground offensive to cross the river, and aided the Allied assault across the Rhine and into Germany.

Returned to the US, July–September 1945. Inactivated on 31 March 1946.

=== Postwar era ===
The group was activated as part of a service-wide, wing-base test on 19 May 1947 by Tactical Air Command. Assigned to Ninth Air Force. Formed at Shaw Field, South Carolina and equipped with RB-26's and RF-80's. Moved to Langley AFB Virginia, as photo-reconnaissance organization. Reassigned to Twelfth Air Force and moved to March AFB, California. Budget constraints, though, resulted in the wing's inactivation on 28 March 1949.

=== Korean War ===
The need for tactical reconnaissance resources became obvious when North Korea launched a surprise attack against the Republic of Korea in June 1950. In February 1951, Headquarters Far East Air Forces activated the 67th Tactical Reconnaissance Group at Komaki Air Base, Japan replacing the inactivated 543rd Tactical Support Group.

Used RB-26, RF-80, RF-86, and RF-84 aircraft. Made photographic reconnaissance of front lines, enemy positions, and installations; took pre-strike and bomb-damage assessment photographs; made visual reconnaissance of enemy artillery and naval gun positions; and flew weather missions. Received an AFOUA for the period 1 December 1952 – 30 April 1953 when, in the face of enemy opposition and adverse weather, the group performed reconnaissance missions on a 24-hour-a-day, 7-day-a¬week basis to provide valuable intelligence for UN forces.

After the Korean armistice, reassigned to Japan in December 1954. Performed various reconnaissance as needed. Inactivated on 1 October 1957 when parent wing adopted Tri-Deputate organization and assigned all flying components directly to wing.

=== Cyberspace operations ===
Reactivated October 1991 when parent wing implemented Objective Wing organization. Ended flying operations in August 1992. Between 1993 and 2000, mission included directing planning of all-source intelligence, electronic combat, and security support for the Air Intelligence Agency. Since 2000, collected and analyzed intelligence and provided it to war-fighters, national decision-makers, and the test and acquisition community.

== Lineage ==
- Constituted as the 67th Observation Group on 21 August 1941

Activated on 1 September 1941
Redesignated 67th Reconnaissance Group in May 1943
Redesignated 67th Tactical Reconnaissance Group in November 1943
Redesignated 67th Reconnaissance Group on 15 June 1945
Inactivated on 31 March 1946

- Activated on 19 May 1947

Redesignated 67th Tactical Reconnaissance Group on 22 August 1948
Inactivated on 28 March 1949

- Activated on 25 February 1951

Inactivated on 1 October 1957

- Redesignated 67th Intelligence Group and activated on 1 October 1993

Redesignated 67th Information Operations Group on 1 August 2000
Redesignated 67th Network Warfare Group on 5 July 2006
Redesignated 67th Cyberspace Operations Group on 1 October 2013

=== Assignments ===
- 3d Air Support Command, 1 September 1941
- 5th Air Support Command, 29 March 1942
- III Ground Air Support Command, 15 May 1942
- VIII Ground Air Support Command, 23 June 1942
- III Ground Air Support Command, 4 July 1942
- Third Air Force, 21 August 1942
- VIII Fighter Command, 5 September 1942
- IX Fighter Command, November 1943
- IX Air Support Command (later IX Tactical Air Command), February 1944 (Note: Lacoma lists these as separate units. But see Maurer, Combat Units, p. 448 (IX Air Support Command redesignated IX Tactical Air Command in April 1944).)
- Third Air Force, 19 September 1945
- First Air Force, 21 January–31 March 1946
- Tactical Air Command, 19 May 1947
- Twelfth Air Force, 25 July 1947
- 1st Fighter Wing, 15 August 1947
- 67th Reconnaissance Wing (later 67th Tactical Reconnaissance Wing), 25 November 1947 – 28 March 1949
- 67th Tactical Reconnaissance Wing, 25 February 1951 – 1 October 1957 (attached to 6102d Air Base Wing after 1 July 1957)
- 67 Intelligence Wing (later 67 Information Operations Wing, 67 Network Warfare Wing, 67 Cyberspace Wing), 1 October 1993 – present

=== Stations ===
- Esler Field, Louisiana, 1 September 1941
- Charleston Army Air Field, South Carolina, December 1941
- Esler Field, Louisiana, January–August 1942
- RAF Membury (AAF-466), England, September 1942
- RAF Middle Wallop (AAF-449), England, December 1943
- Le Molay Airfield (A-9), France, July 1944
- Toussus le Noble Airfield (A-46), France, August 1944
- Charleroi Airfield (A-87), Belgium, September 1944
- Vogelsang Airfield (Y-51), Germany, March 1945
- Limburg Airfield (Y-83), Germany, c. 2 April 1945
- Eschwege Airfield (R-11), Germany, c. 10 April–July 1945
- Drew Field, Florida, c. September 1945
- MacDill Field, Florida, December 1945
- Shaw Field, South Carolina, February-31 March 1946
- Langley Field, Virginia, 19 May 1947
- March Field, California, c. 25 July 1947 – 28 March 1949
- Komaki Air Base, Japan, 25 February 1951
- Taegu Air Base (K-2), South Korea, 21 March 1951
- Kimpo Air Base (K-14), South Korea, 20 August 1951
- Itami Air Base, Japan,6 December 1954
- Yokota Air Base, Japan, 1 July 1957 – 1 October 1957
- Kelly Air Force Base (later Kelly Field Annex, Joint Base San Antonio-Lackland), Texas, 1 October 1993 – present

=== Components ===
- 11th Reconnaissance Squadron (later 11th Tactical Reconnaissance Squadron): 28–31 March 1946, 19 May 1947 – 28 March 1949; 18 September 1953 – 1 October 1957 (attached to 67th Tactical Reconnaissance Wing 1 June–24 November 1954 and after 1 July 1957)
- 12th Reconnaissance Squadron (later 12th Tactical Reconnaissance Squadron): 29 March 1942 – 13 June 1944 (attached until c. 11 August 1944) 24 July 1947 – 28 March 1949, 25 February 1951 – 1 October 1957 (attached to 67th Tactical Reconnaissance Wing 1 June–24 November 1954 and after 1 July 1957)
- 15th Reconnaissance Squadron: (Note: Not related to the next unit, this squadron was originally the 15th Observation Squadron. Maurer, Combat Squadrons, pp. 85-87.) 22 Dec 1943 – 4 January 1944; 4 January 1944 – 13 June 1944 (attached until 27 June 1944), 25 February 1951 – 1 October 1957 (attached to 67th Tactical Reconnaissance Wing 1 June–24 November 1954 and after 1 July 1957)
- 15th Reconnaissance Squadron: (Note: Not related to the previous unit, this squadron was originally the 15th Photographic Mapping Squadron. Maurer, Combat Squadrons, pp. 84-85.) 19 May–24 July 1947
- 30th Photographic Reconnaissance Squadron: attached 9 June 1944, assigned 13 June 1944 – 7 November 1945
- 33d Photographic Reconnaissance Squadron: assigned 13 June–7 October 1944 (attached to 10th Photographic Reconnaissance Group until 11 August 1944), attached until 2 November 1944; assigned 17 May–c. 5 July 1945.
- 45th Reconnaissance Squadron (later 45th Tactical Reconnaissance Squadron): see 155th Photographic Reconnaissance Squadron
- 107th Observation Squadron (later 107th Reconnaissance Squadron): 1 September 1941 – 9 November 1945
- 109th Observation Squadron (later 109th Reconnaissance Squadron): 1 September 1941 – 9 November 1945
- 113th Observation Squadron (later 113th Reconnaissance Squadron): 1 September 1941 – 12 March 1942 (attached to 69th Observation Group 12 December 1941 – 20 January 1942)
- 153d Observation Squadron (later 153d Liaison Squadron): 1 September 1941 – 12 December 1943
- 155th Photographic Reconnaissance Squadron (later 45th Reconnaissance Squadron, 45 Tactical Reconnaissance Squadron): 21 February–23 May 1945 (attached to 9th Tactical Reconnaissance Group (Provisional) after 25 April 1945), 25 February 1951 – 1 October 1957 (attached to 67th Tactical Reconnaissance Wing 1 June–24 November 1954 and after 1 July 1957)
- 161st Tactical Reconnaissance Squadron: 3 July–9 November 1945
- 305th Cyberspace Operations Squadron
- 390th Cyberspace Operations Squadron
- 352d Information Operations Squadron (later 352d Network Warfare Squadron, 352d Cyberspace Operations Squadron): 1 October 2004 – 18 August 2009, 1 December 2014 – present
- 91st Cyberspace Operations Squadron

=== Aircraft ===
- Various observation, 1941–1942
- F-4/P-38 Lightning, 1942–1945
- F-6/P-51 Mustang, 1942–1945
- RB-26 Invader, 1947–1949; 1951–1957
- RF-80 Shooting Star, 1947–1949; 1951–1957
- RF-86 Sabre, 1951–1957
- RF-84 Thunderstreak, 1951–1957
- RF-4C Phantom II, 1991–1992

== See also ==
- 500th Air Service Group (support unit for 67th TRG from 1945-1947)
- List of cyber warfare forces
