= Vogelsang Airfield =

Former German military airfield

Vogelsang Airfield Advanced Landing Ground (ALG) Y-51 Fliegerhorst Vogelsang

- North Rhine-Westphalia, Germany Vogelsang Airfield (Germany)

Site information
- Type: Military airfield
- Controlled by: United States Army Air Forces

Location
- Coordinates: 50°33′53″N 006°26′16″E

Site history
- Built: 1935
- Built by: Luftwaffe
- In use: 1935–1945 (Luftwaffe); March–July 1945 (USAAF)
- Materials: Turf/Pierced Steel Planking (PSP)

Vogelsang Airfield (Fliegerhorst Vogelsang) is an abandoned World War II military airfield located approximately 3 miles northwest of Schleiden (Nordrhein-Westfalen); approximately 330 miles southwest of Berlin.

The airfield is a part of the former Ordensburg Vogelsang military training area.

== History ==
The airfield was built as part of the Nazi Party estate about 1935 for light courier aircraft operations. It was likely a grass airfield with a small aircraft parking area and possibly a hangar and a station building.

In May 1940, as part of the buildup in western Germany prior to the Battle of France, the Luftwaffe stationed Kampfgeschwader 76 (KG 76) with Dornier Do 17Z light bombers, and Jagdgeschwader 3 and 21 (JG 3, JG 21) with Messerschmitt Bf 109E fighters at the airfield. All of these units moved into Belgium shortly after the invasion on 10 May. Vogelsang was not used again by combat aircraft until 1945.

In late February 1945, as a result of the Western Allied invasion of Germany, United States Army forces moved through the Eifel area and captured the airfield about 1 March. On 8 March the IX Engineer Command 816th Engineer Aviation Battalion moved in and began to construct an operational airfield for Allied aircraft. The engineers laid down a 3600' Pierced Steel Planking runway aligned 15/33 on the former Luftwaffe field to support all-weather operations on the site. On 23 March the airfield was designated as Advanced Landing Ground "Y-51 Vogelsang".

Its operational use by the USAAF was by the Ninth Air Force 67th Tactical Reconnaissance Group, which operated various photo-reconnaissance aircraft (P-38, P-51) from the airfield taking reconnaissance photos west of the Ludendorff Bridge supporting the advancing Ninth Army to close the Ruhr Pocket until the end of April 1945 when it moved into Central Germany. After the combat units moved out, the airfield remained open, supporting the Occupation forces in the area with transport supply flights until being closed on 10 July 1945.

The airport and the Vogelsang estate were turned over to Belgian military authorities in 1945, and was used as a NATO military training area until 2006. The USAAF airfield was dismantled and there is little evidence of the wartime airfield today.

== See also ==
- Advanced Landing Ground
