= 693rd Intelligence, Surveillance and Reconnaissance Group =

693rd Intelligence, Surveillance and Reconnaissance Group
- Active: 1988–1991; 1991–1993; 2007–present
- Country: United States
- Branch: United States Air Force
- Role: Intelligence
- Part of: Air Combat Command: Sixteenth Air Force; 480th Intelligence, Surveillance and Reconnaissance Wing
- Garrison/HQ: Ramstein Air Base, Germany
- Decorations: Air Force Outstanding Unit Award

Insignia
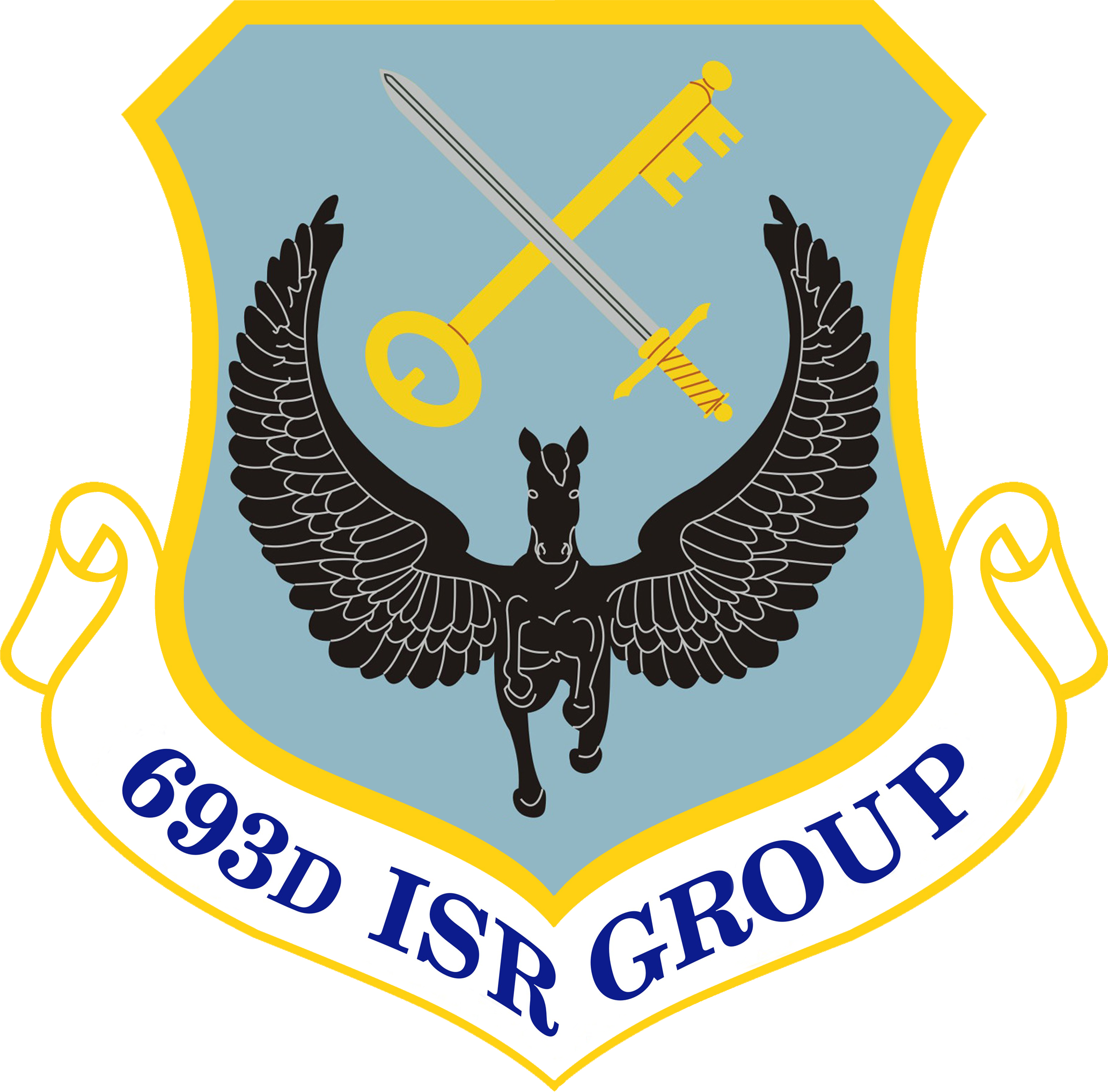
- 693rd Intelligence, Surveillance and Reconnaissance Group emblem (approved 30 August 2007)

The United States Air Force's 693rd Intelligence, Surveillance and Reconnaissance Group is an intelligence unit located at Ramstein Air Base, Germany.

== Mission ==
The mission of the 693rd Intelligence, Surveillance and Reconnaissance Group is to lead theater Air Force ISR operations through effective planning, collection, analysis, and dissemination, enabling theater and national warfighters to secure global vigilance, reach, and power.

== Lineage ==
- Established as the 693rd Electronic Security Wing on 21 June 1988

Activated on 7 July 1988
Inactivated on 1 October 1991

- Redesignated 693 Intelligence Wing and activated on 1 October 1991

Inactivated on 1 October 1993

- Redesignated 693 Intelligence Group on 21 June 2007

Activated on 12 July 2007
Redesignated 693 Intelligence, Surveillance, and Reconnaissance Group on 1 January 2009

=== Assignments ===
- European Electronic Security Division 7 July 1988
- Air Force Intelligence Command, 1 October 1991 – 1 October 1993
- 70th Intelligence Wing, 12 July 2007
- 480th Intelligence Wing (later 480th intelligence, Surveillance and Reconnaissance Wing), 23 July 2008 – present

=== Components ===
Groups

- 6950th Electronic Security Group (later 450th Intelligence Squadron), 7 July 1988 – 23 July 1991, 12 July 2007 – present
- 6960th Electronic Security Group, c. 1 October 1991 – c. 1 October 1993

Squadrons

- 24th Intelligence Squadron, 1 April 2008 – present
- 402nd Intelligence Squadron, 1 October 2011 – present

Darmstadt, Germany (Note: Components are stationed with group headquarters, except as noted.)

- 450th Intelligence Squadron (see 6950th Electronic Security Group)
- 485th Intelligence Squadron, 12 July 2007 – present

Mainz-Kastel, Germany

- 600th Electronic Security Squadron, 27 August 1992 – 1 October 1993

Langley Air Force Base, Virginia

- 693rd Intelligence Support Squadron, 1 June 2010 – present
- 6906th Electronic Security Squadron, 1 October 1991 – 1 October 1993

Brooks Air Force Base, Panama

- 6933rd Electronic Security Squadron, 1 October 1991 – 1 October 1993

Howard Air Force Base, Panama

- 6947th Electronic Security Squadron, 1 October 1991 – 1 October 1993

Naval Air Station Key West, Florida

- 6948th Electronic Security Squadron, 1 October 1991 – 1 October 1993
- 6949th Electronic Security Squadron, 1 October 1991 – 1 October 1993

Offutt Air Force Base, Nebraska

- 6951st Electronic Security Squadron, 1 May 1991 – 1 October 1991

RAF Harrogate, England

- 6952nd Electronic Security Squadron, c. 1 May 1991 – c. 1 October 1991

RAF Lakenheath, England

- Electronic Security Squadron, Provisional, 6975th, attached c. 1 May 1991 – c. 1 October 1991

Prince Sultan Air Base, Saudi Arabia

- 6993rd Electronic Security Squadron, 1 October 1991 – 1 October 1993

=== Stations ===
- RAF Chicksands, United Kingdom, 7 July 1988
- Kelly Air Force Base, Texas, 1 October 1991 – 1 October 1993
- Ramstein Air Base, Germany, 12 July 2007 – present

=== Awards ===
Award streamer	Award	Dates	Notes
	Air Force Outstanding Unit Award	1 January 1990-31 December 1991	693rd Electronic Security Wing
	Air Force Outstanding Unit Award	1 June 2006 – 31 December 2007	693rd Intelligence Group
