= Limburg Airfield =

Abandoned WWII military airfield in Germany

Limburg Airfield (Y-83) Fliegerhorst Limburg

- Hesse, Germany Limburg Airfield (Germany)

Site information
- Type: Military airfield

Location
- Coordinates: 50°24′50″N 008°04′16″E

Site history
- Built: 1944
- Built by: Luftwaffe
- In use: 1944-1945 (Luftwaffe); 1945 (USAAF)
- Materials: SOD

Limburg Airfield is an abandoned World War II military airfield located in Germany approximately 2 miles north-northwest of Limburg an der Lahn (Hessen); approximately 275 miles southwest of Berlin.

The airfield was built by the Luftwaffe in 1944 to protect the Limburg railroad marshalling yards from aerial attack by Eighth Air Force heavy bombers. It was captured in late March 1945 by American forces, one of the first airfields to be taken by the Americans east of the Rhine River. It was also the location of the first American wartime radio broadcast east of the Rhine. Once operational, Limburg was used as a reconnaissance airfield by Ninth Air Force and later as a combat resupply and casualty evacuation airfield until the end of the war.

== History ==
The airfield was laid out by the Luftwaffe in the summer of 1944 as a grass airfield, midway between Limburg and Dehrn, just to the east of the Rhine River in an agricultural area. Jagdgeschwader 3 (JG 3) moved in about 1 September with Messerschmitt Bf 109G day interceptors to halt in the defense of the Limburg railroad yards, a critical transportation point in Western Germany. Several Luftwaffe FlaK units were stationed in the area as well as the airfield. Besides the interceptors, Fliegerhorst Limburg was used by Aufklärungsgruppe 12 (AG 12); a Junkers Ju 88 day reconnaissance unit and Nahaufklärungsgruppe 1 (NG 1), a night Ju 88 reconnaissance unit.

The United States Army Air Forces Eighth Air Force attacked the marshalling yards on 25 March and 31 March 1945, heavily damaging the facility. The railroad yards were also attacked by Ninth Air Force Martin B-26 Marauder medium bombers several times during March. In June 2019, an explosion created a crater 33 ft (10 m) wide and 14 ft (4.3 m) deep in a cornfield near the village of Ahlbach. Bomb disposal experts believe it was caused by a detonator decomposing on an unexploded 500 lb (230 kg) AN-M64 General-Purpose Bomb that was mostly likely dropped in the area during the Allied bombing raids in March 1945.

United States Army units began moving into the Limburg area in late March 1945, and ground forces captured Limburg Airfield and its facilities about 26 March. IX Engineering Command 816th Engineer Aviation Battalion moved in to de-mine the facility and clear out wrecked German aircraft. On 30 March the airfield was declared operationally ready for aircraft and designated as Advanced Landing Ground "Y-83 Limburg". On 2 April the National Broadcasting Company's commentator Lowell Thomas was flown to the airfield, making a news report from the captured airfield, one of the first operational USAAF airfields East of the Rhine.

Quickly, the Ninth Air Force 67th Tactical Reconnaissance Group arrived at Limburg with a variety of reconnaissance aircraft, remaining for about a week until moving east into Central Germany. C-47 Skytrain transports then used the airfield until the end of the war on Combat resupply and casualty evacuation (S&E) flights. until the end of the war in May.

Limburg Airfield was closed and dismantled in June 1945. Since then, the airfield has been turned back into agricultural fields, and little remains of its existence.

== See also ==
- Advanced Landing Ground
