= Eschwege Airfield =

Eschwege Airfield (R-11) Fliegerhorst Eschwege

- Hesse, Germany Eschwege Airfield (Germany)

Site information
- Type: Military airfield

Location
- Coordinates: 51°11′55″N 010°01′27″E

Site history
- Built: 1937
- Built by: Luftwaffe
- In use: 1937-1945 (Luftwaffe); 1945-1946 (United States Army Air Forces)

Eschwege Airfield is a former military airfield located in Germany in the northwest part of Eschwege (Hessen); approximately 170 miles southwest of Berlin.

Fliegerhorst Eschwege was used during World War II by the German Luftwaffe as a transport and support airfield. It was seized in early April 1945 by the United States Army and used as a Ninth Air Force combat airfield until the end of the war in Europe. It was closed in January 1946 and was used as a displaced persons camp until 1949.

The airfield/camp was subsequently dismantled and the facility redeveloped into an industrial area.

== History ==
Eschwege was opened as a Luftwaffe airfield in 1937 as a Junkers Ju 52 transport airfield, with Kampfgeschwader 25 (KG 25) being formed at the airfield in April 1937. The airfield was used as a transport and support airfield throughout World War II, with numerous Luftwaffe ground units being formed there and then moved to combat assignments elsewhere.

The airfield was captured by United States Army forces in early April 1945. The IX Engineering Command 825th Engineering Aviation Brigade moved in about 6 April and cleared mines and other wreckage from the field, declaring it operationally ready for Allied combat aircraft on 7 April. It was designated as Advanced Landing Ground "R-11 Eschwege". The Ninth Air Force 67th Tactical Reconnaissance Group moved in on 10 April and remained until July, flying photo-reconnaissance missions from the airfield using a variety of aircraft.

After the end of the war, the airfield was turned over to Air Technical Service Command, and became a facility for the scrapping of captured Luftwaffe aircraft and other German military equipment. It was closed at the end of 1945.

It became a displaced persons (DP) camp in January 1946, housing approximately 1,770 Jews at the time of its opening. At its peak, on October 19, 1946, Eschwege housed roughly 3,355 Jews. The camp closed on April 26, 1949.

Today the site is an industrial area, with some of the original structures still remaining.

== See also ==
- Advanced Landing Ground
