= Le Molay Airfield =

Abandoned WWII military airfield

Le Molay Airfield Advanced Landing Ground (ALG) A-9/A-9D
- Calvados, Basse-Normandie Region, France
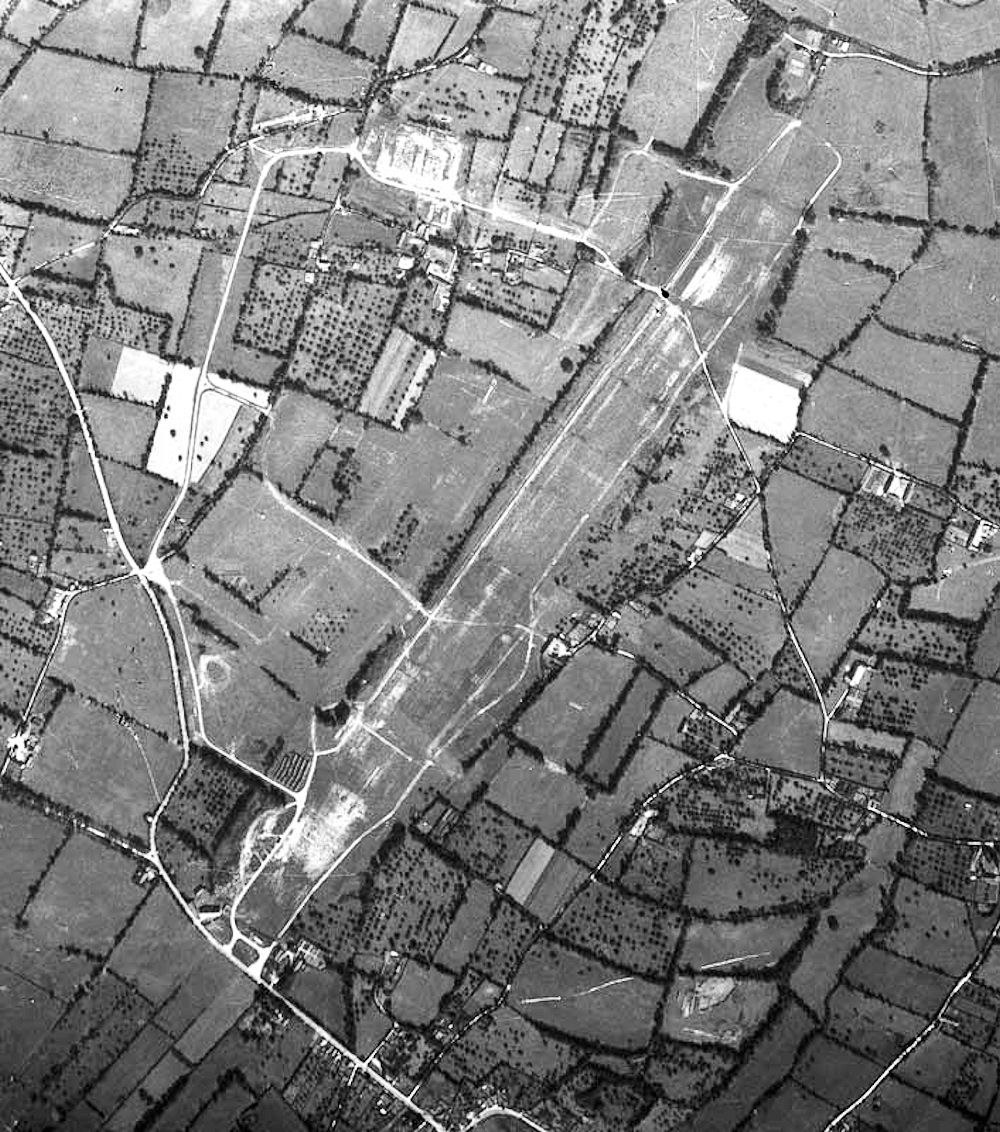
- Le Molay Airfield (A-9D) after dismantling by the IX Engineering Command

Site information
- Type: Military Airfield
- Controlled by: United States Army Air Forces

Location
- Coordinates: 49°15′30″N 000°53′06″W

Site history
- Built by: IX Engineering Command
- In use: June–September 1944
- Materials: Square-Mesh Track (SMT)
- Battles/wars: World War II - EAME Theater: Normandy Campaign; Northern France Campaign

Garrison information
- Garrison: Ninth Air Force
- Occupants: 67th Tactical Reconnaissance Group

Airfield information
Runways
Direction	Length and surface
04/22	4,000 feet (1,220 m) SMT/PSP
- One runway, 4 alert pads, 50 hardstands

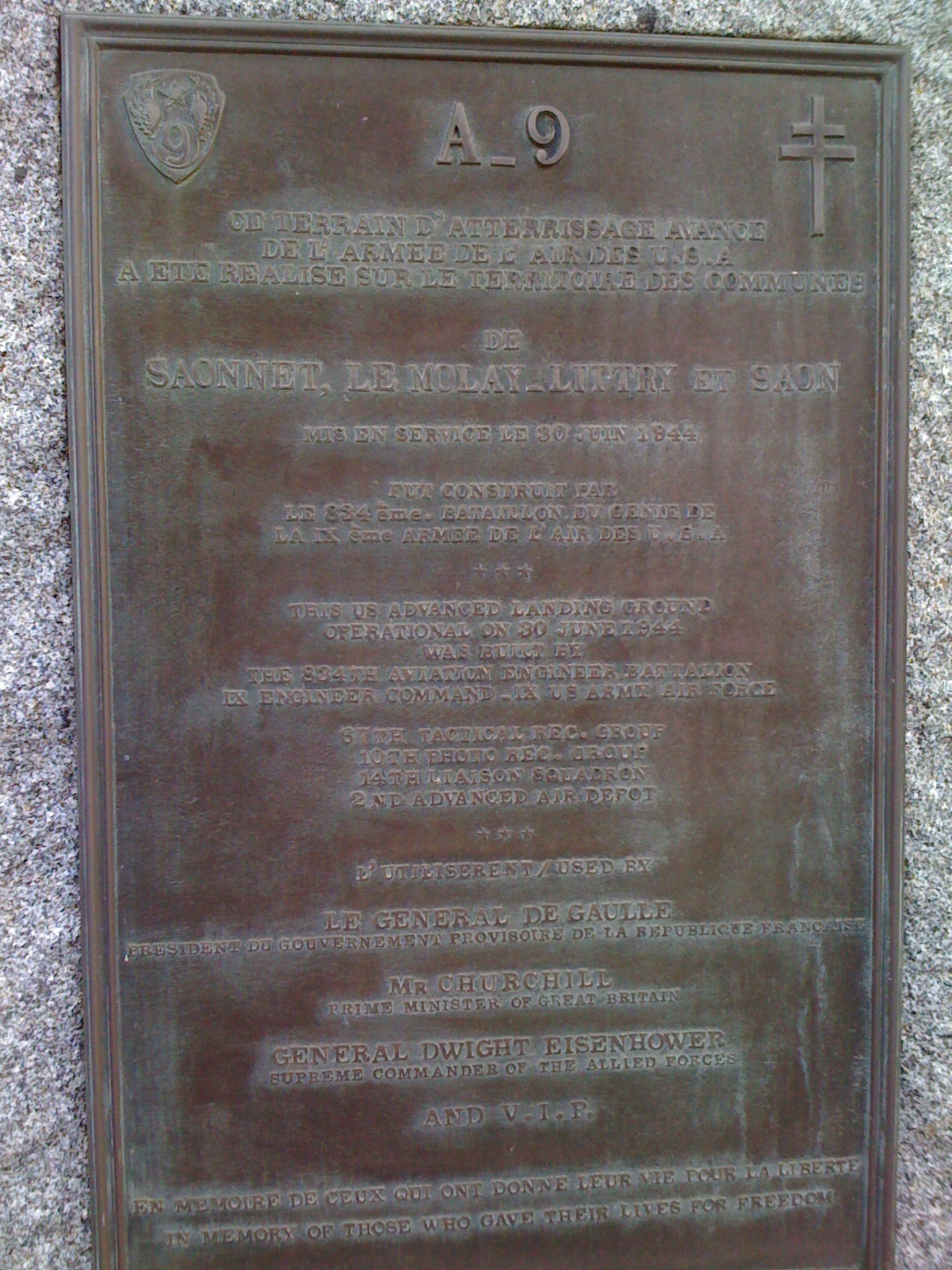
Le Molay Airfield Memorial, France

Le Molay Airfield is an abandoned World War II military airfield, which is located near the commune of Le Molay-Littry in the Normandy region of northern France.

Located approximately 2 miles (3.2 km) north of Le Molay-Littry, the United States Army Air Force established a temporary airfield after D-Day on 21 June 1944, shortly after the Allied landings in France The airfield was one of the first established in the liberated area of Normandy, constructed by the IX Engineering Command, 834th Engineer Aviation Battalion.

== History ==
Known as Advanced Landing Ground "A-9", the airfield consisted of a single Square-Mesh Track runway. Tents were used for billeting and for support facilities; an access road was built to the existing road infrastructure; a dump for supplies, ammunition, and gasoline drums, along with a drinkable water and minimal electrical grid for communications and station lighting.

The 67th Tactical Reconnaissance Group based F-4/P-38 Lightnings and F6/P-51 Mustang photo-reconnaissance aircraft at Le Molay from July though August 1944. The units based on A-9 were all reconnaissance units and this for two likely reasons. First the use of cameras, loading and retrieval of films and finally demanded their development know-how and equipment that were there, A 9 is a deposit. In addition, the 17th Signal Operation Battalion (communications and photographic service) had taken up residence on July 1 and must spend the photos taken by the Signal Service.

Also the fact that pictures taken to be operated quickly, the nearby headquarters of Montgomery assiduously frequented (too much for his taste) U.S. generals allowed an almost instantaneous operation of clichés. Finally the 67th TRG (Tactical Reconnaissance Group) was already based at Air Depot at Membury before his departure for France and A 9. The first aircraft arrived on July 2 but some confusion seemed to reign in first 15 days as before, Brereton and his General Staff had decided to redeploy a total overhaul and reconnaissance units of paramount importance in the preparation and conduct Overlord then in the course of the Battle of Normandy then, their role is to look around the weaknesses of the enemy.

After the Americans moved east into Central France with the advancing Allied Armies, the airfield was used for resupply and casualty evacuation by IX Air Force Service Command. It was re-designated Advanced Landing Ground A-9D, and became the Le Molay Air Depot, becoming the home of the 16th Air Depot Group. Le Molay became the home of a vast store of spare parts, and also a workshop for heavy repairs or aircraft. There were also general stores as well as providing aviation ground troops. Food and consumables, tools, fuel for land vehicles, machinery and engineering equipment service centers require as much as there were specialties.

After the Americans and British moved east into Central France with the advancing Allied Armies, the airfield was left un-garrisoned and used for resupply and casualty evacuation. It was closed on 5 October 1944 and the land returned to agricultural use.

== Major units assigned ==
- 67th Tactical Reconnaissance Group 1 July - 1 August 1944

30th (I6), 33d (SW) Photographic Reconnaissance Squadrons (F-4/P-38)
107th (AX), 109th (VX) Tactical Reconnaissance Squadrons (F-5/P-51)

== Current use ==
Today there is little or no physical evidence of the airfield's existence except for a faint disturbance on the landscape indicated at the coordinates listed, which may be the location of the runway. In addition, large numbers of possible wartime buildings of the ATSC 16th Air Depot Group seem to be in use as agricultural buildings in the general area.

A memorial to the men and units that were stationed at Le Molay Airfield. From the center of Molay-Littry, follow the D5 towards Bernesq, cross the Molay and reach the crossroads leading to Riboulet and Saonet. The stele is at this junction.

== See also ==
- Advanced Landing Ground
