= 55th Space Weather Squadron =

Inactive United States Air Force unit

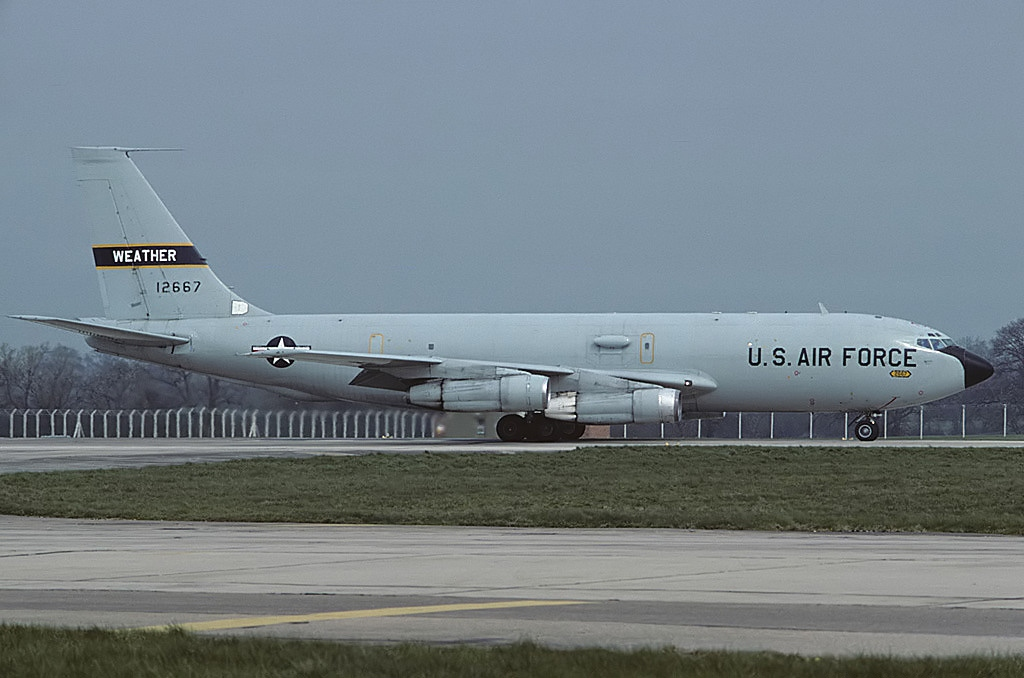
- Boeing WC-135B Constant Phoenix (Note: Aircraft is Boeing C-135-BN Stratolifter, serial 61-2667. It was converted to WC-135B configuration and later to WC-135W. It served under Project Constant Phoenix and was retired on 7 September 2022. Baugher, Joe (24 March 2023). "1961 USAF Serial Numbers". Joe Baugher.)
- Active: 1944–1947; 1951–1961; 1962–1993; 1997–2002
- Country: United States
- Branch: United States Air Force
- Role: Weather reconnaissance
- Nickname: Pole Vaulters
- Engagements: Western Pacific Theater
- Decorations: Army Meritorious Unit Commendation; Air Force Outstanding Unit Award

Insignia
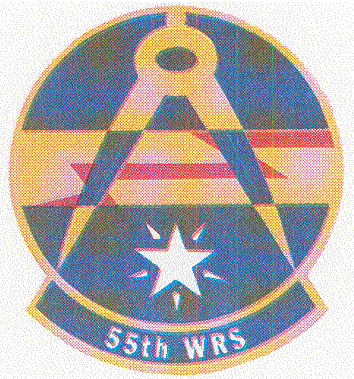
- 55th Weather Reconnaissance Squadron emblem (Note: Approved 3 July 1967. Significance: The blue field depicts the sky, the primary area of Air Force operations, and the global shape refers to the worldwide scope of the squadron's activities. The gold fess with red simulated lightning across the sphere symbolizes the earth's division into frigid, temperate, and torrid zones. The gold dividers counter-colored over the zones reflect the route, area weather data, and aerial atmospheric sampling obtained through photographic and visual reconnaissance. The five pointed star with five rays, while indicating the squadron's numerical designation, also symbolizes the squadron's awards – The Meritorious Unit Commendation earned during World War II and the unit's Air Force Outstanding Unit Awards. The emblem contains the national colors of red, white, and blue and the Air Force Colors of ultramarine blue and golden yellow.)

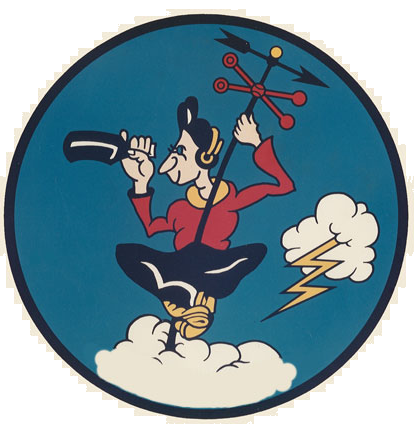
- 655th Bombardment Squadron emblem (Note: Approved 16 February 1945. Significance: Willie Weatherbee symbolizes the squadron's readiness to carry out its assigned task under all climactic conditions.)

The 55th Space Weather Squadron is an inactive United States Air Force unit. It was last assigned to the 50th Operations Group at Schriever Air Force Base, Colorado, where it was inactivated on 16 July 2002.

The squadron was first activated as the 655th Bombardment Squadron in 1944. After training in the United States, the squadron moved to the Pacific Theater in the spring of 1945, where, as the 55th Reconnaissance Squadron, it provided weather reconnaissance for Boeing B-29 Superfortress strategic bombing campaign against Japan. After V-J Day, the squadron returned to the United States and conducted weather reconnaissance until October 1947, when it was inactivated and its personnel and equipment transferred to another unit.

The squadron was reactivated at McClellan Air Force Base, California as the 55th Strategic Reconnaissance Squadron. Redesignated the 55th Weather Reconnaissance Squadron in 1954, the squadron flew weather reconnaissance missions until 1953, except for a brief inactive period in the early 1960s.

It was activated in 1997 under its most recent name, when it absorbed the resources of the 50th Weather Squadron, which had replaced the Air Force Space Forecast Center in 1994.

== History ==
=== World War II ===
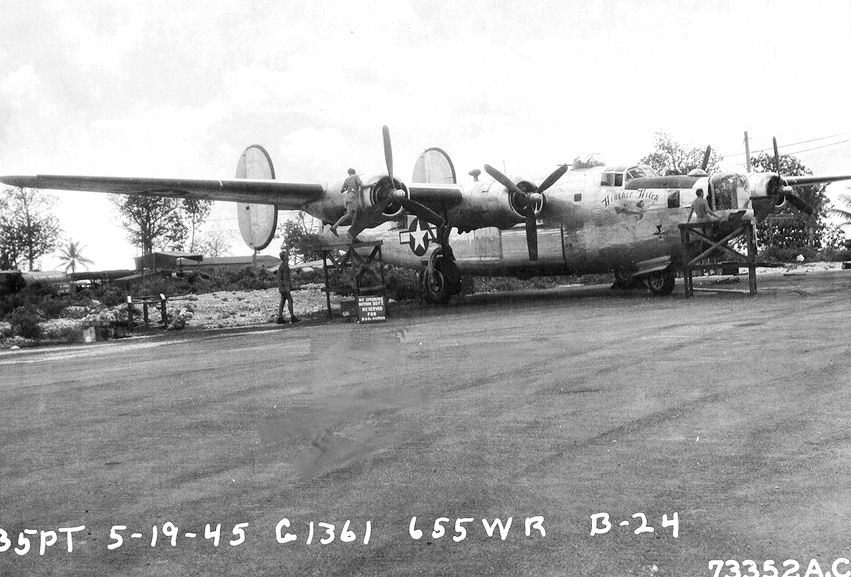
Squadron B-24L, Weather Witch, at Depot Field, Guam (Note: Aircraft is Ford built Consolidated B-24L-10-FO Liberator, serial 44-49506, Weather Wirch. Baugher, Joe (10 May 2023). "1944 USAF Serial Numbers". Joe Baugher. This plane was declared surplus on 30 November 1945. Photo taken on 19 May 1945.)

The squadron was first organized in August 1944 at Will Rogers Field, Oklahoma as the 655th Bombardment Squadron and equipped with Consolidated B-24 Liberator aircraft. It trained under Third Air Force until March 1945, when it deployed to Guam, where it was attached to XXI Bomber Command. From Guam, the squadron, now designated the 55th Reconnaissance Squadron, provided weather reconnaissance for Twentieth Air Force Boeing B-29 Superfortress raids on Japan in the Western Pacific theater.

=== Cold War weather reconnaissance operations ===
The squadron returned to the United States in March 1946 as an element of Air Weather Service, although it initially had no aircraft assigned and only a few personnel. In mid-July 1946, the squadron moved to Morrison Field, Florida, where the 1st Air Weather Group (Provisional) supervised the conversion of the 54th and 55th Squadrons to operate weather reconnaissance versions of the B-29 Superfortress over the next year. In June 1947, the squadron moved to Fairfield-Suisun Army Air Field, California, where it became responsible for weather reconnaissance operations in the United States. The following month, it began to fly daily missions over the eastern Pacific Ocean. The squadron inactivated in October 1947, transferring its personnel and equipment to the 374th Reconnaissance Squadron, which was simultaneously activated.

This action was, in essence, reversed in February 1951 when the squadron was reactivated as the 55th Strategic Reconnaissance Squadron, replacing the 374th Squadron, which had moved to McClellan Air Force Base, California. The squadron flew weather reconnaissance missions over the northern Pacific and parts of the Arctic Ocean, using WB-29s. It also supported nuclear weapons testing by monitoring radioactive clouds and taking atmospheric samples. In 1953, the squadron was assigned to the 9th Weather Group.

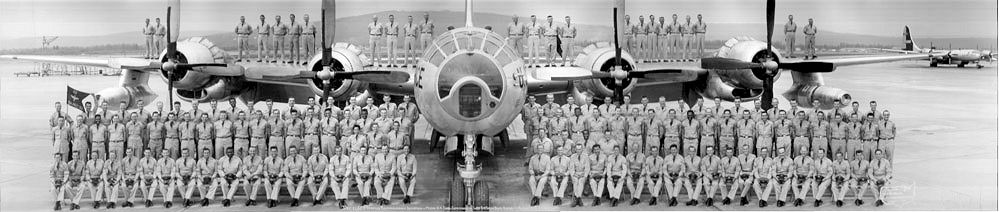
WB-50 and personnel of squadron Detachment 1 at Ladd AFB in 1958

The following year, the squadron upgraded to Boeing WB-50 Superfortresses. It tested WB-50 aircraft flying long-duration missions over 24 hours in length and trained crews for other weather squadrons. The same year, it was renamed the 55th Weather Reconnaissance Squadron. The 55th provided weather data for transoceanic fighter deployments, photographic reconnaissance for testing experimental Corona reconnaissance satellite imagery, and surveillance for space flight recoveries. In 1957 it added its first jet aircraft, the Boeing WB-47 Stratojet, to its inventory. The squadron added the northwestern Atlantic Ocean to its area of responsibility in the late 1950s. It tracked Hurricanes Dot and Donna in 1959 and 1960. From July 1958 it operated detachments in Alaska, Hawaii and Washington. These detachments were equipped and staffed from resources of the 57th and 58th Weather Reconnaissance Squadrons, which were inactivated to free up funds for the Air Force's intercontinental ballistic missile program. It continued operations from these locations until it was inactivated in July 1961.

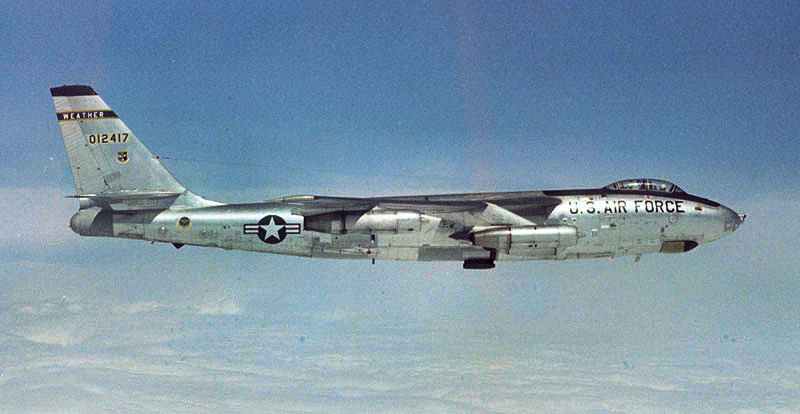
Squadron WB-47E (Note: Aircraft is Boeing B-47E-60-BW Stratojet, serial 51-2417 (later converted to WB-47E) flying an operational mission from McClellan AFB. Note the single U-1 sampling foil mounted on the right hand bomb bay door. This plane was sent to the Military Aircraft Storage and Disposition Center on 12 September 1969, declared excess six days later and scrapped. Baugher, Joe (10 May 2023). "1951 USAF Serial Numbers". Joe Baugher.)

The squadron's inactivation was brief and it was again organized at McClellan AFB in January 1962, as Air Weather Service centralized its reconnaissance units under the 9th Weather Reconnaissance Group. It added Lockheed WC-130 aircraft to its previous mix of WB-50 and WB-47 aircraft The following year it added Martin RB-57F Canberra aircraft modified for high altitude operation and retired its WB-50s. The squadron's mission involved atmospheric sampling and radiation detection work in support of nuclear test monitoring. The Canberras were transferred in 1964 and the WC-130s in 1965, but the Boeing WC-135 Constant Phoenix flew weather reconnaissance and atmospheric sampling missions over the Pacific and Arctic until 1993. The WB-47s were retired in 1969. In 1986, the squadron monitored atmospheric radiation in Europe after the Chernobyl nuclear accident in the Soviet Union. In 1988 and 1989, it tested special photographic equipment for Strategic Defense Initiative research. The squadron inactivated in 1993 with the end of the Cold War.

=== Space weather unit ===
The squadron was redesignated the 55th Space Weather Squadron and activated under Space Command in March 1997, absorbing the resources of the 50th Weather Squadron and acting as the Air Force's space forecast center. The squadron was inactivated in July 2002.

== Lineage ==
- Constituted as the 655th Bombardment Squadron, Heavy on 11 August 1944

Activated on 21 August 1944
Redesignated 55th Reconnaissance Squadron, Long Range, Weather on 16 June 1945
Redesignated 55th Reconnaissance Squadron, Very Long Range, Weather on 27 November 1945
Inactivated on 15 October 1947

- Redesignated 55th Strategic Reconnaissance Squadron, Medium, Weather on 22 January 1951

Activated on 21 February 1951
Redesignated 55th Weather Reconnaissance Squadron on 15 February 1954
Discontinued, and inactivated on 8 July 1961

- Activated on 12 October 1961 (not organized)

Organized on 8 January 1962
Inactivated on 1 October 1993

- Redesignated 55th Space Weather Squadron on 1 March 1997

Activated on 17 March 1997
Inactivated 16 July 2002

=== Assignments ===
- Third Air Force, 21 August 1944
- III Tactical Air Command, 1 October 1944
- III Tactical Air Division, by November 1944
- Twentieth Air Force, 11 April 1945 (attached to XXI Bomber Command)
- 311th Reconnaissance Wing, 27 November 1945 (attached to U.S. Army Strategic Air Forces)
- Air Transport Command, 13 March 1946 (attached to U.S. Army Strategic Air Forces)
- Air Weather Service, 20 March 1946 – 15 October 1947
- Air Weather Service, 21 February 1951
- 9th Weather Group, 20 April 1953 – 8 July 1961
- Military Air Transport Service, 12 October 1961 (not organized)
- 9th Weather Reconnaissance Group, 8 January 1962
- 9th Weather Reconnaissance Wing, 8 July 1965
- 41st Rescue and Weather Reconnaissance Wing, 1 September 1975
- Air Rescue Service, 1 August 1989
- 60th Operations Group, 1 February 1993 – 1 October 1993
- 50th Operations Group, 17 March 1997 – 16 July 2002

=== Stations ===
- Will Rogers Field, Oklahoma, 21 August 1944 – 5 March 1945
- Depot Field (later Harmon Field), Guam, Mariana Islands, 11 April 1945 – 28 February 1946
- Buckley Field, Colorado, 20 March 1946
- Langley Field, Virginia, 9 May 1946
- Morrison Field, Florida, c. 16 July 1946
- Fairfield-Suisun Army Air Field, California, 1 June–15 October 1947
- McClellan Air Force Base, California, 21 February 1951 – 8 July 1961

Detachment 1, Ladd Air Force Base, Alaska, 1 July 1958 – 8 July 1961
Detachment 2, Hickam Air Force Base, Hawaii, 1 July 1958 – 8 July 1961
Detachment 3, McChord Air Force Base, Washington, 1 July 1958 – 8 July 1961

- McClellan Air Force Base, California, 8 January 1962 – 1 October 1993
- Falcon Air Force Base (later Schriever Air Force Base), Colorado, 17 March 1997 – 16 July 2002

=== Aircraft ===
- Douglas A-20 Havoc, 1944
- Consolidated B-24 Liberator, 1944–1945
- Boeing B-29 Superfortress, 1946–1947
- Douglas C-47 Skytrain
- Boeing WB-29 Superfortress, 1951–1955
- Boeing TB-29 Superfortress, 1951–1955
- Boeing WB-50 Superfortress, 1954–1961, 1962–1963
- Boeing TB-50 Superfortress, 1958–1960
- Douglas C-54 Skymaster, 1958-1961
- Boeing WB-47 Stratojet, 1957–1961, 1962–1969
- Martin JB-57 Canberra, 1960–1961, 1962-1963
- Martin RB-57F Canberra, 1963–1964
- Lockheed C-130 Hercules, 1962–1965
- Lockheed WC-130 Hercules, 1962-1965, 1970–1975
- Lockheed HC-130 Hercules, 1975
- Boeing C-135, 1965
- Boeing WC-135 Constant Phoenix, 1965–1993

=== Awards and campaigns ===
Award streamer	Award	Dates	Notes
	Meritorious Unit Commendation	15 May 1945-1 January 1946	655th Bombardment Squadron (later 55th Reconnaissance Squadron)
	Air Force Outstanding Unit Award	1 March 1960-28 February 1961	55th Weather Reconnaissance Squadron
	Air Force Outstanding Unit Award	1 July 1967-30 June 1968	55th Weather Reconnaissance Squadron
	Air Force Outstanding Unit Award	1 January 1971-31 December 1971	55th Weather Reconnaissance Squadron
	Air Force Outstanding Unit Award	1 September 1975-1 May 1977	55th Weather Reconnaissance Squadron
	Air Force Outstanding Unit Award	16 July 1977-16 July 1979	55th Weather Reconnaissance Squadron
	Air Force Outstanding Unit Award	17 July 1979-15 June 1981	55th Weather Reconnaissance Squadron
	Air Force Outstanding Unit Award	1 April 1984-31 March 1986	55th Weather Reconnaissance Squadron
	Air Force Outstanding Unit Award	1 April 1986-31 March 1988	55th Weather Reconnaissance Squadron
	Air Force Outstanding Unit Award	1 August 1989-30 June 1991	55th Weather Reconnaissance Squadron

Campaign Streamer	Campaign	Dates	Notes
	Western Pacific	17 April 1945–2 September 1945	655th Bombardment Squadron (later 55th Reconnaissance Squadron)
