= 16th Reconnaissance Squadron (disambiguation) =

16th Reconnaissance Squadron may refer to:

- The 906th Air Refueling Squadron, designated the 16th Reconnaissance Squadron (Medium) from January 1941 to April 1942
- The 16th Electronic Warfare Squadron, designated the 16th Reconnaissance Squadron (Bomber) from May 1943 to May 1944 and 16th Reconnaissance Squadron, Heavy (Special) from May 1944 to April 1945

== See also ==
- The 16th Photographic Reconnaissance Squadron
- The 16th Tactical Reconnaissance Squadron
