= 1211th Test Squadron =

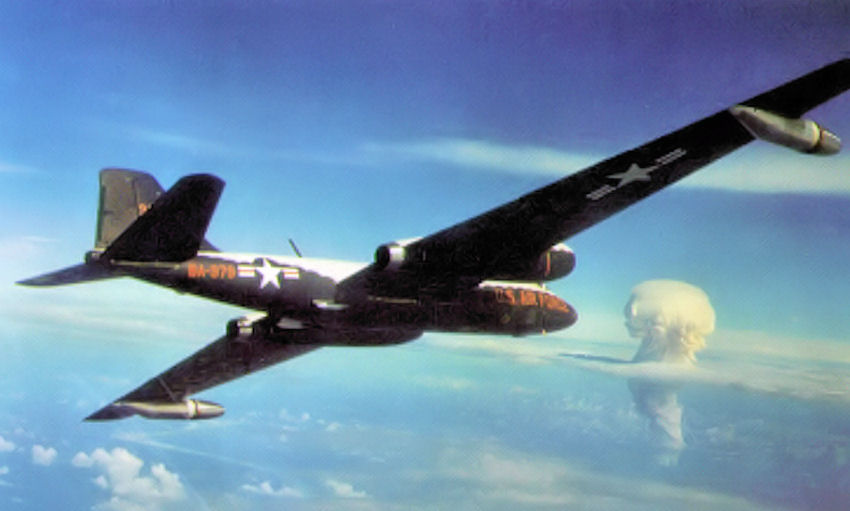
- Martin RB-57D-2 53-3979 collecting atmospheric data during Juniper Nuclear bomb test; Operation Hardtack I 22 July 1958 at Bikini Atoll
- Active: 1953–1963
- Country: United States
- Branch: United States Air Force
- Type: Atmospheric Sampling

Insignia
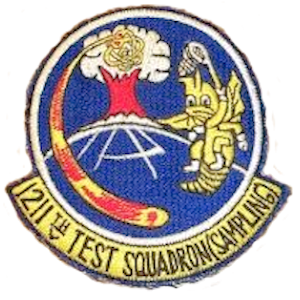
- Patch showing 1211th Test Squadron emblem

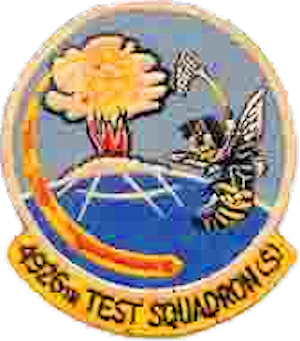
- Patch showing 4926th Test Squadron emblem

The 1211th Test Squadron is an inactive United States Air Force unit. It was last assigned to the 9th Weather Reconnaissance Group, stationed at Kirtland AFB, New Mexico. It was inactivated on 8 June 1963.

== History ==
The squadron conducted nuclear cloud sampling during atmospheric testing.

The idea of atomic cloud sampling developed from atmospheric testing during Operation Sandstone in the spring of 1948. During the operation, an aircraft accidentally flew through an atomic cloud. An analysis of the radiation dosages received by the crewmembers was found to be minor and led to the realization that sampling could be accomplished effectively with crewed aircraft.

Analyses of samples collected from atomic clouds were considered the most accurate method of determining the efficiency and yield of a nuclear device. Air Force Special Weapons Center (AFSWC) scientists accompanied the squadron on sampling missions in order to assess effects on humans. The Atomic Energy Commission (AEC) recommended that the USAF establish an organization specifically for gathering cloud samples.

In 1953, HQ, USAF approved a test squadron for sampling atomic clouds; the squadron was titled the 4926th Test Squadron (Sampling) and assigned to the 4925th Test Group (Atomic). The new squadron was created within AFSWC's 4925th Test Group (Atomic), as the group, up to that time, had assisted the AEC and AFSWP in nuclear weapons effects tests and had actually developed operational techniques for airborne sampling of the effects. These included in-flight laboratories to gather airborne data on test results, piloted and drone aircraft to sample radioactive clouds, safety aircraft to measure radioactivity in areas surrounding tests, and nuclear-cloud-tracking aircraft to establish fallout patterns.

Initially using the F-84G Thunderjet, The B-57B Canberra was first used during Operation Teapot in 1955. By 1956, the B-57B was a staple of the AFSWC sampling program. In addition to the dedicated men of the 4926th TS, many aircraft and crews were pulled from operational squadrons around the Air Force to help formulate procedures to operate successfully in a nuclear environment, if necessary. Flying the B-57, the 4926th Test Squadron (Sampling) participated in many operations, the majority at the Nevada Test Site and the remainder at Eniwetok Atoll.

In April 1961, shortly after Air Research and Development Command was redesignated Air Force Systems Command, the squadron was transferred to Air Weather Service and renumbered 1211.

With the end of atmospheric nuclear testing in 1963, the squadron was discontinued. Its personnel and aircraft were reassigned to the 58th Weather Reconnaissance Squadron.

== Lineage ==
- Designates as the 4926th Test Squadron (Sampling) and organized on 1 April 1953

Redesignated 1211th Test Squadron (Sampling) on 16 August 1961
Discontinued on 8 June 1963

=== Assignments ===
- 4925th Test Group (Atomic), 1 April 1953

Attached to 4930th Test Support Group during nuclear tests in the Pacific, 1953–1961
Attached to 4935th Air Base Squadron during nuclear tests in Nevada, 1953–1961

- 4950th Test Group (Nuclear), 1 September 1956
- 4925th Test Group (Atomic), 1960
- 9th Weather Reconnaissance Group, 16 August 1961 – 8 June 1963

=== Stations ===
- Kirtland Air Force Base, New Mexico, 1 April 1953 – 8 June 1963

Operated from: Bucholz Army Airfield, Kwajalein Atoll, Marshall Islands (During nuclear tests)
Operated from: Indian Springs Air Force Auxiliary Field, Nevada (During nuclear tests)

=== Operations ===
- Operation Upshot–Knothole, 1953 (Nevada)
- Operation Castle, 1954 (Bikini Atoll)
- Operation Teapot, 1955, (Nevada)
- Operation Wigwam, 1955, (Nevada)
- Operation Redwing, 1956 (Bikini, Enewetak Atolls)
- Operation Plumbbob, 1957, (Nevada)
- Operation Hardtack I, 1958, (Enewetak Atoll)
- Operation Hardtack II, 1958, (Nevada)
- Operation Dominic I and II, 1962–1963, (Pacific)
- Operation Storax, 1962–1963 (Nevada)
- Operation Sunbeam, 1962 (Nevada)

=== Aircraft ===
- F-84G Thunderjet, 1953–1955
- B-57B Canberra, 1955–1963
- RB-57D Canberra, 1957–1963
