= 59th Weather Reconnaissance Squadron =

United States Air Force unit, 1945–1964

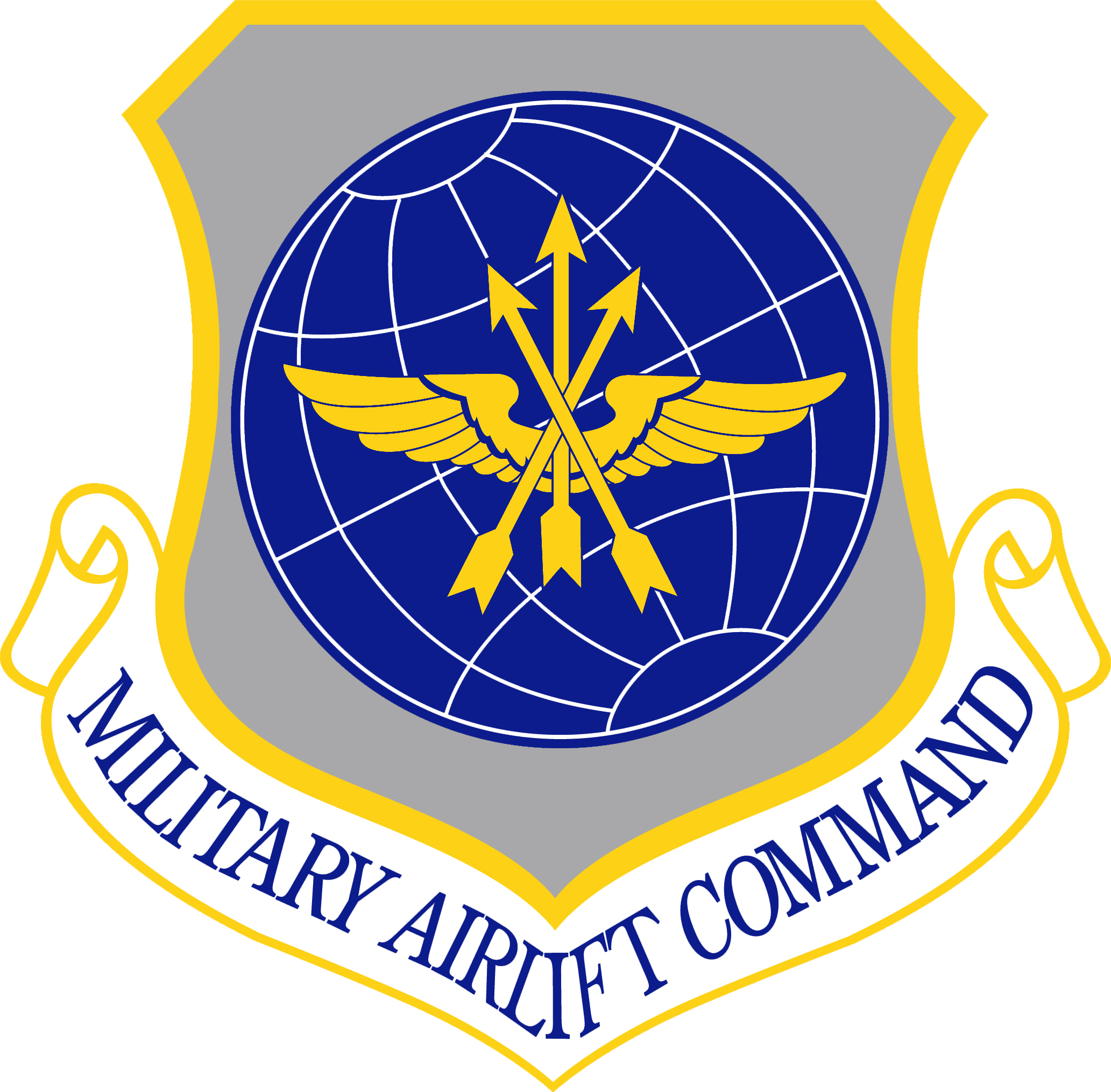
59th Weather Reconnaissance Squadron

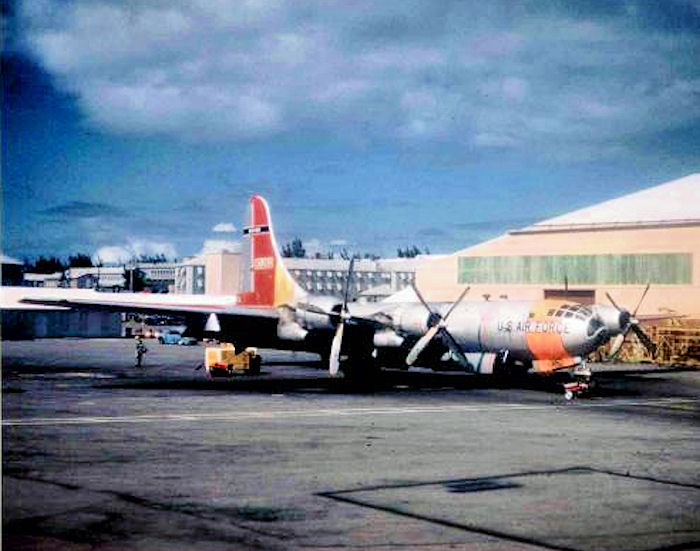
- Squadron Boeing WB-50 at Kindley AFB
- Active: 1945-1947; 1955–1960; 1963–1964
- Country: United States
- Branch: United States Air Force
- Role: Weather Reconnaissance
- Part of: Military Airlift Command
- Nickname(s): Hurricane Hunters (1956-1960)
- Motto(s): Pro Bono Publico Latin For the Public Good (1956-1960)

Insignia
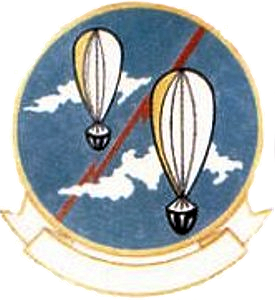
- 59th Weather Reconnaissance Squadron emblem (approved 9 January 1964)

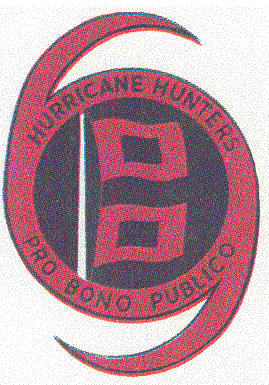
- 59th Weather Reconnaissance Flight emblem (approved 7 March 1956)

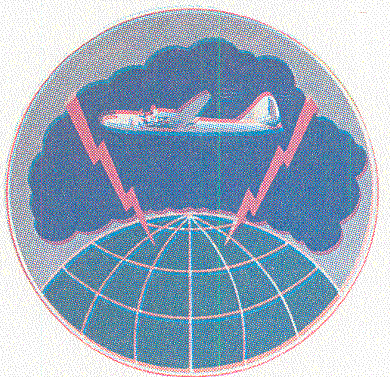
- 59th Reconnaissance Squadron emblem (approved 14 February 1947)

The 59th Weather Reconnaissance Squadron is an inactive United States Air Force unit. Its last assignment was to the 9th Weather Reconnaissance Group, stationed at Goodfellow Air Force Base, Texas.

It was inactivated on 8 May 1964.

== History ==
The 59th Reconnaissance Squadron, Very Long Range, Weather, was originally activated at Will Rogers Field, Oklahoma on 10 Aug 1945, equipped with Boeing RB-17G Flying Fortress reconnaissance aircraft. It quickly moved to Ardmore Army Air Field, Oklahoma and then on to Drew Field, Florida, followed by MacDill Field, Florida-all still in 1945. On 26 Jan 1946, the squadron moved to Castle Field, California; then again moved to Fairfield-Suisun Army Air Field, California on 22 Oct 1946, where the Flying Fortresses were replaced by F-13As (a B-29 variant), for very long range weather reconnaissance flights. Three of the squadron's F-13As were earmarked for weather reconnaissance duties in support of the atomic bomb tests at Bikini Atoll. In March 1946, three B-29s of the 59th had a variety of weather instruments installed at Tinker Field, and then departed for the Pacific and Operation Crossroads. On 25 May 1946, another F-13A of the 59th flew the first synoptic weather reconnaissance mission from Castle over the northeastern Pacific. On 1 June 1947, the 59th moved to Ladd Field, Alaska, where it was inactivated on 15 October 1947; its personnel and aircraft being absorbed into the Strategic Air Command 72d Reconnaissance Squadron.

The squadron designation was reactivated at Kindley Air Force Base, Bermuda, on 3 March 1955 as the 59th Weather Reconnaissance Flight under the 9th Weather Reconnaissance Group. It was equipped with WB-50D Superfortresses; the mission of the 59th was flying into tropical storms and hurricanes - Hurricane Hunting. On 1 April 1956, it was redesignated the 59th Weather Reconnaissance Squadron. The squadron remained at Kindley until its inactivation on 18 March 1960.

In 1963, the 59th was reactivated at Goodfellow Air Force Base, Texas when it assumed the personnel, mission and personnel of the 1212th Balloon Activities Squadron, conducting high altitude reconnaissance using balloons. It was discontinued and inactivated on 8 May 1964.

== Lineage ==
- Constituted as the 59th Reconnaissance Squadron, Long Range, Weather on 1 August 1945

Activated on 10 August 1945
Redesignated as the 59th Reconnaissance Squadron, Very Long Range, Weather on 27 November 1945
Inactivated on 15 Oct 1947

- Redesignated 59th Weather Reconnaissance Flight on 3 March 1955
- Activated on 8 May 1955

Redesignated as the 59th Weather Reconnaissance Squadron 1 April 1956
Inactivated 18 March 1960

- Activated on 1 July 1963 (not organized)

Organized on 8 July 1963
Discontinued and inactivated 8 May 1964

=== Assignments ===
- III Reconnaissance Command, 10 August 1945
- Third Air Force, 24 August 1945
- 311th Reconnaissance Wing, 7 December 1945
- Air Transport Command, 13 March 1946
- Air Weather Service, 20 March 1946 (attached to 1st Air Weather Group (Provisional) after 19 July 1946)
- 308th Reconnaissance Group, 17 October 1946 – 15 October 1947
- 9th Weather Group, 8 May 1955 – 18 March 1960
- 9th Weather Reconnaissance Group 1 July 1963 – 8 May 1964

=== Stations ===
- Will Rogers Field, Oklahoma, 10 August 1945
- Ardmore Army Airfield, Oklahoma, 20 August 1945
- Drew Field, Florida, 7 October 1945
- MacDill Field, Florida, 7 December 1945
- Castle Field, California, 26 January 1946
- Fairfield-Suisun Army Air Field, California, 22 October 1946
- Ladd Field, Alaska, 1 June–15 October 1947
- Kindley Air Force Base, Bermuda, 8 May 1955 – 18 March 1960
- Goodfellow Air Force Base, Texas 1 July 1963 – 8 May 1964

=== Aircraft ===
- TB-17 Flying Fortress, 1945-1947
- B-25 Mitchell, 1946-1947
- RB-29 Superfortress, 1946-1947, 1955-1956
- WB-50 Superfortress, 1955-1960.
