= 914th Expeditionary Air Refueling Squadron =

914th Air Refueling Squadron

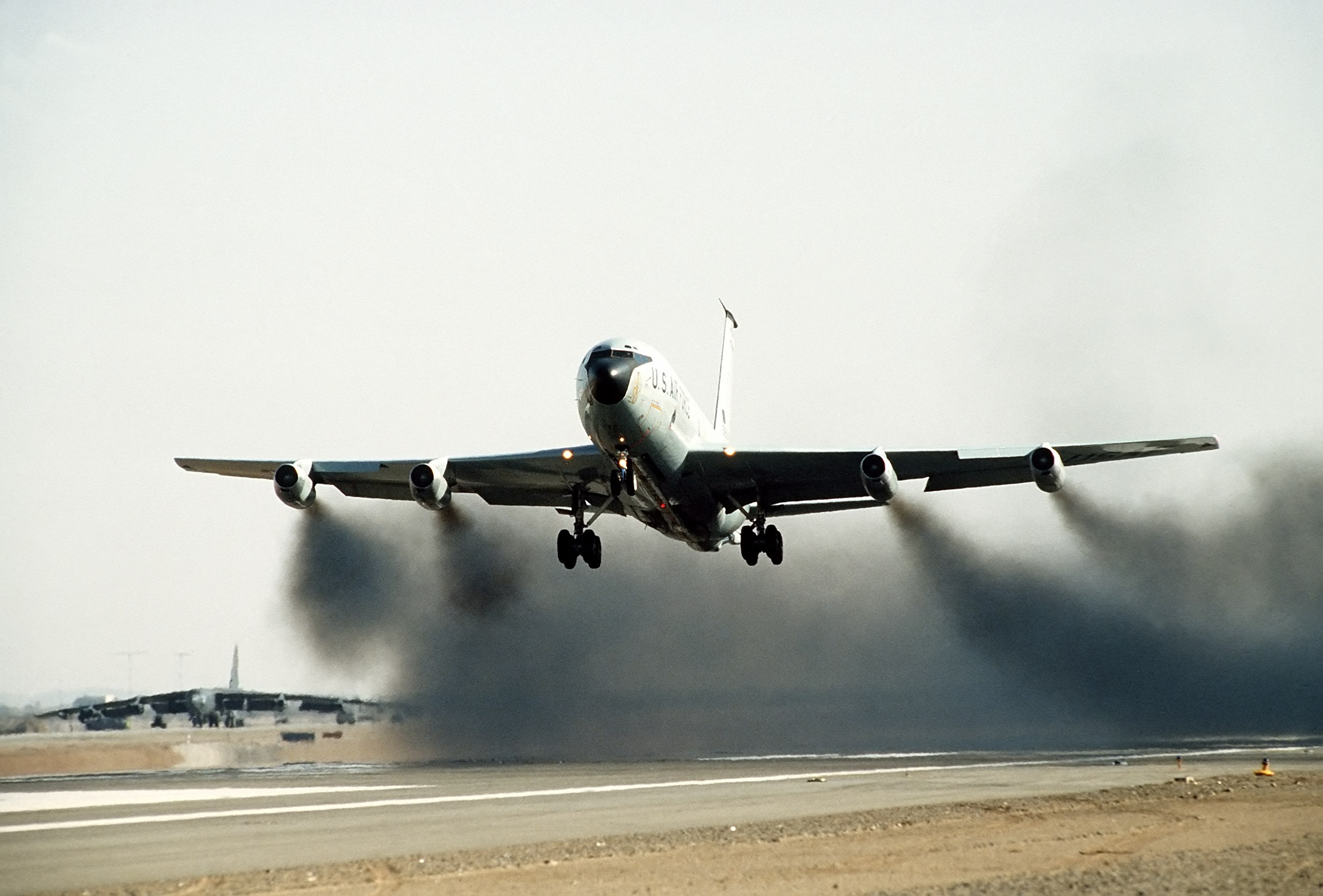
- Boeing KC-135 on takeoff using water injection to increase thrust
- Active: 1940–1944; 1961–1964
- Country: United States
- Branch: United States Air Force
- Role: Air Refueling
- Decorations: Air Force Outstanding Unit Award

Insignia
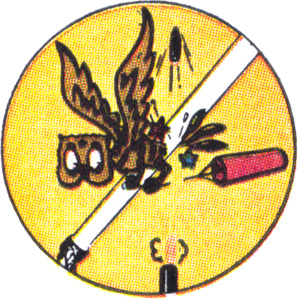
- 14 Tow Target Sq emblem (approved 6 February 1944)

The first predecessor of the 914th Expeditionary Air Refueling Squadron was organized in 1942 as the 8th Observation Squadron. It trained in the United States during World War II as a reconnaissance unit and then provided target support for antiaircraft units until being disbanded in 1944 during a general reorganization of Army Air Forces units in the United States. It was reactivated and deployed to the South West Pacific Theater of World War II and was inactivated in the Philippines in February 1946.

The 914th Air Refueling Squadron was activated by the United States Air Force in 1961 at Blytheville Air Force Base, Arkansas, where it was assigned to the 97th Bombardment Wing. The squadron flew Boeing KC-135 Stratotanker aircraft to support the Strategic Air Command. It was inactivated in 1964, when its mission, personnel and equipment were transferred to the 97th Air Refueling Squadron.

The two squadrons were consolidated in September 1985 but the consolidated squadron was not activated. In 2003 it was redesignated the 914th Expeditionary Air Refueling Squadron, converted to provisional status, and assigned to Air Mobility Command to activate or inactivate as needed.

== History ==
=== World War II ===
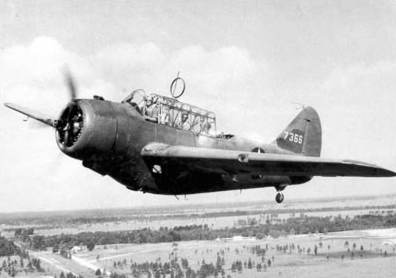
O-47 as flown by the 8th Observation Squadron

The first predecessor of the squadron was activated as the 8th Observation Squadron at Pope Field, North Carolina in February 1942. Two months after activating, it moved to Langley Field, Virginia. Although the squadron was equipped with a variety of aircraft, at Langley it flew primarily Martin B-10 and North American O-47 aircraft. At Langley the unit began the target towing mission in addition to the artillery spotting mission of an observation squadron. The squadron moved to Camp Davis Army Air Field, North Carolina a month later and by the end of the year was redesignated the 14th Tow Target Squadron. While at Camp Davis the squadron was assigned several Women Airforce Service Pilots.

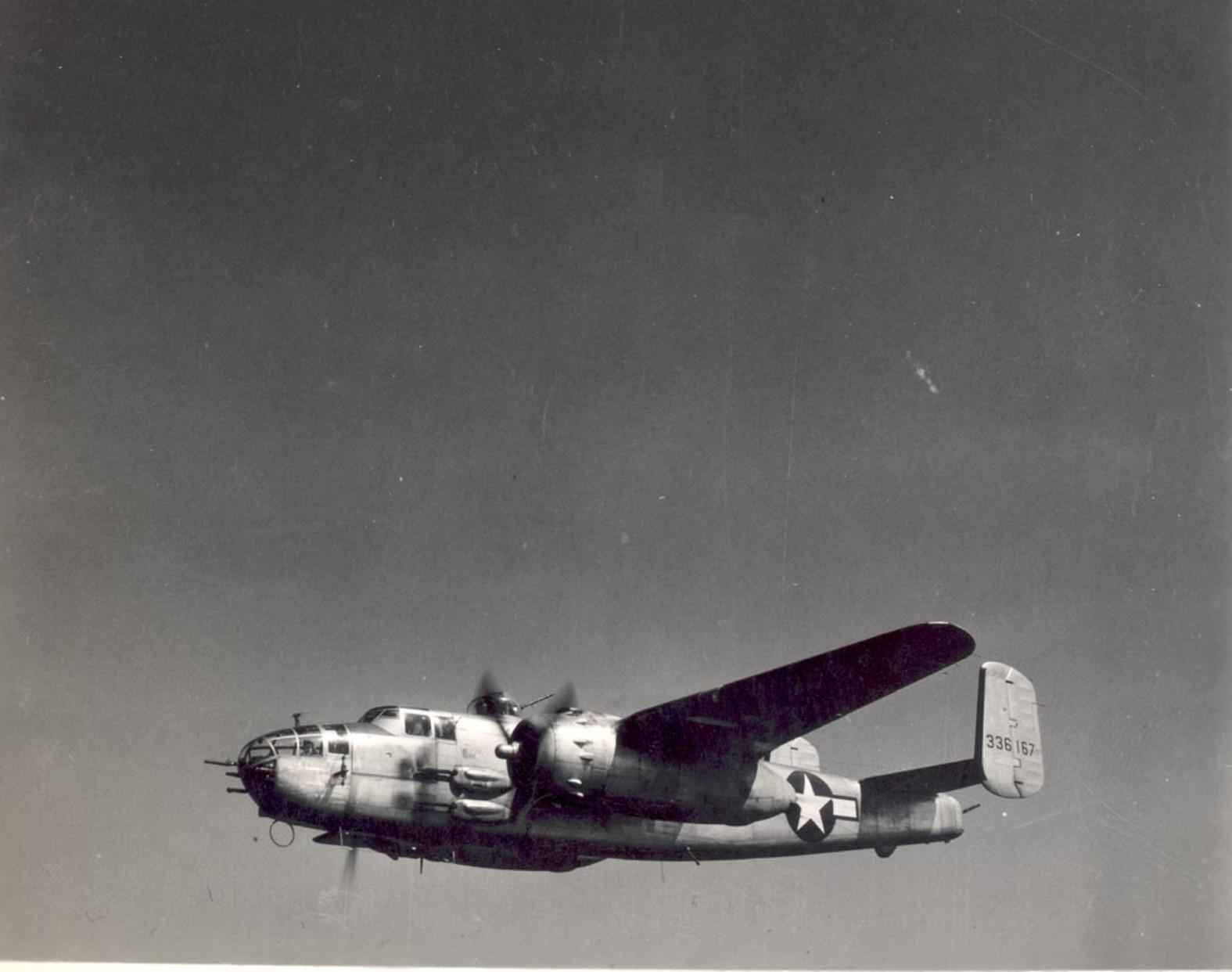
B-25 as flown by 14 Tow Target Squadron

However, by 1944 the Army Air Forces found that standard military units, based on relatively inflexible tables of organization, were proving less well adapted to the training mission. Accordingly, it adopted a more functional system in which each base was organized into a separate numbered unit, while the groups and squadrons acting as training units were disbanded or inactivated. This resulted in the 14th, along with other units at Camp Davis, being disbanded in the spring of 1944 and being replaced by an AAF Base Unit which absorbed the squadron's mission, personnel, and equipment. (Note: At the time of the AAF reorganization, Camp Davis AAF was a subbase of Bluethenthal Field. where the 130th AAF Base Unit was organized. "Abstract, History Bluethenthal Field. Apr 1944 – Aug 1945". Air Force History Index.)

The squadron was reconstituted in the fall of 1944 at McChord Field, Washington and equipped with North American B-25 Mitchell bombers modified to serve as target tugs. Its personnel moved to Camp Stoneman, California in November and shipped out to the Pacific Theater of Operations on 12 December. It arrived on Biak, an island north of New Guinea, on 6 January 1945, then moved to Nadzab Airfield on the main island, (Note: During World War II, this section of New Guinea was part of the Dutch East Indies.) where it began towing targets for artillery and air-to-air gunnery training. The squadron moved to Clark Field on Luzon in the Philippines, where it continued its mission until December 1945. It was inactivated on 1 February 1946.

=== Cold War ===
The 914th Air Refueling Squadron was organized in October 1961 by Strategic Air Command (SAC) at Blytheville Air Force Base, Arkansas. The squadron was equipped with Boeing KC-135 Stratotankers and assigned to the 97th Bombardment Wing as part of SAC's plan to disperse its Boeing B-52 Stratofortress units to make it more difficult for the Soviet Union to destroy the entire fleet with a first strike. The 914th ARS received its first KC-135A on 17 January 1962. The aircraft was named Arkansas Traveler, after the Arkansas folklore character. The squadron's mission was to provide air refueling to the B-52s of its parent wing and other USAF units as directed. One-third of the squadron's aircraft were maintained on fifteen-minute alert, fully fueled and ready for combat to reduce vulnerability to a Soviet missile strike. This was increased to half the squadron's aircraft in 1962 for the Cuban Missile Crisis. The 914th ARS received the Air Force Outstanding Unit Award for its work during and after the crisis. The squadron trained for this mission until inactivation. The 914th ARS was inactivated in October 1964 to make way for the 97th Air Refueling Squadron, which was transferred from Malmstrom Air Force Base, Montana to take over refueling duties for the 97th Wing.

The 14th Tow Target Squadron was consolidated with the 914th Air Refueling Squadron in September 1985 but the consolidated squadron has not been active since.

On 27 March 2003 the squadron was converted to provisional status as the 914th Expeditionary Air Refueling Squadron and assigned to Air Mobility Command to activate or inactivate as needed for contingency operations.

== Lineage ==
14th Tow Target Squadron

- Constituted as the 8th Observation Squadron (Special) on 28 January 1942

Activated on 3 February 1942
Redesignated the 14th Tow Target Squadron on 12 December 1942
Disbanded on 10 April 1944
Reconstituted on 26 September 1944

- Activated on 6 October 1944

Inactivated on 1 February 1946

- Consolidated with the 914th Air Refueling Squadron as the 914th Air Refueling Squadron on 19 September 1985

914th Air Refueling Squadron

- Constituted as the 914th Air Refueling Squadron, Heavy on 17 May 1961 and activated (not organized)

Organized on 1 October 1961
Discontinued and inactivated on 23 October 1964

- Consolidated with the 14th Tow Target Squadron on 19 September 1985 (remained inactive)
- Redesignated 914th Expeditionary Air Refueling Squadron and converted to provisional status on 27 March 2003

=== Assignments ===
- Office of the Chief of Air Corps, 3 February 1942
- Third Air Force, 12 December 1942
- I Air Support Command (later I Tactical Air Division), 17 December 1942
- First Air Force, 4 November 1943 – 1 April 1944
- Fourth Air Force, 6 October 1944
- 360th Service Group, c. 9 January 1945
- XIII Bomber Command, c. November 1945
- Thirteenth Air Force, 27 December 1945 – 1 February 1946
- 97th Bombardment Wing, 1 October 1961 – 23 October 1964

=== Stations ===
- Pope Field, North Carolina, 3 February 1942
- Langley Field, Virginia, 4 April 1942
- Camp Davis Army Air Field, North Carolina, 8 May 1942 – 10 April 1944
- McChord Field, Washington, 6 October 1944 – 17 November 1944
- Nadzab Airfield, New Guinea (now West Papua), 9 January 1945
- Clark Field, Luzon, Philippines, c. 17 July 1945 – 1 February 1946
- Blytheville Air Force Base, Arkansas, 1 October 1961 – 23 October 1964

=== Aircraft ===
- Douglas A-20 and P-70 Havoc, 1945
- Douglas A-24 Banshee, 1942–1944
- Martin B-10, 1942–1944
- North American B-25 Mitchell, 1945
- Lockheed B-34 Lexington, 1942–1944
- Stinson L-1 Vigilant, 1942–1944
- Piper L-4 Grasshopper, 1942–1944
- North American O-47, 1942–1944
- O-52, 1942–1944
- Republic P-47 Thunderbolt, 1942–1944
- Boeing KC-135A Stratotanker, 1961–1964

=== Awards and campaigns ===
| Award streamer | Award | Dates | Notes |
|---|---|---|---|
| | Air Force Outstanding Unit Award | 23 October 1962-22 November 1962 | 914th Air Refueling Squadron |

| Campaign Streamer | Campaign | Dates | Notes |
|---|---|---|---|
| | American Theater without inscription | 3 February 1942 – 1 April 1944; 6 October 1944 – 17 November 1944 | 8th Observation Squadron (later 14th Tow Target Squadron) |
| | Asiatic-Pacific Theater without inscription | 9 January 1945 – 1 February 1946 | 14th Tow Target Squadron |

== See also ==
- List of United States Air Force reconnaissance squadrons
- List of United States Air Force air refueling squadrons
- List of A-20 Havoc operators
