= 311th Air Division =

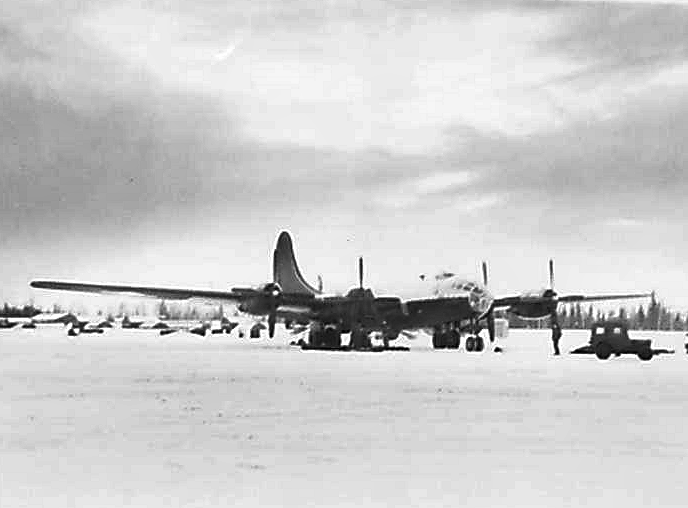
- 72d Strategic Reconnaissance Squadron RB-29 Superfortress on the ramp at Ladd AFB
- Active: 1944–1949
- Country: United States
- Branch: United States Air Force
- Role: Command of reconnaissance units
- Engagements: American Theater of World War II

The 311th Air Division is an inactive United States Air Force organization. Its last assignment was with Strategic Air Command at Barksdale Air Force Base, Louisiana, where it was inactivated on 1 November 1949. The division was first activated in 1944 as the 311th Photographic Wing. Although it was stationed in the United States, throughout its existence, the unit was responsible for the control of long range reconnaissance units in multiple theaters.

== History ==
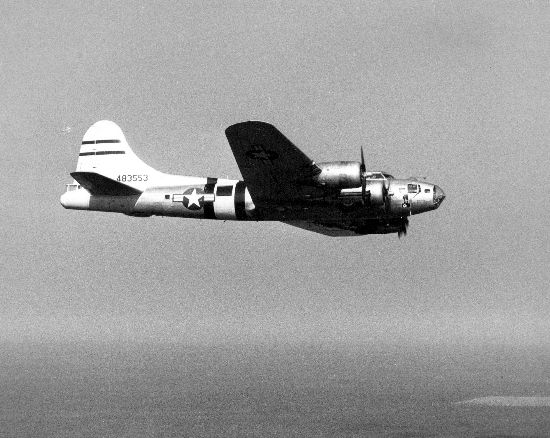
Boeing F-9 reconnaissance aircraft

The 311th first came into existence in February 1944 as the 311th Photographic Wing at Bolling Field in Washington, DC and was assigned to nearby Headquarters, Army Air Forces. Initially, the wing acted as a task force headquarters with no permanently assigned units. In March, the 1st Photographic Group at Peterson Field, Colorado and the 11th Photographic Group at MacDill Field, Florida, were assigned to the wing. These two groups had squadrons performing mapping and charting functions in the US and in overseas theaters. In October 1944, the two groups were disbanded, and their squadrons were assigned directly to the 311th Wing.

The flying squadrons transferred to the wing were the 1st, 2d, 4th and 19th Photographic Charting Squadrons; the 6th and 16th Photographic Squadrons and the 91st Photographic Mapping Squadron. Little more than a month later, the wing moved to Buckley Field, Colorado, which had become the home of the 1st Group in July. However, the wing served as an administrative headquarters for its mapping and charting units, with operational control resting with other headquarters.

The 1st Photographic Charting Squadron was soon reassigned to Second Air Force and began to train with the Boeing F-13 Superfortress. Although it returned to the wing in 1945, it was then stationed in Okinawa and under the operational control of other headquarters.

Although it remained assigned to the wing until 1947, the 2d Photographic Charting Squadron was already in the process of deploying to the Southwest Pacific Theater when it was assigned in 1944, and was detached to Far East Air Forces the entire time it was assigned to the wing.

The 4th Photographic Charting Squadron also deployed to the Southwest Pacific and was attached to headquarters there until it was inactivated in April 1946.

The 19th Photographic Charting Squadron headquarters remained in the United States. However, its air echelon was located in Egypt until January 1945. In May 1945, the squadron's air echelon moved to Accra, Gold Coast (now Ghana) to begin mapping Africa with its Boeing F-9 Flying Fortresses. The air echelon moved to Europe and was joined by the remainder of the squadron in June 1945, engaging in mapping activities in Europe under the control of Ninth Air Force until inactivating in December 1945.

Like the 19th Squadron, the headquarters of the 91st Photographic Mapping Squadron remained in the United States. However, the squadron's flights were involved with mapping operations in South America and it maintained flights in Talara, Peru until 1944, then at Atkinson Field, Trinidad, Howard Field, Panama and Natal, Brazil. In August 1946, the squadron moved to Panama and was assigned to Caribbean Air Command.

The 6th Photographic Squadron, which was a photographic compilation unit located at Jefferson Barracks, and the 16th Photographic Squadron remained in the United States under the wing's control.

In July 1945, the wing and its mapping squadrons replaced "Photographic" in their names with "Reconnaissance", reflecting the fact that its deployed units performed reconnaissance missions for overseas headquarters in addition to the mapping and charting missions they were deployed to perform. The Army Air Forces had formed Continental Air Forces in December 1944 as an intermediate headquarters for its four Numbered Air Forces and I Troop Carrier Command, which had been assigned directly to Headquarters, Army Air Forces. In December 1945, the wing was also assigned to Continental Air Forces.

Following the end of World War II, The Army Air Forces reorganized its combat forces into Strategic, Tactical and Air Defense Commands in the spring of 1946. The 311th Reconnaissance Wing became part of Strategic Air Command (SAC) in this realignment. The wing and the units still assigned to it moved to MacDill Field, Florida in April 1946. MacDill had been a training base for reconnaissance units, and the 89th Reconnaissance Training Wing had been inactivated there earlier in the month.

=== Post war operations ===
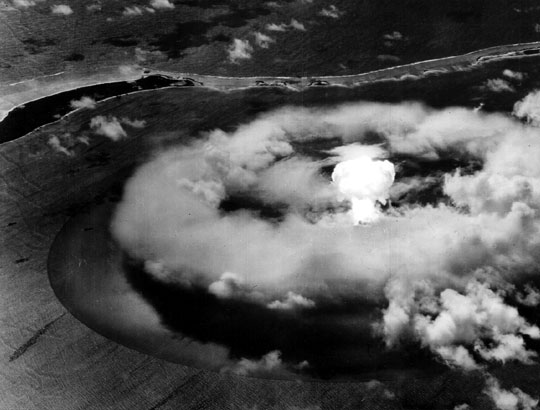
Aerial photography of nuclear test

Upon this reorganization, the wing became SAC's primary reconnaissance organization. Although postwar reductions had resulted in the inactivation or reassignment of a number of the wing's original squadrons, the wing briefly assumed responsibility for the Army Air Forces' weather reconnaissance units. This began with the transfer of the 1st and 3d Weather Reconnaissance Squadrons at Grenier Field in February 1945. The 1st was inactivated in late 1945, but at that time the wing added the 54th and 55th Reconnaissance Squadrons, Very Long Range, Weather on Guam from Twentieth Air Force and the 59th Reconnaissance Squadron, Long Range, Weather from Third Air Force. By March 1946, however, it was decided to assign responsibility for weather reconnaissance to Air Weather Service and these units were transferred to it.

Two former B-29 bombardment squadrons assigned to SAC bombardment groups, the 6th and 10th Reconnaissance Squadrons, were transferred to the wing in March 1946, but both were inactivated at the end of the month.

In 1947, the wing was assigned groups for the first time since the 1st and 11th Groups were disbanded in 1944. In February, the 55th Reconnaissance Group was activated at MacDill and assigned to the wing. In October, the 91st Reconnaissance Group, which had been recently activated at McGuire Air Force Base, New Jersey was also assigned. The 55th Group focused on mapping operations, particularly for SHORAN and HIRAN navigation systems.

=== From wing to division ===
In 1947, the Air Force began to experiment with the wing base reorganization, which assigned operational groups and support organizations on individual bases to a single wing headquarters. In 1948, this reorganization was made permanent and wings like the 311th, which had groups at multiple bases became divisions. The wing became the 311th Air Division and its 55th and 91st Groups now reported to the new 55th and 91st Strategic Reconnaissance Wings.

The division's mission was to develop, test, and improve the equipment, tactics and techniques of strategic reconnaissance; to train replacement aircrews for SAC and overseas commands. It produced target charts, maps and related materials for SAC. As the headquarters for Aeronautical Charting Service, it was responsible for targeting charts and maps, in particular for SAC.

Through April 1948, the bulk of the division's assets were involved with Operation Sandstone, nuclear weapons tests at Eniwetok Atoll. The division and the 55th Group moved from MacDill to Topeka Air Force Base, which had been reopened to receive them in July 1948. During the Berlin Airlift, elements of the division produced documentary coverage of airlift operations in Berlin.

The May 1949 Air Force Reserve program called for a new type of unit, the Corollary unit, which was a reserve unit integrated with an active duty unit. It was viewed as the best method to train reservists by mixing them with an existing regular unit to perform duties alongside the regular unit. In June 1949, the division added the responsibility to train reservists to its mission, when the 66th Strategic Reconnaissance Group, was activated at McGuire Air Force Base, New Jersey and assigned to the division as a corollary unit of the 91st Strategic Reconnaissance Wing.

Despite adding two new wings in 1949, the 5th Strategic Reconnaissance Wing at Mountain Home Air Force Base, Idaho, and the 9th Strategic Reconnaissance Wing at Fairfield-Suisun Air Force Base, California, the wing was impacted by President Truman's reduced 1949 defense budget which required reductions in the number of units in the Air Force. (Note: The 9th Wing was newly activated, but the 5th Wing was reassigned from Far East Air Forces, and moved from Clark Air Base in the Philippines. It moved in stages, and two of its squadrons were temporarily assigned directly to the division in April 1949. Maurer, Combat Squadrons, pp. 152-153, 264-265) Forbes Air Force Base (the new name for Topeka Air Force Base) was scheduled to close and the 55th Wing there was to inactivate. Mountain Home Air Force Base was also on the closure list and the 5th Wing was scheduled to merge its operations with the 9th Wing at Fairfield-Suisun. McGuire was transferred to Continental Air Command, and the 91st Wing moved to Barksdale Air Force Base, Louisiana on 1 October. In late October the division joined the 91st at Barksdale, where it inactivated on 1 November 1949, while its personnel and equipment were transferred to Second Air Force, which was simultaneously activated.

== Lineage ==
- Established as the 311th Photographic Wing, Mapping and Charting on 31 January 1944

Activated on 1 February 1944
Redesignated 311th Reconnaissance Wing on 30 July 1945
Redesignated 311th Air Division, Reconnaissance on 16 April 1948
Redesignated 311th Air Division on 5 January 1949
Inactivated on 1 November 1949

=== Assignments ===
- United States Army Air Forces, 1 February 1944
- Continental Air Forces (later Strategic Air Command), 13 December 1945
- Fifteenth Air Force, 11 May 1946
- Strategic Air Command, 31 March 1947 – 1 November 1949.

=== Components ===
Service

- Aeronautical Charting Service (see 36th AAF Base Unit)

Wings

- 5th Strategic Reconnaissance Wing: 16 July–1 November 1949
- 9th Strategic Reconnaissance Wing: 1 May–1 November 1949
- 55th Strategic Reconnaissance Wing: 19 July 1948 – 14 October 1949
- 91st Strategic Reconnaissance Wing: 10 November 1948 – 1 November 1949

Groups

- 1st Photographic Group: 5 March–5 October 1944
- 5th Reconnaissance Group: 26 May–16 July 1949
- 11th Photographic Group: 5 March–5 October 1944
- 55th Reconnaissance Group: 24 February 1947 – 19 July 1948
- 66th Strategic Reconnaissance Group: 27 June–1 November 1949
- 91st Reconnaissance Group: 1 October 1947 – 10 November 1948
- 4205th Air Base Group: 12 December 1948 – 16 July 1949

Squadrons

- 1st Photographic Charting Squadron (later 1st Photographic Reconnaissance Squadron; 1st Reconnaissance Squadron): 5 October–10 November 1944; 4 October 1945 – 3 February 1947 (attached to Eighth Air Force to 10 December 1945, VII Bomber Command to March 1946, Eighth Air Force to 7 June 1946, 1st Air Division)
- 1st Strategic Reconnaissance Squadron: 10 October 1948 – 1 June 1949 (attached to 55th Strategic Reconnaissance Wing, 10–26 Oct 1948, 55th Strategic Reconnaissance Group, 27 October 1948 – 1 June 1949)
- 1st Weather Reconnaissance Squadron: 9 Feb – 21 December 1945
- 2d Photographic Technical Squadron: 14 April 1946 – 19 August 1946
- 2d Photographic Charting Squadron(later 2d Reconnaissance Squadron): 5 October 1944 – 31 March 1946 (attached to Far East Air Forces after c. 20 October 1944)
- 3d Weather Reconnaissance Squadron (later 3d Reconnaissance Squadron; 53d Reconnaissance Squadron): c. 15 February 1945 – 13 March 1946
- 4th Photographic Charting Squadron (later 4th Reconnaissance Squadron): 5 October 1944 – 14 April 1946 (attached to Thirteenth Air Force c. 7 Nov 1944, 4th Photographic Group, December 1944, 6th Reconnaissance Group, 3 May 1945, 308th Bombardment Wing (Note: This wing was active in the Pacific from 1944 to 1948 and is not related to the 308th Bombardment Wing established in 1951.).22 October 1945 –14 April 1946)
- 6th Photographic Squadron: 5 October 1944 – 1 January 1945
- 7th Geodetic Control Squadron: 14 April 1946 – 1946
- 6th Reconnaissance Squadron: 7–31 March 1946
- 10th Reconnaissance Squadron: 7–31 March 1946
- 10th Photographic Technical Squadron: c. August 1947 – 23 August 1948
- 12th Photographic Technical Squadron (later 9th Reconnaissance Technical Squadron): 19 July 1948 – 1 June 1949
- 16th Photographic Squadron: 5 October 1944 – 1 June 1947
- 16th Reconnaissance Squadron: attached 21 November 1944 – 12 April 1945
- 16th Photographic Reconnaissance Squadron: 16 December 1947 – 1 June 1949
- 19th Photographic Charting Squadron (later 19th Reconnaissance Squadron): 5 October 1944 – 15 December 1945 (attached to Ninth Air Force, 15 May–15 November 1945)
- 20th Strategic Reconnaissance Squadron: 21 July–1 November 1949
- 31st Strategic Reconnaissance Squadron: 1 April-l November 1949
- 54th Reconnaissance Squadron: 27 November 1945 – 13 March 1946 (attached to Twentieth Air Force 8 December 1945 – 28 February 1946)
- 55th Reconnaissance Squadron: 1 January–13 March 1946
- 59th Reconnaissance Squadron: c. 11 December 1945 – 13 March 1946
- 72d Strategic Reconnaissance Squadron: 1 April–28 June 1949
- 91st Photographic Mapping Squadron (later 91st Photographic Charting Squadron, 91st Reconnaissance Squadron): 5 October 1944 – 26 August 1946
- 4201st Motion Picture Squadron (see 1st Motion Picture Unit)
- 4203d Photographic Technical Squadron: 23 August 1948 – 1 November 1949

Units

- 1st Motion Picture Unit (later 4201st Motion Picture Squadron): by 15 March 1948 – 1 November 1949
- 2d Combat Camera Unit: 1 June 1949 – 26 September 1949 (attached to 91st Strategic Reconnaissance Wing)
- 7th Photographic Technical Unit: 5 October 1944 – 1 July 1949
- 11th Photographic Technical Unit: 5 October 1944 – c. 23 August 1948
- 12th Photographic Technical Unit: c. April 1946 – c. 23 August 1948
- 36th AAF Base Unit (Headquarters, Aeronautical Charting Service) (later 36th AAF Base Unit [Headquarters, Aeronautical Charting Service], Headquarters, Aeronautical Charting Service), May 47 – 1 November 1949

=== Stations ===
- Bolling Field, Washington, DC, 1 February 1944
- Buckley Field, Colorado, c. 24 November 1944
- MacDill Field, Florida, c. 17 April 1946
- Andrews Field (later Andrews Air Force Base), Maryland, c. 1 June 1947
- Topeka Air Force Base (later Forbes Air Force Base), Kansas, c. 20 July 1948
- Barksdale Air Force Base, Louisiana, c. 28 October – 1 November 1949

=== Aircraft ===
- Lockheed A-29 Hudson, 1944
- Beechcraft AT-11 Kansan, 1944–1946
- Boeing B-17 Flying Fortress, 1944–1945, 1947–1949
- Boeing F-9 Flying Fortress, 1944–1945, 1946–1947
