= 9th Weather Reconnaissance Wing =

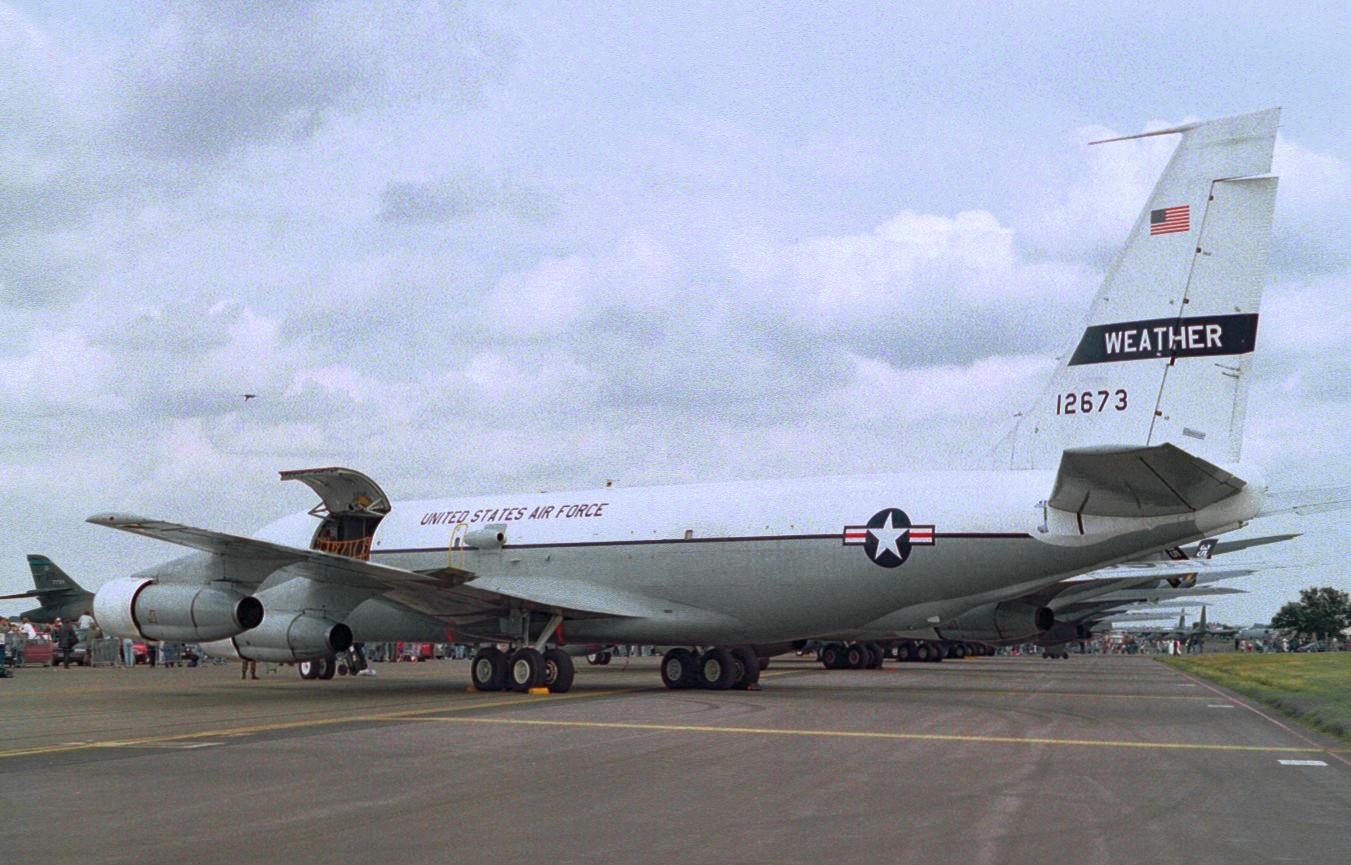
- Wing WC-135B (Note: The external air-sampling pod is visible immediately underneath the word "States")
- Active: 1952-1965; 1965–1975
- Country: United States
- Branch: United States Air Force
- Role: Weather reconnaissance
- Decorations: Air Force Outstanding Unit Award

Insignia
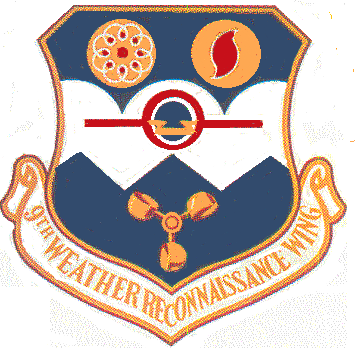
- 9th Weather Reconnaissance Wing emblem (Note: Approved 19 February 1966. Significance: Against the blue background which represents the sky, the primary theater of Air Force operations, the weather fess, symbolizing warm and cold fronts with the anemometer represent the weather mission of the wing and denotes its assignment to the Air Weather Service. The sphere within the red ring braced by lightning alludes to atmospheric sampling and weather reconnaissance on a worldwide basis. The nuclear rose, its nine rings representing the wing's numerical designation and the hurricane symbol refer to research in the field of weather forecasting and control. The emblem bears the national colors of red, white and blue and The Air Force colors of golden yellow and ultramarine blue.)

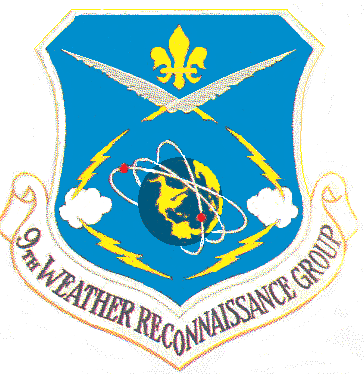
- 9th Weather Reconnaissance Group emblem (Note: Approved 19 March 1964. Significance: The fleur-de-lis is from the device of the Air Weather Service to which this group is subordiate. Atmospheric sampling and weather reconnaissance on a worldwide basis are represented by the globe and orbiting electrons between clouds and lightning. The recording function is represented by the quill pens.)

There were two Air Weather Service headquarters responsible for global weather reconnaissance. The first, the 9th Weather Group included weather reconnaissance as one of its missions from its organization in 1953. In 1960, the group added the mission of sampling for particles from nuclear explosions. In 1961, it became the 9th Weather Reconnaissance Group and united all weather reconnaissance units in a single organizetion.

In 1965, the 9th Weather Reconnaissance Wing (Note: During World War II, there was also a 9th Weather Reconnaissance Squadron, a provisional unit that conducted weather reconnaissance missions over Europe for Ninth Air Force.) replaced the group and assumed its mission and personnel. It supported space missions, and from 1967 through 1972 flew weather modification missions, primarily in Southeast Asia. The wing was inactivated in September 1975, when Aerospace Rescue and Recovery Service took over the weather reconnaissance mission and Strategic Air Command assumed its remaining sampling duties.

Both the group and the wing were assigned to Air Weather Service and were stationed at McClellan Air Force Base, California, although their subordinate squadrons were located at bases in the United States and overseas

== History ==
=== 9th Group ===
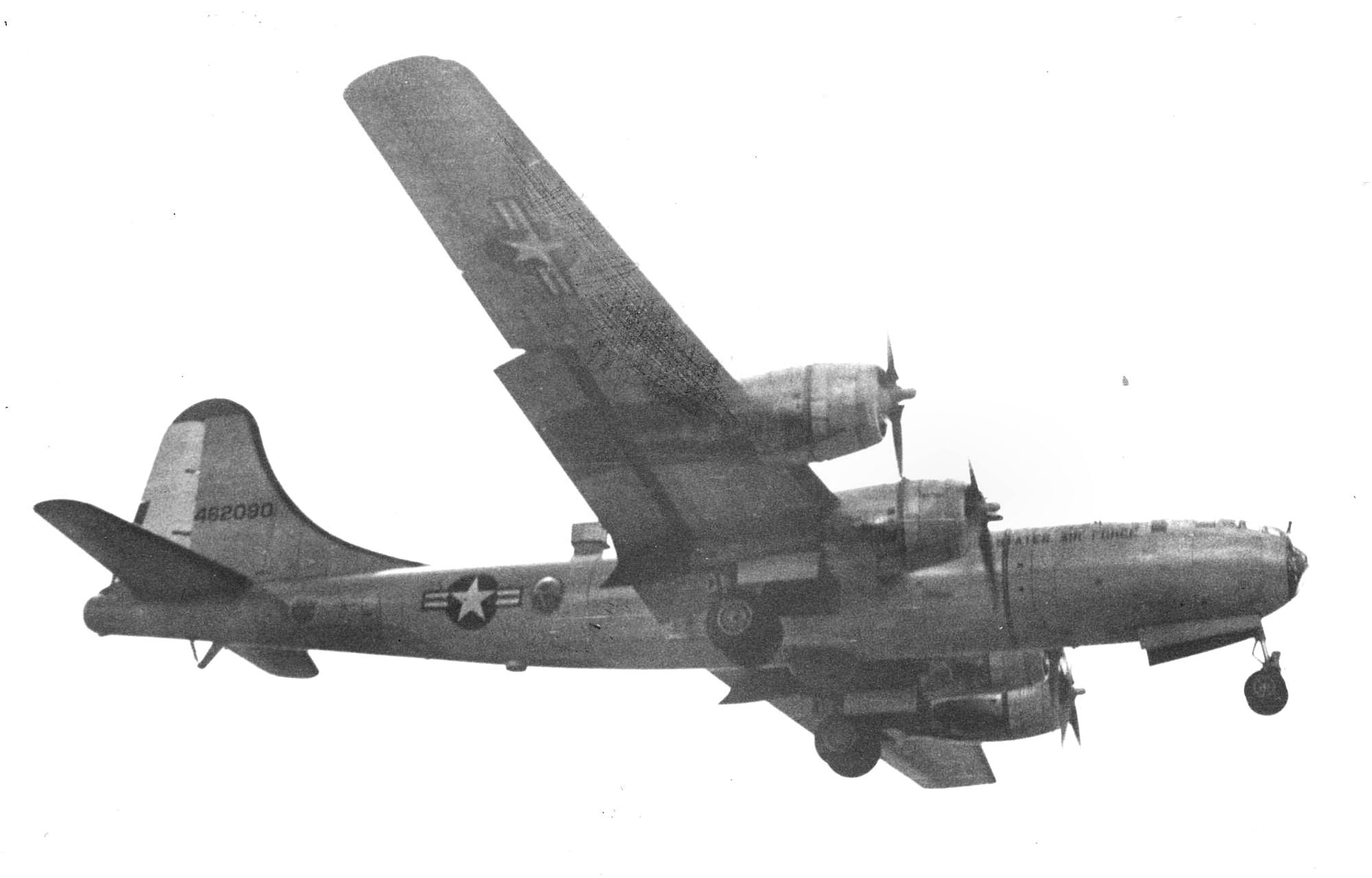
53rd Squadron Boeing WB-29A (Note: Aircraft is Boeing WB-29A-60-BN Superfortress, serial 44-62090. Originally a B-29A.)

The group was first activated as the 9th Weather Group in 1953 at Andrews Air Force Base, and was responsible for providing weather observation and forecasting services for units of Military Air Transport Service (MATS). The group was also assigned the 53rd Strategic Reconnaissance Squadron at Kindley Air Force Base, Bermuda and the 55th Strategic Reconnaissance Squadron at McClellan Air Force Base, California. The assignment of the 53rd was brief, only lasting until November, when the squadron moved to RAF Burtonwood and was reassigned. The 55th remained part of the group until it was inactivated in July 1961.

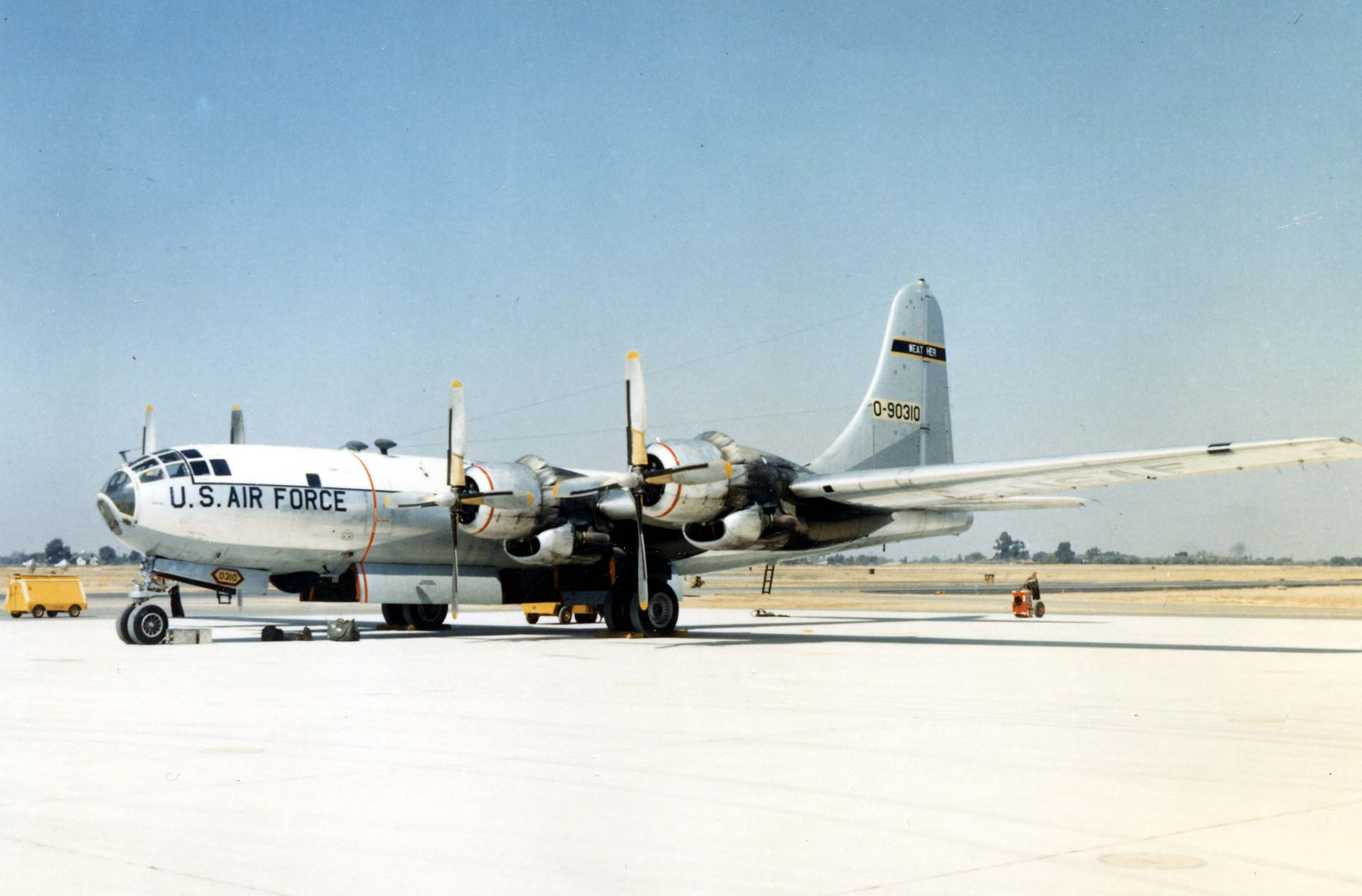
Group WB-50D (Note: Aircraft is Boeing WB-50D-115-BO, serial 49-310. Originally constructed as a B-50D. It served at various times with the 55th, 56th, and 57th Weather Reconnaissance Squadrons. It was placed on display at the Air Force Museum in 1971. Dirkx, Marco (24 April 2024). "1949 USAF Serial Numbers". Joe Baugher’s Serial Number List.)

In May 1955, the group resumed operations at Kindley when the 59th Weather Reconnaissance Squadron was activated there. In 1957, the group moved with MATS to Scott Air Force Base, Illinois. In November 1957, the group's 55th Squadron received the first Boeing WB-47 Stratojet assigned to Air Weather Service. The 58th Weather Reconnaissance Squadron at Eielson Air Force Base, Alaska was assigned to the group in April 1958, but was inactivated in August and replaced by a detachment of the 55th Squadron.

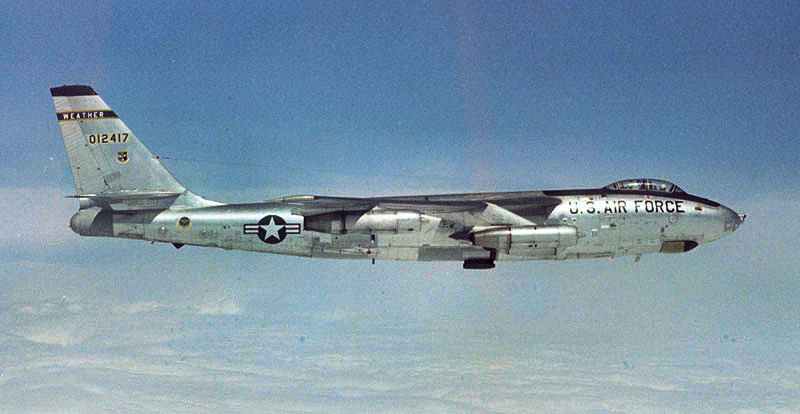
55th Squadron WB-47E Stratojet (Note: Constructed as Boeing B-47E-60-BW Stratojet, serial 51-2418. After its service with the 55th Squadron, it was declared excess and scrapped in September 1969. Dirkx, Marco (28 July 2025). "1951 USAF Serial Numbers". Joe Baugher’s Serial Number List.)

In 1960, the group began adding sampling units. In January, the 1110th Balloon Activities Squadron at Goodfellow Air Force Base, Texas was transferred to the group and renumbered the 1212th Balloon Activities Squadron. The squadron launched and recovered high altitude unmanned balloons that gathered particulate debris and air samples supporting United States nuclear programs. Samples were gathered from altitudes between 70,000 feet (21,000 m) and 120,000 feet (37,000 m). In August, the 4926th Test Squadron at Kirtland Air Force Base, New Mexico was transferred to the group and redesignated the 1211th Test Squadron. Its mission was worldwide support of the United States nuclear testing program by collecting, monitoring and tracking nuclear particles in the atmosphere. These transfers implemented Air Weather Service's designation as the Department of Defense single manager for aerial sampling. This added balloons and Martin RB-57 Canberras to the group's inventory, along with Piasecki H-21 Workhorses for recovery operations. In October 1962, the group received the first Lockheed WC-130B configured for aerial sampling.

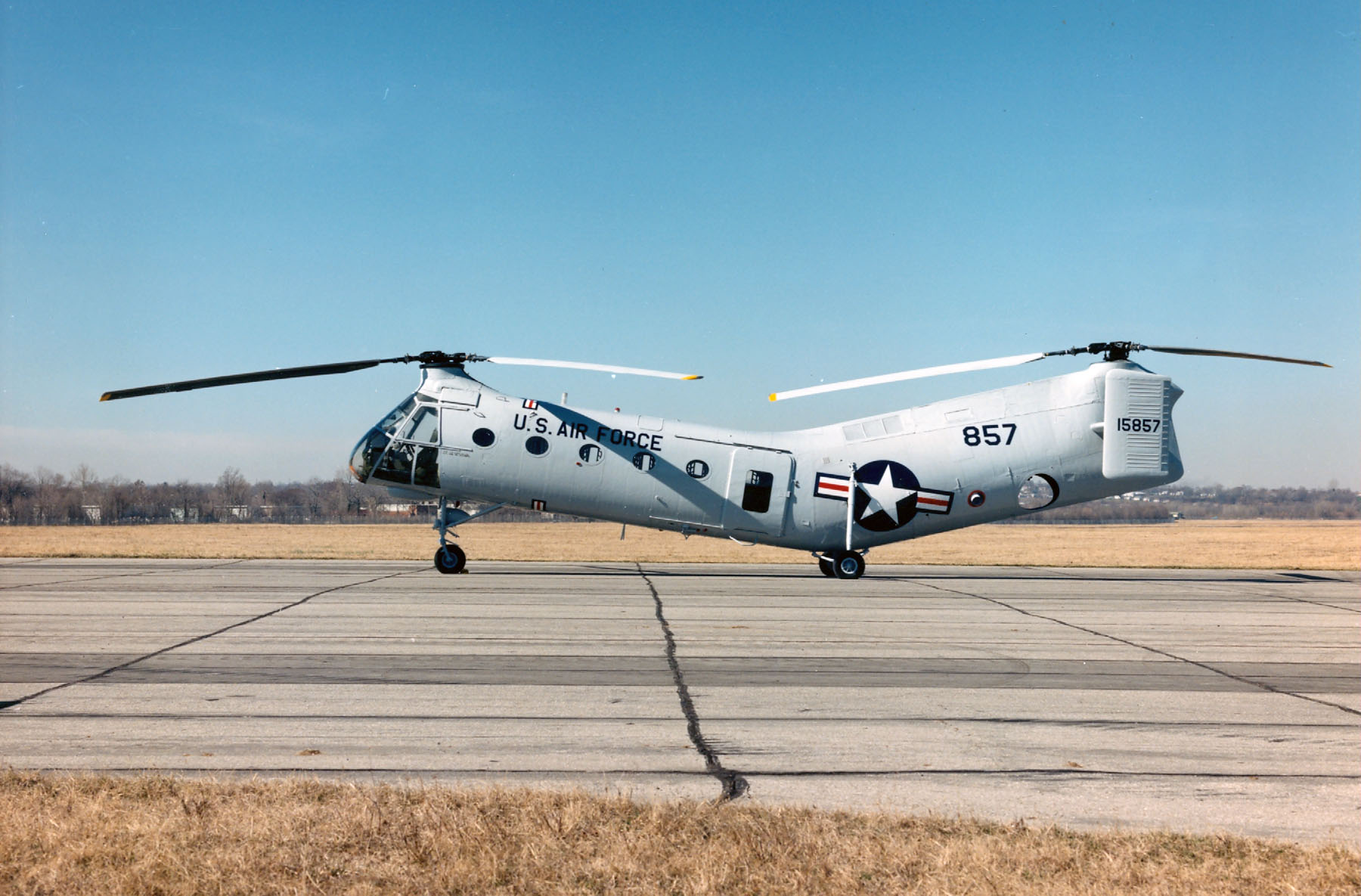
CH-21B Workhorse

In contrast, the weather reconnaissance mission had been diminishing since 1959, and was described by the Air Weather Service historian as "coming near extinction." This reduction included the 1961 inactivations of the group's 55th and 59th Squadrons, although the 56th Weather Reconnaissance Squadron at Yokota Air Base, Japan was assigned to the group in February 1960. The weather reconnaissance mission was reinstated by the Reconnaissance Panel of the Air Force Requirements Board in 1963 and Air Weather Service was designated the single manager for weather reconnaissance. In July 1961, the group moved to McClellan Air Force Base, California, where it was redesignated 9th Weather Reconnaissance Group and assumed responsibilities for Air Weather Service's worldwide reconnaissance mission. For the previous ten years weather reconnaissance units had been assigned to various headquarters.

1962 saw growth in the group's organization and mission. In January 1962, the 53rd Weather Reconnaissance Squadron, which had returned to Kindley Air Force Base, was again assigned to the group, and the 55th Weather Reconnaissance Squadron was reactivated at McClellan. Although the 53rd Squadron retained its mission of reporting on hurricanes in the Atlantic, it moved to Hunter Air Force Base, Georgia in August 1963.

The weather reconnaissance mission continued to grow, and in February the 57th Weather Reconnaissance Squadron was activated at Kirtland Air Force Base, New Mexico. In April, it was joined by the 54th Weather Reconnaissance Squadron, which was organized at Andersen Air Force Base, Guam, where it was close to the Joint Typhoon Warning Center, for reconnaissance of Pacific Ocean typhoons. The 57th moved from Kirtland to Avalon Airport, Australia in September, for reconnaissance of Indian Ocean cyclones.

1963 also saw the replacement of the 1212th Balloon Activities Squadron at Goodfellow by the reactivated 59th Weather Reconnaissance Squadron, which assumed its mission and the 58th, which was organized on 15 April 1963 at Kirtland to replace the 1211th Test Squadron. The 58th's primary mission was sampling and data collection of information regarding nuclear tests. The 59th was inactivated in May 1964 and balloon activities were transferred to Detachment 1, 6th Weather Squadron. The H-21s flown by the 59th were transferred to Air Rescue Service.

In April 1965, the group received its first Boeing C-135B Stratolifter, the first of ten that would be modified as a WC-135Bs.

=== 9th Wing ===
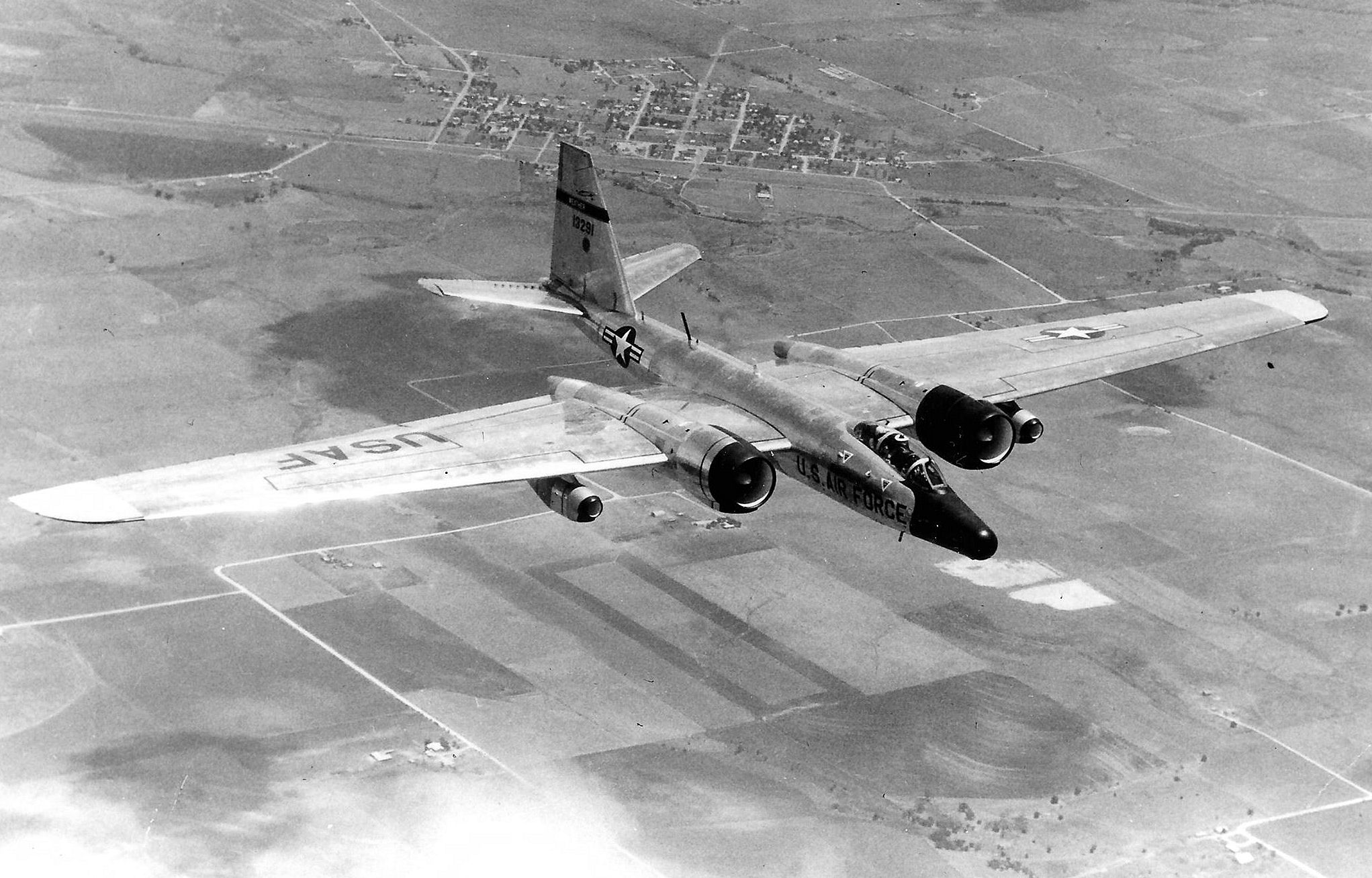
58th Squadron RB-57F (Note: Aircraft was built as Martin B-57B-MA, serial 52-1574. It was converted to RB-57F configuration by General Dynamics and assigned a new serial 63-13291. This plane was flown by the 58th Weather Reconnaissance Squadron. It was sent to the Military Aircraft Storage and Disposal Center on 30 May 1974. Dirkx, Marco (21 June 2025). "1963 USAF Serial Numbers". Joe Baugher’s Serial Number List.)

On 8 July 1965 the 9th Weather Reconnaissance Wing was activated at McClellan Air Force Base, California and assumed the mission, personnel and equipment of the 9th Weather Reconnaissance Group. The wing supported unit deployments overseas and space launches from Florida by supporting units flying along routes to provide weather data. Its squadrons flew some non-weather reconnaissance and search and rescue missions over the Arctic, Atlantic, Pacific and Indian Oceans.

In September 1965, the 57th Squadron returned to the United States from Australia, and was stationed at Hickam Air Force Base, Hawaii. In June 1966, the Hurricane Hunters of the 53rd Squadron moved closer to the area where most Atlantic hurricanes originated, relocating to Ramey Air Force Base, Puerto Rico, where it remained until Ramey closed and it moved to Keesler Air Force Base, Mississippi in July 1973.

In 1967, wing WC-130s began weather reconnaissance missions in Southeast Asia. In addition, implementing Air Weather Service's mission of weather modification, these planes engaged in rainmaking operations. The last rainmaking mission in Southeast Asia was flown on 5 July 1972. Later weather modification efforts included participation in Project Stormfury, including seeding Hurricane Ginger in 1971.

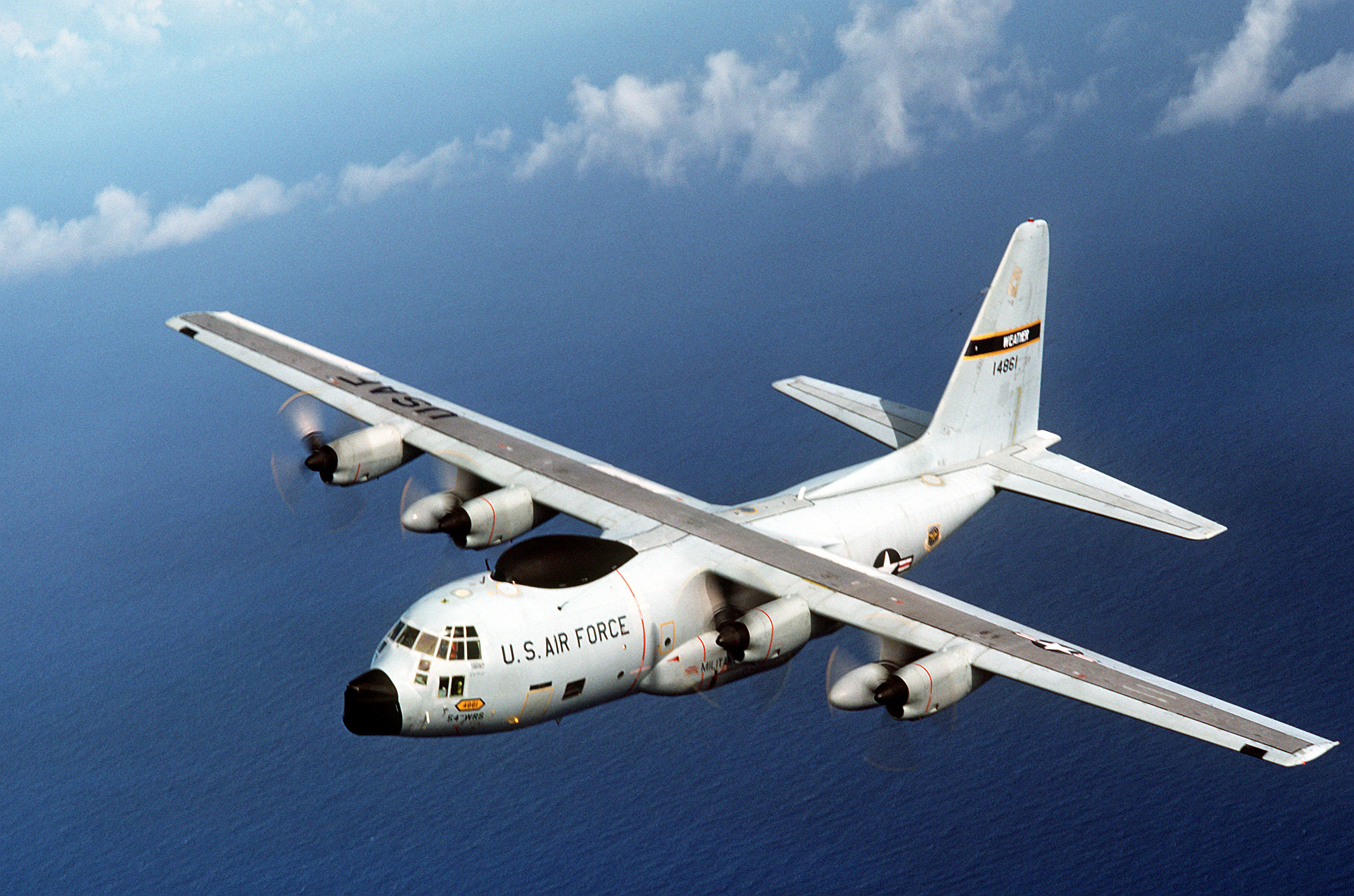
54th Squadron WC-130H (Note: Aircraft is Lockheed WC-130H-LM Hercules, serial 64-14861.)

In 1969, in a cost reduction program called Project 703, the 57th Weather Reconnaissance Squadron at Hickam was inactivated, and the wing's fleet of WB-47s were retired. That same year, Major Henry M. Dyches, Jr. was awarded the Koren Kollegian Trophy for saving a WC-135B after his controls had jammed on takeoff. Using a combination of differential use of spoilers, aircraft trim and power, Major Dyches was able to make an emergency landing, saving the plane and the lives of its nine crewmembers. (Note: "The Koren Kolligian Jr. Trophy recognizes outstanding feats of airmanship by aircrew members who by extraordinary skill, exceptional alertness, ingenuity, or proficiency, averted accidents or minimized the seriousness of the accidents in terms of injury, loss of life, aircraft damage, or property damage." No byline. "The Koren Kollegian, Jr Trophy". Air Force Safety Center Public Affairs.)

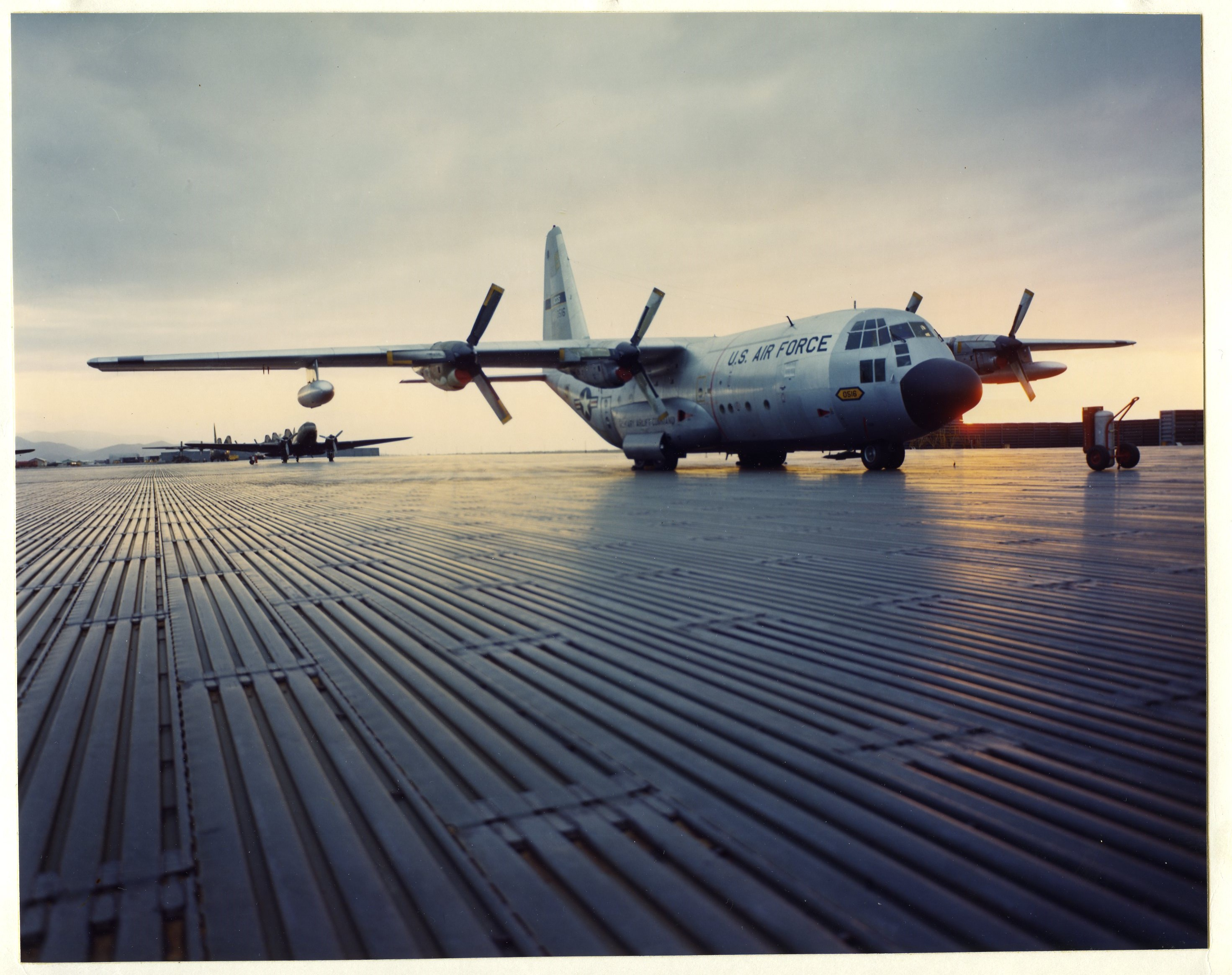
RC-130A of the 1st Aerial Cartographic and Geodetic Squadron

The wing lost another squadron in January 1972, when the 56th Weather Reconnaissance Squadron inactivated as weather reconnaissance operations from Japan ended. On 30 June 1972, the wing added the aerial mapping mission, when the 1st Aerial Cartographic and Geodetic Squadron at Forbes Air Force Base, Kansas was reassigned to the wing when Aerospace Cartographic and Geodetic Service was discontinued. In 1973, the wing's WB-57Fs were retired as the aerial sampling mission was transferred to Strategic Air Command. The transfer was completed in June 1974 and the 58th Weather Reconnaissance Squadron was inactivated the next day. 1st Squadron was inactivated in March 1974, although the photomapping mission continued until January 1975, and the wing's last RC-130A was transferred the following month.

The 9th Wing was inactivated in July 1975, when the weather reconnaissance mission was transferred to Aerospace Rescue and Recovery Service and the wing headquarters personnel, equipment and mission were transferred to the 41st Rescue and Weather Reconnaissance Wing, which assumed command of its remaining subordinate units.

== Lineage ==
9th Weather Reconnaissance Group

- Constituted as the 9th Weather Group on 31 March 1952

Activated on 20 April 1952
Redesignated 9th Weather Reconnaissance Group on 1 September 1961
Inactivated on 8 July 1965

9th Weather Reconnaissance Wing

- Constituted as the 9th Weather Reconnaissance Wing on 4 May 1965 (not organized)

Organized on 8 July 1965
Inactivated on 1 September 1975

=== Assignments ===
- Air Weather Service, 20 April 1952 - 8 July 1965
- Air Weather Service, 8 July 1965 - 1 September 1975

=== Stations ===
- Andrews Air Force Base, Maryland, 20 April 1952
- Scott Air Force Base, Illinois, 1 October 1957
- McClellan Air Force Base, California, 1 July 1961 - 8 July 1965, 8 July 1965 – 1 September 1975

=== Components ===
- 1st Aerial Cartographic and Geodetic Squadron: 30 June 1972 – 31 March 1974

Forbes Air Force Base, Kansas, 30 June 1972 (Note: Stations are listed for components not located at the same station as group or wing headquarters.)
Keesler Air Force Base, Mississippi, 19 July 1973

- 11th Consolidated Aircraft Maintenance Squadron, 1 August 1973 – 1 September 1975
- 53rd Strategic Reconnaissance Squadron, Medium, Weather (later 53rd Weather Reconnaissance Squadron): 20 April - 25 November 1953, 8 January 1962 - 8 July 1965, 8 July 1965 – 1 September 1975

Kindley Air Force Base, Bermuda, 20 April – 25 November 1953, 8 January 1962; Hunter Air Force Base, Georgia, 31 August 1963; Ramey Air Force Base, Puerto Rico, 15 June 1966; Keesler Air Force Base, Mississippi, 1 July 1973 – 1 September 1975

- 54th Weather Reconnaissance Squadron: 8 February 1962 – 8 July 1965, 8 July 1965 – 1 September 1975

Andersen Air Force Base, Guam, 8 February 1962 – 1 September 1975

- 55th Strategic Reconnaissance Squadron (later 55th Weather Reconnaissance Squadron): 20 April 1953 – 8 July 1961, 8 January 1962 – 8 July 1965, 8 July 1965 – 1 September 1975
- 56th Weather Reconnaissance Squadron: 1 February 1960 – 8 July 1965, 8 July 1965 - 15 January 1972

Yokota Air Base, Japan, 8 February 1962 – 15 January 1972

- 57th Weather Reconnaissance Squadron: 8 February 1962 – 8 July 1965, 8 July 1965 - 10 November 1969

Kirtland Air Force Base, New Mexico, 8 February 1962; Avalon Airport, Melbourne, Victoria, Australia, 30 September 1962; Hickam Air Force Base, Hawaii, 15 September 1965 – 10 November 1969

- 58th Weather Reconnaissance Squadron: 18 April – 8 August 1958, 15 April 1963 – 8 July 1965, 8 July 1965 – 1 July 1974

Kirtland Air Force Base, New Mexico

- 59th Weather Reconnaissance Squadron: 8 May 1955 – 18 March 1960, 8 July 1963 – 8 May 1964

Kindley Air Force Base, Bermuda, 8 May 1955 – 18 March 1960; Goodfellow Air Force Base, Texas, 8 July 1963 – 8 May 1964

- 1211th Test Squadron (Sampling), 7 August 1962 – 8 June 1963

Kirtland Air Force Base, New Mexico

- 1212th Balloon Activities Squadron, 1 January 1962 – 8 June 1963

Goodfellow Air Force Base, Texas

=== Aircraft ===
- Boeing WB-29A Superfortress, 1953
- Boeing WB-50D Superfortress, 1955-1965
- Boeing WB-47E Stratojet, 1957-1969
- Martin RB-57D Canberra, 1964
- General Dynamics RB-57F (later WB-57F) Canberra, 1964-1974
- Boeing WC-135 Stratotanker, 1965-1975 (Note: The first planes were received as C-135s, then later modified as WC-135s. In 1967, they were further modified with the ability to be refueled midair. Markus, et al., p. 30.)
- Lockheed RC-130A Hercules, 1973-1974
- Lockheed WC-130B Hercules, 1962-1973
- Lockheed WC-130H Hercules, 1973-1975
- Piasecki H-21 Workhorse, 1960–1963

=== Awards ===
Award streamer	Award	Dates	Notes
	Air Force Outstanding Unit Award	1 March 1960 – 28 February 1961	9th Weather Group
	Air Force Outstanding Unit Award	1 July 1967 – 30 June 1968	9th Weather Reconnaissance Wing
	Air Force Outstanding Unit Award	1 January – 31 December 1971	9th Weather Reconnaissance Wing
