= III Reconnaissance Command =

United States Army Air Forces unit

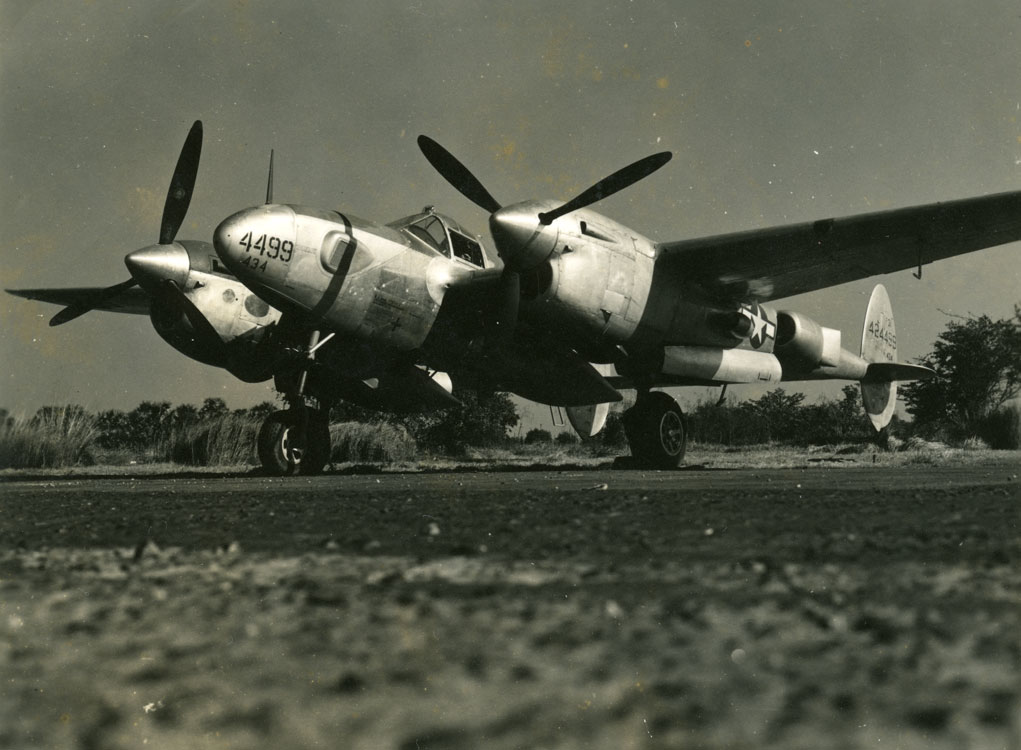
- A Lockheed F-5 Lightning as used by photographic reconnaissance units training under III Reconnaissance Commband
- Active: 1941-1946
- Country: United States
- Branch: United States Army; United States Air Force
- Role: Command of air support and reconnaissance training units

Commanders
- Notable commanders: William E. Kepner

Insignia
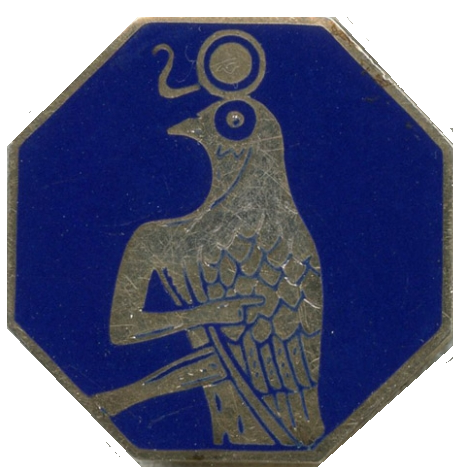
- III Reconnaissance Command Distinctive Unit Insigne (Note: Approved 23 July 1942.)

The III Reconnaissance Command is a disbanded United States Army Air Forces unit. Its last assignment was with Third Air Force stationed at Rapid City Army Air Base, South Dakota, where it was inactivated on 8 April 1946. After transferring to the United States Air Force in September 1947, it was disbanded in October 1948.

The command was organized in September 1941 as the 1st Air Support Command, an element of 1st Air Force to control light bombardment and observation units in its area of responsibility. Following the attack on Pearl Harbor, the command's units conducted antisubmarine warfare patrols off the Atlantic Coast. In August 1942, it transferred to 3rd Air Force, which had the responsibility to train air support units for the Army Air Forces (AAF) and assumed the mission of training units and aircrews for overseas deployment. In 1943, it became the I Tactical Air Division (later III Tactical Air Division) under III Tactical Air Command. In the final months of the war, it specialized in training reconnaissance units.

== History ==
=== Initial organization under 1st Air Force ===
General Headquarters Air Force (GHQ AF) reorganized its four regional air districts as Numbered Air Forces in the spring of 1941. By the fall of that year, each of these had organized as a support command and three combat commands.

In the summer of 1941 GHQ AF had decided to establish commands to direct its air support mission in each numbered air force, plus one additional command reporting directly to GHQ AF. These commands would be manned from inactivating wings, and would initially control only observation squadrons, which would be transferred from the control of the corps and divisions, although they would remain attached to these ground units. 1st Air Force organized 1st Air Support Command at Mitchel Field, New York in September 1941, drawing its personnel and equipment from the 7th Pursuit Wing, which was simultaneously inactivated.

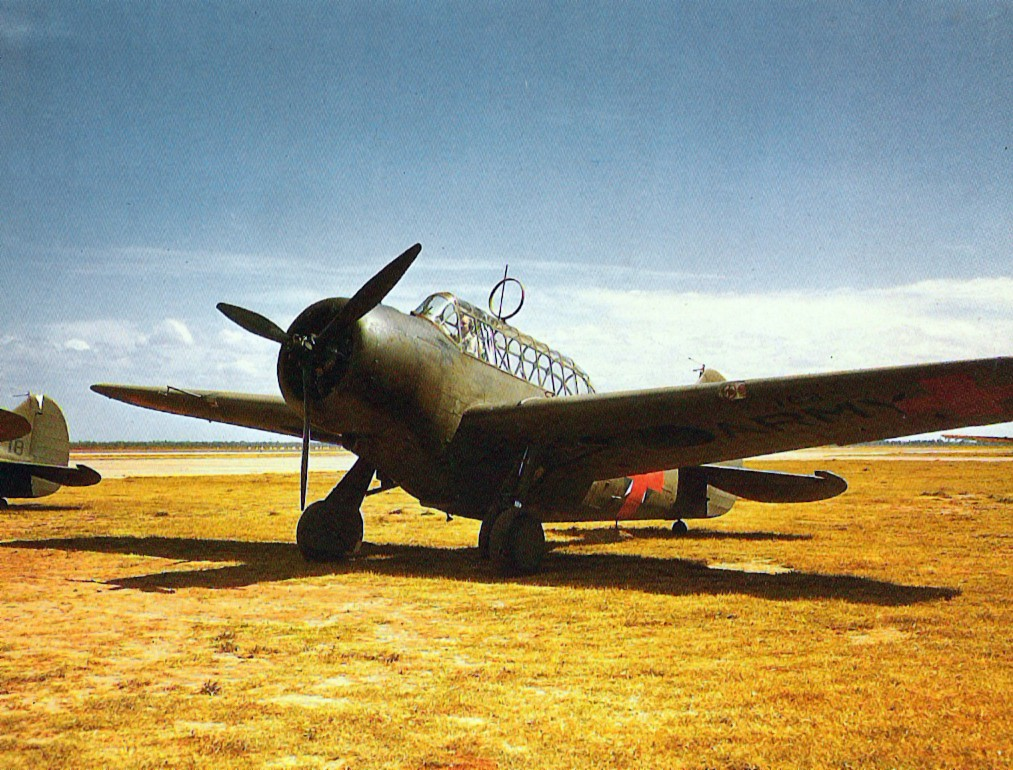
North American O-47B during the 1941 war games

New observation groups were formed, with a cadre drawn from National Guard squadrons that had been mobilized in 1940 and 1941. During the Carolina Maneuvers of 1941, the command was attached to First Army. Unlike the opposing force, the command posts of the air and ground elements were located together, and the commander of the air support command doubled as the air staff officer of the ground force commander. The opposing force command posts were separated by sixty miles, which enabled greater freedom of action and use of airpower more aggressively.

Following the attack on Pearl Harbor the command came under the control of the Eastern Theater of Operations and flew antisubmarine patrols off the east coast. However, by early 1942, the command's first commander William E. Kepner, like two of the other commanders of air support commands had moved overseas, and similar demands led GHQ AF to believe it had little more than the "remnants" of the command remaining. However, in May, the Army Air Forces (AAF) reaffirmed that each of the continental numbered air forces would have an air support command and the command's manning was brought back up. Although most of the command's observation units were withdrawn from antisubmarine operations in June 1942, the command continued limited antisubmarine patrols until 15 October 1942, when Army Air Forces Antisubmarine Command took over the mission.

=== Transfer to 3rd Air Force ===
The AAF determined that its continental air forces would specialize in their training operations and that all their air support commands would be reassigned to Third Air Force. In August 1942, the command was one of the first reassigned to Third Air Force. This was followed by a move to Morris Field, North Carolina, a base in the Third Air Force area in November 1942.

In October 1942, AAF directed that half of the observation groups assigned to the command were to be reduced to 50% strength or less with their personnel used to form new tow target squadrons, or transferred to heavy bomber Operational Training Unit (OTU)s or Replacement Training Unit (RTU)s. The command continued to train light bomber crews.

In August 1943, the command was redesignated the I Tactical Air Division with the intent that the command would engage in combined training with army ground forces. This included participation in maneuvers. The command became the III Tactical Air Division in the spring of 1944. In May 1944, the command began to specialize in training reconnaissance aircrews and organizations. In June 1945, this mission change was recognized by a change in name to III Reconnaissance Command.

After the end of the war, the command moved to Rapid City Army Air Base, South Dakota in November 1945, and was inactivated there in April 1946.

== Lineage ==
- Constituted as the 1st Air Support Command on 21 August 1941

Activated on 4 September 1941
Redesignated 1st Ground Air Support Command c. 30 April 1942
Redesignated I Air Support Command c. 18 September 1942
Redesignated I Tactical Air Division on 28 August 1943
Redesignated III Tactical Air Division c. 15 April 1944
Redesignated III Reconnaissance Command c. 1 June 1945
Inactivated on 9 April 1946
Disbanded on 8 October 1948 (Note: The command was transferred to the United States Air Force in inactive status in September 1947. The Air Force disbanded it a year later.)

=== Assignments ===
- 1st Air Force, 4 September 1941
- 3rd Air Force (later Third Air Force), 17 August 1942
- III Tactical Air Command, c. 15 April 1944
- Third Air Force, c. 1 June 1945 – 9 April 1946

=== Components ===
Groups

- 26th Observation Group: 1 September 1941 – 17 August 1942
- 45th Bombardment Group: 21 August 1941 – 5 January 1942
- 46th Bombardment Group: 10 November 1942 – 25 January 1943
- 48th Fighter-Bomber Group: attached 10 September 1943 – 14 January 1944
- 59th Observation Group: 1 September 1941 – 21 August 1942
- 69th Tactical Reconnaissance Group, 18 April 1944 – 27 March 1945
- 411th Bombardment Group: c. 15 August 1943 – 1 May 1944

Squadrons

- 1st Air Support Communications Squadron, attached, c. 8 September 1943; assigned 3 November 1943 – 31 March 1944
- 2d Balloon Squadron: 1 September 1941 – 3 February 1942 (thereafter disbanded)
- 3d Observation Squadron: 1 September 1941 – 12 March 1942 (attached to the Coast Artillery School)
- 5th Communications Squadron, Air Support (later 5th Air Support Communications Squadron): 15 May 1942 – c. 13 June 1943
- 6th Reconnaissance Squadron: 18 April – 1 October 1944
- 7th Reconnaissance Squadron: 8 November 1943 – 1 October 1944
- 9th Communications Squadron, Air Support (later 9th Air Support Communications Squadron): 21 August 1942 – c. 21 November 1943
- 14th Air Support Communications Squadron (later 14th Tactical Air Communications Squadron): 3 March 1943 – 18 April 1944
- 14th Liaison Squadron: 11 August 1943 – 4 April 1944
- 14th Tow Target Squadron: 17 December 1942 – 4 November 1943
- 18th Air Support Communications Squadron, 3 November 1943 – c. 12 February 1944
- 19th Liaison Squadron: 11 August 1943 – c. 15 April 1944
- 36th Photographic Reconnaissance Squadron: 29 March – c. November 1944
- 37th Photographic Reconnaissance Squadron: 12 April – 15 November 1944
- 39th Photographic Reconnaissance Squadron: 12 April 1944 – 6 January 1945
- 40th Photographic Reconnaissance Squadron: 18 April – 3 June 1944
- 41st Photographic Reconnaissance Squadron: 24 June – 1 October 1944; 4 December 1944 – 18 April 1945
- 57th Reconnaissance Squadron: 21 July 1945 – 25 January 1946
- 58th Reconnaissance Squadron: 21 July 1945 – 31 March 1946
- 72d Liaison Squadron: 11 August 1943 – c. 14 June 1944
- 103d Reconnaissance Squadron: 18 April 1944 – 3 June 1944
- 119th Observation Squadron: 1 September 1941 – 29 March 1942 (attached to 59th Observation Group)
- 115th Liaison Squadron: 18 April – 29 October 1944
- 121st Liaison Squadron: 11 August 1943 – c. 20 March 1944
- 127th Liaison Squadron: 11 August 1943 – 31 April 1944
- 158th Liaison Squadron: 1 March – 1 October 1944
- 162nd Liaison Squadron: 15 May – 24 June 1944
- 163rd Liaison Squadron: 15 May 44 – 20 January 1945

Base Units

- 321st AAF Base Unit (Headquarters, III Tactical Air Division [later Headquarters, III Reconnaissance Command]): 1 May 1944 – c. 1 November 1945
- 322nd AAF Base Unit (56th Bombardment Operational Training Wing, Light): 1 May 1944 – c. 1 November 1945
- 333rd AAF Base Unit (Replacement Training Unit, Light, Bombardment [later Combat Crew Training Station, Light Bombardment]): 1 May 1944 – 31 January 1945http://www.airforcehistoryindex.org/data/000/175/854.xml
- 334th AAF Base Unit (Replacement Training Unit, Light, Bombardment [later Combat Crew Training Station, Light Bombardment]): 1 May – 1 October 1944
- 347th AAF Base Unit (Combat Crew Training Station, Tactical Reconnaissance): c. 1 June 1945 – c. 28 March 1946
- 348th AAF Base Unit (Combat Crew Training Station, Photographic Reconnaissance): c. 1 June 1945 – 29 December 1944
- 349th AAF Base Unit (Combat Crew Training Station, Liaison): c. 1 June 1945 – c. 7 November 1945
- 353rd AAF Base Unit (Maneuver Station): 1 May 1944 – c. 31 January 1946
- 379th AAF Base Unit (Combat Crew Training Station, Tactical Reconnaissance): c. 1 June 1945 – 1945

=== Stations ===
- Mitchel Field, New York, 4 September 1941
- Morris Field, North Carolina, c. 10 November 1942
- Key Field, Mississippi, c. 3 April 1944
- Rapid City Army Air Base, South Dakota, November 1945 – 9 April 1946

=== Campaign ===
Campaign Streamer	Campaign	Dates	Notes
	Antisubmarine	7 December 1941 – 1 August 1943	1st Air Support Command (later 1st Ground Air Support Command, I Air Support Command)
	American Theater without inscription	1 August 1943 – 2 March 1946	I Air Support Command (later I Tactical Air Division, III Tactical Air Division, III Reconnaissance Command)
