= 16th Electronic Warfare Squadron =

16th Electronic Warfare Squadron
- Active: 1917–1919; 1921–1945; 1947–1949; 1993–present
- Country: United States
- Branch: United States Air Force
- Type: Test and evaluation
- Part of: Air Combat Command
- Garrison/HQ: Eglin AFB
- Engagements: Mediterranean Theater of Operations; European Theater of Operations
- Decorations: Distinguished Unit Citation

Commanders
- Notable commanders: Major General Clarence L. Tinker (1922-1924) General of the Air Force Henry H. Arnold (1926–28)

Insignia
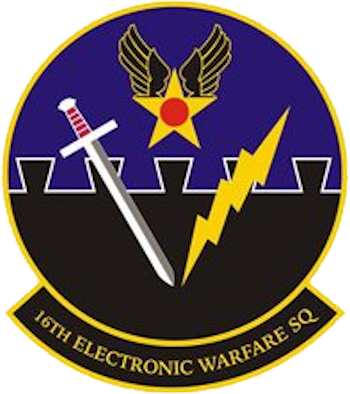
- 16th Electronic Warfare Squadron emblem

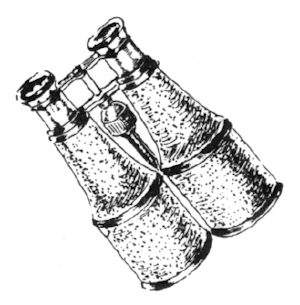
- 16th Observation Squadron emblem (Note: Approved 1 April 1924. Maurer, Combat Squadrons, pp. 90-92.)

The 16th Electronic Warfare Squadron is an active United States Air Force unit. It is assigned to the 350th Spectrum Warfare Group at Eglin Air Force Base, Florida. The squadron began as the 16th Aero Squadron and redesignated several times over its history.

The 16th Aero Squadron, a World War I squadron that provided maintenance support for aeronautical units on the Western Front.

The 16th Reconnaissance Squadron, which served during the years between the World Wars as an observation squadron, with its flights located with various Army schools. During World War II, the squadron served in the Mediterranean, where it was awarded a Distinguished Unit Citation for its performance from October 1943 to January 1944.

The 16th Photographic Reconnaissance Squadron, which served as a long range photographic unit during the early years of the Cold War.

== Mission ==
The 16th Electronic Warfare Squadron (EWS) provides electronic warfare test facilities for mission data and electronic warfare systems test and evaluation. Its personnel assess the maintainability, reliability, suitability, and readiness of electronic warfare systems and support equipment, and perform test and evaluation of new concepts for electronic warfare systems. They also monitor developmental testing conducted by acquisition agencies. The 16th EWS develops, fabricates and maintains test instrumentation and performs acceptance tests of all new electronic warfare related hardware and software and supports training for maintenance and operational units worldwide. The 16th EWS has more than $450 million in assets, including eight system integration laboratories and five mobile test facilities.

== History ==
The squadron was originally established as an Air Service flying training unit in May 1917, conducting flying training for air cadets in the Midwest throughout the summer. It deployed to France in January 1918, becoming an aircraft maintenance organization in rear areas of the Western Front. It remained in France until May 1919 when squadron returned to the United States and demobilized.

The 16th Squadron was established in 1921 as an observation squadron, attached to Army ground units throughout the 1920s and 1930s. It was consolidated with its predecessor in 1924. The 16th carried mail and performed fire observation duties, included carrying mail to President Calvin Coolidge vacationing in South Dakota and Wisconsin in August and September 1927, and June to September 1928.

After the Attack on Pearl Harbor the squadron was reassigned to antisubmarine duties along the southeast coast in late 1941, early 1942. It deployed to the European Theater of Operations, where it was attached to the Royal Air Force reconnaissance school at RAF Wattisham, England in late 1942. While in England, the air echelon received modern Lockheed P-38 long-range photo-reconnaissance aircraft and joined the ground personnel in French Morocco shortly after the Operation Torch invasion in November 1942.

The squadron was assigned to Twelfth Air Force and engaged in long range intelligence gathering and aerial mapping of Algeria and Tunisia, supporting the United States Fifth Army during the North African and Tunisian Campaigns. After the retreat of Axis forces from Tunisia in mid-1942, performed antisubmarine patrols over the Mediterranean Sea and also functioned as in in-theater training unit for aerial reconnaissance pilots.

Beginning in September 1943, the squadron received specially-equipped B-17 Flying Fortress heavy bombers equipped with radar detection and electronic countermeasures (ECM) equipment. It performed ECM overflights of enemy territory in advance of Fifteenth Air Force heavy bomber formations, jamming enemy Radar and generating false returns to confuse defensive forces. It also continued to fly long range reconnaissance with B-25 Mitchell medium bombers fitted with aerial cameras.. The Squadron returned to the United States in November 1944 as the need for the unit dissipated as enemy forces were driven out of the Mediterranean Theater of Operations. It was inactivated in April 1945.

The 16th Photographic Reconnaissance Squadron served with Strategic Air Command as a long-range reconnaissance unit early in the Cold War. Its mission was absorbed by the 91st Strategic Reconnaissance Wing in 1949. In 1985, it was consolidated with its predecessors, but remained inactive until 1993, when it assumed its present mission.

== Lineage ==
16th Aero Squadron

- Organized as 3d Aviation School Squadron on 9 May 1917

Redesignated 16th Aero Squadron (Construction) on 31 Aug 1917
Redesignated 16th Aero Squadron (Repair) 1918
Demobilized on 22 May 1919

16th Reconnaissance Squadron

- Authorized as 16th Squadron (Observation) on 30 August 1921

Organized on 7 December 1921
Redesignated 16th Observation Squadron (Corps and Army) on 25 January 1923

- Consolidated with 16th Aero Squadron on 8 April 1924

Inactivated on 15 March 1931

- Activated on 1 Jun 1937

Redesignated 16th Observation Squadron (Medium) on 13 Jan 1942
Redesignated 16th Observation Squadron on 4 Jul 1942
Redesignated 16th Reconnaissance Squadron (Bomber) on 31 May 1943
Redesignated 16th Reconnaissance Squadron, Heavy (Special) on 12 May 1944
Disbanded on 12 Apr 1945

- Reconstituted on 19 September 1985 and consolidated with 16th Photographic Reconnaissance Squadron as 16th Tactical Electronic Warfare Squadron

16th Photographic Reconnaissance Squadron

- Constituted as 16th Photographic Reconnaissance Squadron (Special) 1947

Activated on 16 December 1947
Inactivated on 1 June 1949

- Consolidated on 19 September 1985 with 16th Reconnaissance Squadron as 16th Tactical Electronic Warfare Squadron

16th Electronic Warfare Squadron

- Formed on 19 September 1985 by consolidation of 16th Reconnaissance Squadron and 16th Photographic Reconnaissance Squadron
- Redesignated 16th Test Squadron

Activated on 15 April 1993.
Redesignated 16th Electronic Warfare Squadron 13 September 1999

=== Assignments ===
- Unknown, 9 May 1917 – Jan 1918
- Second Aviation Instruction Center, Jan 1918 – Feb 1919; Feb-22 May 1919
- Seventh Corps Area (attached to Cavalry School), 7 December 1921
- 7th Division, 24 March 1923 (remained attached to Cavalry School)
- 2nd Cavalry Division, 15 August 1927 (remained attached to Cavalry School)
- 12th Observation Group (remained attached to Cavalry School), 1 October 1930 – 15 March 1931
- Fourth Corps Area, 1 June 1937 (B Flight attached, later assigned, to Infantry School until 20 November 1940)
- 44th Observation Group, 17 June 1937
- 32d Observation Group, 1 January 1938
- Armored Force, 3 October 1940 (attached to 2nd Armored Division after 15 November 1940)
- 73d Observation Group, 1 September 1941 (attached to 68th Observation Group from Feb 1942)
- HQ Army Air Forces, 12 March 1942
- 68th Observation Group (later Reconnaissance Group, Tactical Reconnaissance Group), 29 March 1942 (attached to XII Air Force Service Command, 25 September 1943; Twelfth Air Force, 1 Jan 1944; Fifteenth Air Force, 18 Feb 1944; Army Air Forces, Mediterranean Theater of Operations, 27 March 1944; Northwest African Air Forces, 20 September 1943; Mediterranean Allied Air Forces, 10 December 1943; Mediterranean Theater of Operations, 1 January 1944 – 26 May 1944
- Army Air Forces, Mediterranean Theater of Operations, 26 May 1944
- Hq, Army Air Forces, 3 November 1944 – 12 April 1945 (attached to 311th Photographic Wing after 21 November 1944)
- 311th Reconnaissance Wing (later 311th Air Division), 16 December 1947 – 1 June 1949 (attached to 91st Strategic Reconnaissance Wing, 10 November 1948 – 1 June 1949)
- 68th Electronic Warfare Group, 15 April 1993
- 53d Electronic Warfare Group, 10 November 1998
- 350th Spectrum Warfare Group, 25 June 2021 – present

=== Stations ===
- Memphis Airdrome, Tennessee, 9 May 1917
- Chicago Air Park, Illinois, 20 May 1917
- Chanute Field, Illinois, c. 12 Jul 1917
- Garden City, New York, New York, 4 Nov-4 Dec 1917
- St Maixent, France, a Jan 1918
- Tours, France, 24 Jan 1918
- St Gervais, Gironde, France, c. 12 Feb 1919
- Bordeaux, France, 17–23 Apr 1919
- Mitchel Field, New York, c. 7–22 May 1919
- Fort Riley, Kansas, 7 Dec 1921 – 15 Mar 1931

Detachment operated between: North Platte Airport, Nebraska, and Rapid City Airfield, South Dakota, 1 Aug–Sep 1927
Detachment operated between: Chicago Municipal Airport, Illinois, and Superior Airport, Wisconsin, Jun-14 Sep 1928

- Pope Field, North Carolina (flight at Lawson Field, Georgia), 1 Jun 1937
- Lawson Field, Georgia, 24 Oct 1940
- Daniel Field, Georgia, 9 Feb 1942
- Greensboro Airport, North Carolina, 7 Jul 1942
- Morris Field, North Carolina, 15 Aug 1942
- Langley Field, Virginia, 3–23 Oct 1942

Detachment at RAF Wattisham (AAF-377), England, c. 5–21 Oct 1942

- Fedala, French Morocco, 9 Nov 1942 (Ground echelon)
- Casablanca-Anfa Airport, French Morocco, 12 Nov 1942
- Angads Airport, Oujda, French Morocco, 30 Dec 1942
- Berrechid Airfield, French Morocco, 24 Mar 1943
- Berteaux Airfield, Algeria, 6 Sep 1943
- Foch Field, Tunisia, 26 Sep 1943

Detachments operated intermittently from several points in Italy and adjacent islands during period Oct 1943 – Mar 1944
Operated primarily from Foggia Airfield, Italy, after 28 Mar 1944

- Foggia Airfield, Italy, 3 May-30 Oct 1944

Detachment operated from Poretta Airfield, Corsica, until Sep 1944

- Bradley Field, Connecticut, 20 Nov 1944
- Buckley Field, Colorado, 1 Dec 1944 – 12 Apr 1945
- MacDill Air Force Base, Florida, 16 December 1947
- McGuire Air Force Base, New Jersey, 16 August 1948 – 1 June 1949
- Eglin Air Force Base, Florida, 15 April 1993 – present

=== Aircraft ===
- JN-4, 1917
- DH-4, c. 1922–1926,
- O–2, 1926-1930
- JNS-1, O-1, and apparently JN-4 and JN-6, 1921–1930
- O-25, 1930–1931
- O-46, 1937-C. 1939, O-47, 1938–1942, and O-49, 1941–1942
- YG-1, and O-43, 1937–1940
- O-51 and O-9, 1940–1941
- DB-7, L-4, P-40, and P-43, 1942
- A-20 and P-39, 1942–1943
- P-38, P-39, P-40, and Spitfire, 1943
- B-17, 1943–1944
- B-25, 1945
