= 58th Weather Reconnaissance Squadron =

58th Reconnaissance Squadron
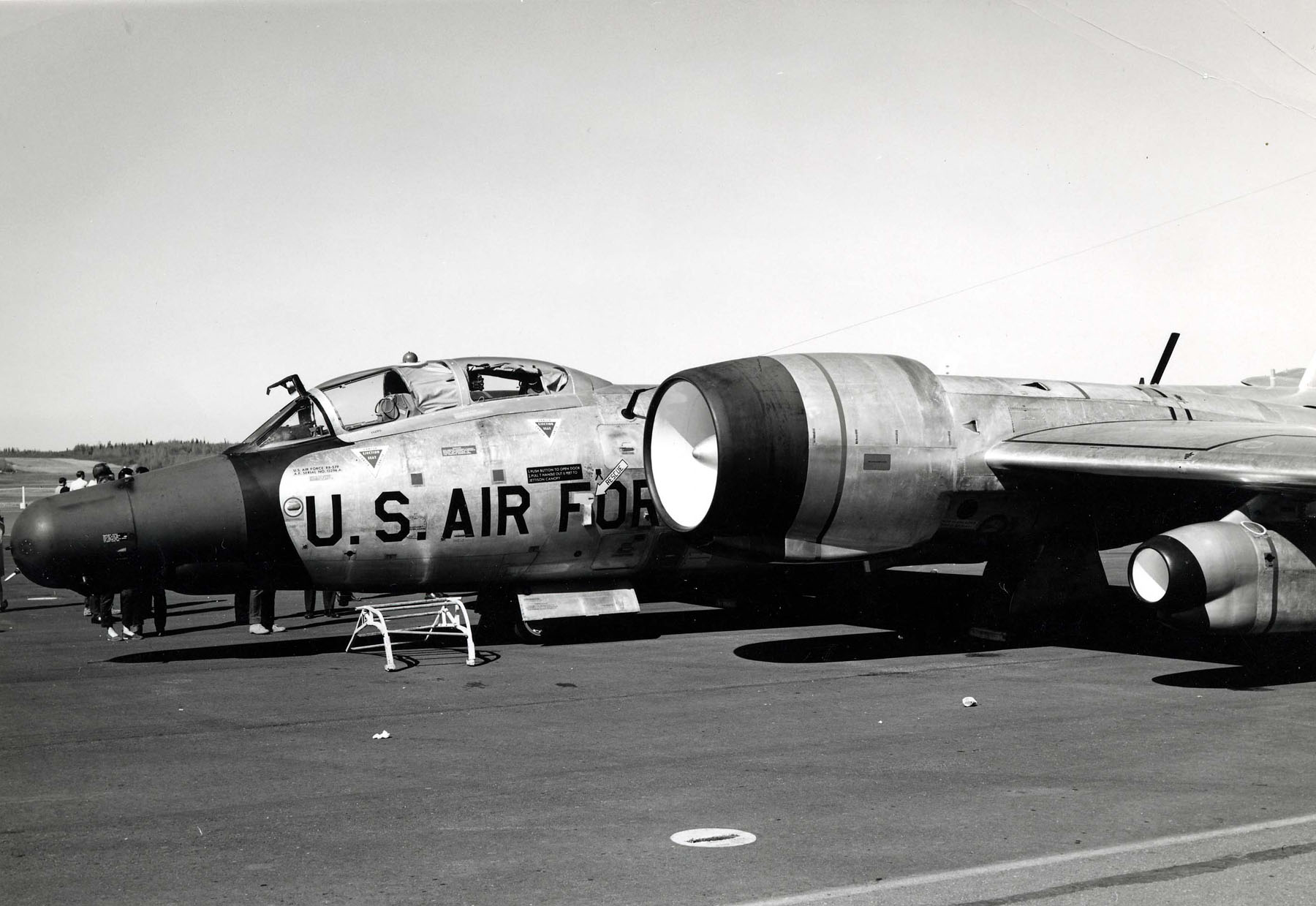
- WB-57F of the 58th Weather Reconnaissance Squadron
- Active: 1943–1946; 1951-1958; 1963-1974
- Country: United States
- Branch: United States Air Force
- Role: Reconnaissance
- Part of: Air Weather Service

Insignia
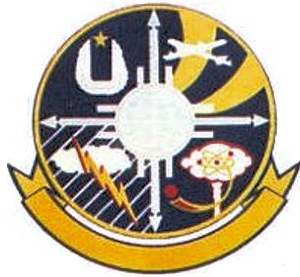
- 58th Weather Reconnaissance Squadron emblem (approved 26 July 1965)

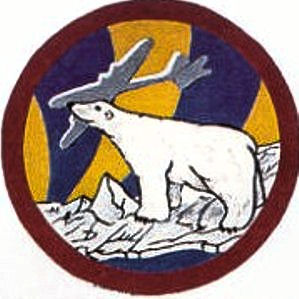
- 58th Strategic Reconnaissance Squadron emblem (approved 18 January 1952)

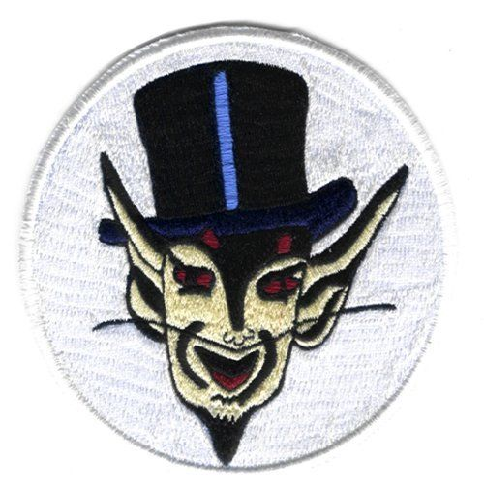
- 400th Fighter Squadron emblem (approved 12 January 1944)

The 58th Reconnaissance Squadron is an inactive United States Air Force squadron. Its last was assigned to the 9th Weather Reconnaissance Wing at Kirtland Air Force Base, New Mexico, where it was inactivated in 1974.

== History ==
Activated as the 400th Fighter Squadron in early 1943 under Fourth Air Force; spent World War II in the United States as an Operational Training Unit (OTU), initially equipped with P-39 Airacobras for advanced fighter training. Reassigned to Third Air Force in 1944, becoming a Replacement Training Unit (RTU) for A-36 Apache fighter-dive bomber ground attack aircraft.

Reassigned to Stuttgart AAB, Arkansas in 1945 and redesignated as the 58th Reconnaissance Squadron (Weather), a long-range strategic weather reconnaissance squadron, training with B-25 Mitchells and long-ranger P-61C Black Widow Night Fighters modified for weather reconnaissance missions. Reassigned to Rapid City AAB, South Dakota in late 1945, using P-61Cs as part of a NACA/Air Weather Service Thunderstorm Project to learn more about thunderstorms and to use this knowledge to better protect civil and military airplanes that operated in their vicinity. The P-61's radar and particular flight characteristics enabled it to find and penetrate the most turbulent regions of a storm, and return crew and instruments intact for detailed study. Inactivated in 1946 as part of the general demobilization of the AAF.

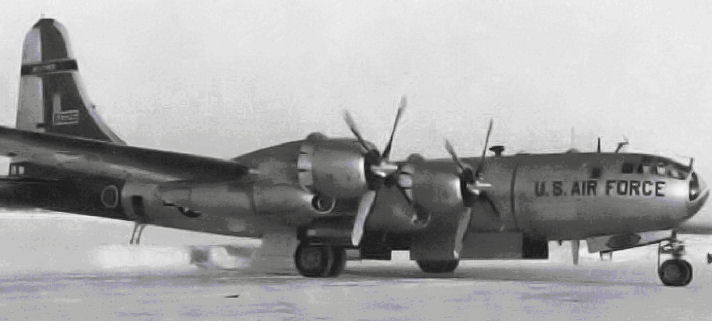
WB-50 of the 58th Weather Squadron, Elelson AFB, Alaska

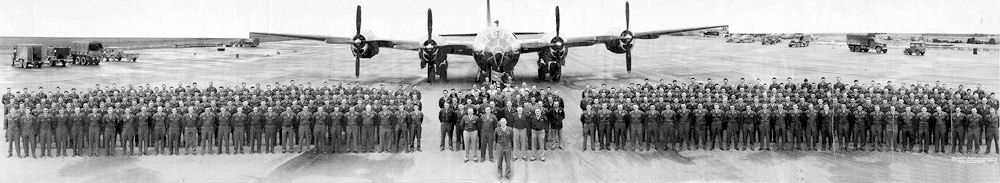
WB-50 and personnel of the 58th Strategic Reconnaissance Squadron in 1951

Reactivated as part of Strategic Air Command in 1951 in Alaska, Equipped with very long range WB-29 Superfortresses 1951, upgrading to extended long-range WB-50D Superfortresses in 1956. Conducted long-range weather flights over the Arctic and along the northern periphery of the Soviet Union; the aircraft being equipped with sensors for detecting radioactive debris to gather evidence when the Soviets tested nuclear devices. Inactivated in 1958 as part of the phaseout of the WB-50s from SAC and development of faster jet aircraft for the long-range intelligence mission.

The squadron was reactivated in 1963 at Kirtland Air Force Base, New Mexico, assuming the assets of the discontinued 1211th Test Squadron. The squadron was equipped with twelve RB-57F Canberra (later WB-57F) reconnaissance aircraft. Most of the RB-57Fs were converted B-57Ds (a few were B-57Bs) equipped with two TF33 engines in place of the B-57B's J65, plus a pair of auxiliary J60s for high altitude and long range reconnaissance. Part of their duties involved high-altitude atmospheric sampling and radiation detection work in support of nuclear test monitoring. Over the next decade the RB-57Fs were flown on a worldwide basis at very high altitudes at high speeds. Stress cracks began appearing in the wing spars and ribs of the RB-57Fs after a few years of service. Some were sent to General Dynamics for repairs. Due to the excessive cost of repairing all the aircraft, nine were placed in storage at Davis-Monthan Air Force Base, Arizona, in 1972.

The 58th WRS, the last squadron in the Air Force to use the WB-57F Canberra, was inactivated on July 1, 1974, after placing its planes in storage at Davis-Monthan.

== Lineage ==
- Constituted as the 400th Fighter Squadron on 26 May 1943

Activated on 1 August 1943
Redesignated 400th Fighter-Bomber Squadron on 5 April 1944
Redesignated 400th Fighter Squadron on 5 June 1944
Redesignated 58th Reconnaissance Squadron (Weather) on 7 July 1945
Inactivated on 31 May 1946

- Redesignated 58th Strategic Reconnaissance Squadron, Medium, Weather on 22 January 1951

Activated on 21 February 1951
Redesignated 58th Weather Reconnaissance Squadron on 15 February 1954
Inactivated on 8 August 1958

- Activated in 1963 (not organized)
- Organized on 8 June 1963

Inactivated on 30 June 1974

=== Assignments ===
- 369th Fighter Group, 1 August 1943
- Third Air Force, 7 July 1945
- III Reconnaissance Command, 21 July 1945

Fifteenth Air Force, 31 March 1946 – 31 May 1946

- 2107th Air Weather Group, 21 February 1951
- 7th Weather Group, 20 April 1952
- 9th Weather Group, 18 April 1958 – 8 August 1958
- 9th Weather Reconnaissance Group, 8 June 1963
- 9th Weather Reconnaissance Wing, 8 July 1965 - 1 July 1974

=== Stations ===
- Hamilton Field, California, 1 August 1943
- Oroville Army Air Field, California, 2 November 1943
- Hamilton Field, California, 16 March 1944
- DeRidder Army Air Base Louisiana, 28 March 1944
- Stuttgart Army Air Field, Arkansas, 8 February 1945
- Will Rogers Field, Oklahoma, 21 July 1945
- Rapid City Army Air Field, South Dakota, 28 July 1945 – 31 May 1946
- Eielson Air Force Base, Alaska, 21 February 1951 – 8 August 1958
- Kirtland Air Force Base, New Mexico, 8 June 1963 - 30 June 1974

=== Aircraft Assigned ===
- Bell P-39 Airacobra, 1943–1944
- North American A-36 Apache, 1944
- Curtiss P-40 Warhawk, 1944–1945
- North American B-25 Mitchell, 1945–1946
- Northrop P-61 Black Widow, 1945–1946
- Boeing WB-29 Superfortress, 1951–1956
- Boeing WB-50 Superfortress, 1956–1958
- Martin RB-57F (later WB-57F) Canberra, 1964–1974

=== Crash and notable events ===
- 25 September 1953 – A 58th SRS WB-29-100BW (45-21872A) crashed just after takeoff two miles north of Eielson Air Force Base. Captain Charles F. Baker, a weather observer assigned to the unit, was the only fatality.
- 31 August 1956 – A 58th Reconnaissance Squadron WB-50D (49-315), recently dubbed the "Golden Heart" in honor of the city of Fairbanks, crashed into the Susitna River near Willow. All eleven aboard died.
- 17 January 1957 – A WB-50D (48-093) assigned to the 58th Weather Reconnaissance Squadron crashed shortly after takeoff approximately three miles north of Eielson Air Force Base. All 12 crew members were killed.
