= List of United States Air Force weather squadrons =

The United States Air Force has several types of weather squadrons.

== Weather, Combat Weather, and Expeditionary Combat Weather Squadrons ==
Squadron	Shield	Location	Notes
1st Combat Weather Squadron		Fort Lewis	
2d Weather Squadron		Offutt AFB	
3d Combat Weather Squadron		Fort Hood	Aligned with the III Armored Corps, (US Army)
4th Weather Squadron		Maxwell AFB	
5th Weather Squadron			Units active during Vietnam War
6th Weather Squadron (Mobile)		Tinker AFB	
7th Combat Weather Squadron & 7th Expeditionary Combat Weather Squadron		Lucius D. Clay Kaserne	Inactivated 2021; replaced by 13th Expeditionary Combat Weather Squadron
8th Weather Squadron			
9th Weather Squadron		Shaw AFB	Reactivated as 9th Operational Weather Squadron
10th Weather Squadron		Hurlburt Field	Redesignated 10th Combat Weather Squadron on 1 April 1996; inactivated 16 May 2014
11th Weather Squadron			
12th Weather Squadron			
13th Expeditionary Combat Weather Squadron			Redesignated from 13th Weather Squadron and reactivated in 2021.
13th Weather Squadron			Inactivated in 1951.
14th Weather Squadron		Asheville, North Carolina	
15th Weather Squadron			
16th Weather Squadron		Offutt AFB	
17th Weather Squadron		Hickam AFB	Redesignated 17 OWS
18th Combat Weather Squadron		Fort Bragg, North Carolina	The One-Eight. Aligned with the XVIII Airborne Corps. (US Army)
Detachment 1		Fort Drum, NY	
Detachment 2		Fort Johnson, LA	
Detachment 3		Hunter Army Airfield, GA	
Detachment 4		Fort Campbell, KY	
Operating Location - B		Fort Belvoir, VA	
Operating Location - C		Fort Novosel, AL	
Operating Location - Q		Fort Knox, KY	
19th Expeditionary Weather Squadron		Afghanistan	See 504th Expeditionary Air Support Operations Group
20th Weather Squadron			
21st Weather Squadron		Kapaun Air Station	
23d Weather Squadron			
24th Weather Squadron		Webb AFB (closed)	
25th Weather Squadron			
26th Weather Squadron		Barksdale AFB	
28th Weather Squadron			
29th Weather Squadron			
30th Weather Squadron		Vandenberg AFB, California	HQ at Tan Son Nhut AB, South Vietnam during war
31st Weather Squadron		former Sembach AB	USAFE stations under 2nd Weather Wing
32d Weather Squadron			
33d Weather Squadron			
35th Weather Squadron			
45th Weather Squadron		Patrick Space Force Base	Performs weather assessments for rocket launches at Kennedy Space Center. Transferred to Space Force.
46th Weather Squadron		Eglin AFB, Florida	
88th Weather Squadron		Wright-Patterson AFB, Ohio	
607th Weather Squadron		Camp Humphreys, South Korea	

== Operational Weather Squadrons ==
Squadron	Shield	Location	Nickname	Notes
9th Operational Weather Squadron		Shaw AFB		The 9 OWS inactivated on 31 May 2008 and merged with the 26th Operational Weather Squadron located on Barksdale AFB, Louisiana.
11th Operational Weather Squadron		Elmendorf AFB		Inactivated on 13 June 2008; operations consolidated with 17th OWS
15th Operational Weather Squadron		Scott AFB	"Thunderbolts"	
17th Operational Weather Squadron		Hickam AFB	"Fighting Geckos"	
20th Operational Weather Squadron		Yokota AB	"Samurais"	Inactivated April 2006; operations consolidated with 17th OWS
21st Operational Weather Squadron		Kapaun Air Station	"Knights"	
25th Operational Weather Squadron		Davis–Monthan AFB	"Bobcats"	
26th Operational Weather Squadron		Barksdale AFB	"Bayou Bandits"	
28th Operational Weather Squadron		Shaw AFB	"Cobras"	

== Miscellaneous Weather Squadrons ==
Squadron	Shield	Location	Notes
Air Force Operations Group		Pentagon	
10th Combat Weather Squadron			
20th Air Weather Squadron			
54th Strategic Reconnaissance Squadron			
55th Space Weather Squadron			
56th Strategic Reconnaissance Squadron			
57th Strategic Reconnaissance Squadron			
58th Strategic Reconnaissance Squadron			
59th Strategic Reconnaissance Squadron			
2150th Air Weather Squadron			

== See also ==
- List of United States Air Force squadrons
