= 15th Operational Weather Squadron =

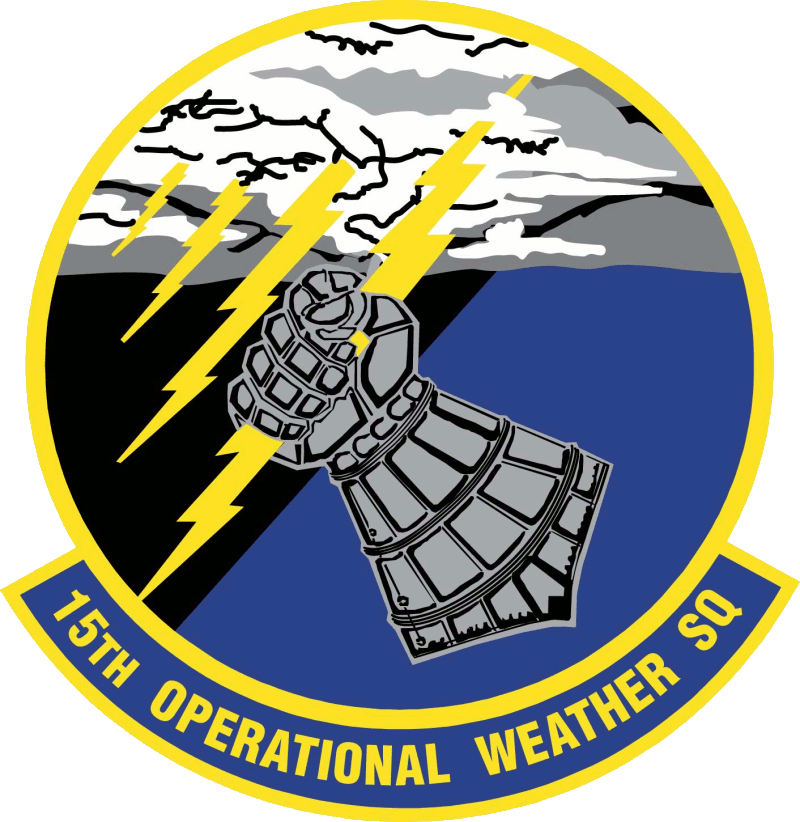
- Active: 1999 – present
- Country: United States
- Type: Squadron
- Garrison/HQ: Scott Air Force Base
- March: Thunderstruck by AC/DC

The 15th Operational Weather Squadron (15 OWS), based out of Scott Air Force Base, IL, is the largest Operational Weather Squadron in the Continental United States that does not have an overseas mission.

== Goal ==
Its goal is to provide accurate weather information to support military operations.

== Mission ==
The 15th Operational Weather Squadron is responsible for producing and disseminating mission planning and execution weather analysis, forecasts, and briefings for Air Force, Army, Navy, Marines, Guard, Reserve, United States Strategic Command, and United States Northern Command forces operating at 137 installations/sites in a 24 state region of the northeastern United States, totaling over $200 Billion of assets and over 270,000 personnel including presidential support.

This weather squadron is responsible for base or post forecasting, developing weather products, briefing transient aircrews, and weather warnings for all of their geographical units. Using automatic observing systems located at all military installations and communicating with their combat weather flights, the squadron is able to 'watch' the weather in their entire area of responsibility from one central location.

The Operational Weather Squadron is the first place a newly schooled weather apprentice will report. At the squadron, working alongside a seasoned weather professional, the forecaster is trained in all aspects of Air force meteorology, from forecasting to pilot briefing. The 15th Operational Weather Squadron is responsible for training 20% of all new Air Force enlisted forecasters and weather officers.

The weather squadron works closely with the combat weather flights they support to ensure a flawless exchange of weather information; to Andrews Air Force Base, Camp David, Dover Air Force Base, Ellsworth Air Force Base, Fort Belvoir, Fort Campbell, Fort Drum, Fort Eustis, Fort Knox, Grand Forks Air Force Base, Grissom Air Reserve Base, Langley Air Force Base, McGuire Air Force Base, Minot Air Force Base, Offutt Air Force Base, Scott Air Force Base, Selfridge Air National Guard Base, Westover ARB, and Wright-Patterson Air Force Base.

== Personnel and resources ==
15th Operational Weather Squadron's manning consists of active duty, reserve, civilian and contract personnel and is located on Scott Air Force Base, IL., Under the 1st Weather Group, Offutt Air Force Base, NE.

== Organization ==
The 15th Operational Weather Squadron is divided into 5 different flights, Alpha, Bravo, Charlie, Sierra and Tango. These 5 flights correspond to a specific Area of Operation(AoR), A, B and C flights (WXA, WXB, WXC) are responsible for the Active, and Reserve air stations and specific Army installations. TO (WXTO) Flight is responsible for Briefing pilots using a common DD Form 175-1, and Air Crew Graphics produce graphic charts. T Flight (WXT) is responsible for training and communications within the 15OWS.

A, B, and C Flight are responsible for the 17 active/reserve bases and 230 Department of Defense units at 144 installations across 24 states. Operations continue 24hour, 7-day-a-week and are divided into 4 cells: West, Central, East and PWW (Point Weather Warning).

X Flight is responsible for producing DD Form 175-1’s that are faxed or e-mailed to 151 flying units across the 24 state AoR, that produces a total of 2500 briefings per month. The Air Crew Graphics section of WXX produce graphic charts or "Forecaster in the loop" charts (FITL charts). This section produce Thunderstorms, Turbulence, Icing, Horizontal Weather depiction (HWD) or Fog forecast, Clouds, and Surface Precipitation charts comparable to the National Weather Service's AIRMETS and SIGMETS.

S Flight (WXS), otherwise known as the Communications Shop, is responsible for maintaining all 39 servers and 196 workstations of the 15th OWS.

T Flight (WXT) is responsible for training new forecasters.

== Lineage ==
Constituted 15th Weather Squadron on 10 April 1942;

Activated on 22 April 1942;
Inactivated on 8 August 1959;
Activated on 28 February 1961;
Organized on 8 July 1961;
Inactivated on 30 September 1991;
Activated on 1 June 1992;
Inactivated on 1 August 1994;

Redesignated 15th Operational Weather Squadron on 8 January 1999;

Activated on 15 February 1999.

== Duty Assignments ==
List of duty assignments and parent units from 1942 to present.

1. McClellan Field, Sacramento Air Depot, California, 22 April 1942 – 16 June 1942
2. Melbourne, Allied Air Forces Australia, 16 July 1942 – 2 September 1942
3. Melbourne, Fifth Air Force, 2 September 1942 – 8 November 1942
4. Townsville, Queensland, Fifth Air Force, 8 November 1942 – 25 October 1944
5. Townsville, Queensland, FEAF Regional Control and Weather Group (Provisional), 25 October 1944 – 20 September 1945
6. Townsville, Queensland, 1st Weather Group, 20 September 1945 – 20 October 1945
7. Nichols Field, Philippines, 1st Weather Group, 20 October 1945 – 16 May 1946
8. Fort William McKinley, Philippines, 1st Weather Group, 16 May 1946 – 1 July 1947
9. Kadena Air Base, Okinawa, Okinawa, Philippines, 1st Weather Group, 1 July 1947 – 1 June 1948
10. Kadena Air Base, Okinawa, Okinawa, 1st Weather Group (later the 2100th Air Weather)(No Relationship to previous 1st Weather Group) 1 June 1948 – 23 October 1949
11. Kadena Air Base, Okinawa, Okinawa, 2143rd Air Weather Wing, 23 October 1949 – 8 February 1954
12. Kadena Air Base, Okinawa, Okinawa, 1st Weather Wing, 8 February 1954 – 18 February 1957
13. Kadena Air Base, Okinawa, Okinawa, 10th Weather Group, 18 February 1957 – 8 August 1959
14. Charleston Air Force Base, South Carolina, Military Air Transport Service, 28 February 1961 – 8 July 1961
15. Charleston Air Force Base, South Carolina, 8th Weather Group, 8 July 1963 – 30 August 1963
16. McGuire Air Force Base, New Jersey, 8th Weather Group, 30 August 1963 – 8 October 1965
17. McGuire Air Force Base, New Jersey, 7th Weather Wing, 8 October 1965 – 30 June 1972
18. Scott Air Force Base, Illinois, 5th Weather Wing, 30 June 1972 – 1 January 1976
19. Wright-Patterson Air Force Base, Ohio, 7th Weather Wing, 1 January 1976 – 1 June 1980
20. McGuire Air Force Base, New Jersey, 7th Weather Wing, 1 June 1980 – 30 September 1991
21. Hickam Air Force Base, Hawaii, 15th Operations Group, 1 June 1992 – 1 August 1994
22. Scott Air Force Base, Illinois, Air Mobility Command Tanker Airlift Control Center, 15 February 1999 – 25 May 2006
23. Scott Air Force Base, Illinois, 1st Weather Group, 25 May 2006 – present

== Emblem ==
Approved on 9 October 1943

Blue and yellow are the Air force colors. Blue alludes to the sky, the primary theater of Air force operations. Yellow refers to the sun and the excellence required of Air force personnel. The gauntlet gripping a lightning bolt from a thunderstorm cloud represents the unit's ability to maintain a firm forecasting grip on rapidly changing weather and assessment to the wing. The two background colors represent the day and night global capability and mobility of the unit.

== History ==
In the early months of World War II, weather support was unorganized and consisted of small groups of forecasters and observers attached to bombardment groups. In order to provide organization and centralization of Air Force Weather Agency, the 15th Weather Squadron was created. The 15th Weather Squadron was established 10 April 1942, and activated at McClellan Air Force Base, California, 22 April. With approximately 235 men, the squadron moved from McClellan Field to a staging area in the International Harvester Building in Oakland, California, 16 June. Where the Weather Squadron departed for Melbourne.

In the later part of July and first part of August, the Headquarters in Melbourne were busy sending men to different weather locations in Australia stretching from Melbourne to Cape York Peninsula. About half went on a long rail trip north to Townsville, Queensland (approximately 1,000 miles). From their new headquarters location in Townsville, Queensland, the squadron could better support the network of stations located throughout Australia and New Guinea that were providing reliable weather information to the heavy bombardment groups then actively bombing Japanese installations in Papua and New Britain.

By the end of World War II, more than 719 weathermen were assigned to 21 units in Australia, 23 units in New Guinea, eight units in the Philippines, and 17 units in the East Indies. The weathermen of the 15th WS were daring, courageous, and brave in their attempts to record the weather for the United States Army Air Forces. Besides the daily job of observing and forecasting the weather, the forecasters and observers attached to bombardment groups accompanied the planes on their missions adding in-flight weather information to the data and weather reports that were being transmitted over the network of weather and communications systems. Some came under attack by the Japanese, suffered the same routine of nerve-wracking bombing raids, ground attacks, disease, and discomfort that other ground and service forces endured. When the Japanese Army's advance was stopped, the men in the 15th WS accompanied United States Army troops and services forces to set up new weather stations at each of the islands they took back. In addition, some of the weathermen of the 15th Weather Squadron were selected for special training in guerrilla warfare for duty in the Philippines and in other areas of the Southwest Pacific.

== Recent history ==
The 15th Operational Weather Squadron was formed as part of the Chief of Staff of the United States Air Force's weather reengineering effort and commenced operations on 19 February 1999. The 125-person regional forecast center reaches full operating capability in June 2001 and provides direct meteorological support to the Tanker Airlift Control Center and total force flying missions in the northeast United States.

The 15th Operational Weather Squadron was the recipient of the United States Air Force Fawbush-Miller Award recognizing the Outstanding Operational Weather Squadron performing the most outstanding weather support, operations, and training. During 2000, the squadron pioneered the use of database and web technologies to produce and disseminate over 3 million forecasts for 126 Air Force and Army active duty, guard and reserve flying units in a 22-state area of responsibility. Their total integration with mission planners re-routing weather restricted C-5 Galaxy and C-17 Globemaster III missions ensured pinpoint selection of favorable air refueling tracks and airfields resulting in cost avoidance in excess of $12M.

The 15th Operational Weather Squadron, Scott Air Force Base, IL., was the first of the four OWS's to re-align under the newly formed 1st Weather Group during a ceremony 25 May 2006. The 26th OWS was realigned at Barksdale Air Force Base, 22 June 2006. Next, was the 25th Operational Weather Squadron at Davis-Monthan Air Force Base on 6 July 2006, and the last addition to the team was the 9th Operational Weather Squadron which was re-activated on 20 July 2006 at Shaw Air Force Base.

== Awards ==
- Service Streamers: World War II, & Asiatic-Pacific Theater
- 2000 Fawbush-Miller Award for Outstanding Air Force Operational Weather Squadron of the year.
- 12 Outstanding Unit Award for periods: March 1956–October 1956; 1 July 1972 – 30 June 1973; 1 July 1973 – 31 December 1974; 1 July 1977 – 30 June 1979; 1 June 1992 – 30 June 1993; 1 October 1993 – 1 August 1994; 1 April 2000 – 31 March 2006; 1 April 2007 – 31 December 2008.
