= 20th Operational Weather Squadron =

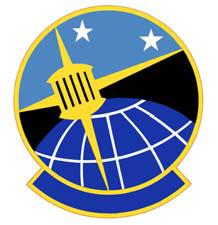
20th OWS

The 20th Operational Weather Squadron which provided forecasts for the Air Force and Army in Japan and South Korea, is now inactive following the transfer of its mission to Hickam Air Force Base, Hawaii on 17 April 2006.

== Mission ==
Until its inactivation in April 2006, the 20th Operational Weather Squadron was responsible for producing and disseminating mission planning and execution weather analyses, forecasts, and briefings for Air Force, Army, Navy, Marines, Guard, Reserve, USFK, PACOM, PACAF, USAPRAC, SOCPAC, and NAVPAC forces operating at 115 installations/sites over 5.2 million sq.mi. within the Pacific theater of operations.

This weather squadron was responsible for base or post forecasting, developing weather products, briefing transient aircrews, and weather warnings for all of their geographical units. Using automatic observing systems located at all military installations and communicating with their combat weather flights, the squadron was able to 'watch' the weather in their entire area of responsibility from one central location.

The Operational Weather Squadron was the first place a newly schooled weather apprentice would report. At the squadron, working alongside a seasoned weather professional, the forecaster was trained in all aspects of Air Force meteorology, from pilot briefing to tactical forecasting.

The weather squadron worked closely with the combat weather flights they support to ensure a flawless exchange of weather information.

== Personnel and resources ==
20th Operational Weather Squadron's manning consisted of active duty, reserve, civilian and contract personnel and was located on Yokota Air Base, Japan, Under the Fifth Air Force, Yokota Air Base, Japan.

== Lineage ==
Activations and Inactivations of the 20th Weather Squadron, and 20th Operational Weather Squadron.

Constituted 20th Weather Squadron and activated on 15 Apr 1943
Disbanded on 31 Oct 1943
Reconstituted on 4 Nov 1944
Activated on 6 Dec 1944
Inactivated on 18 Feb 1957
Activated on 2 Mar 1964
Organized on 8 Jun 1964
Inactivated on 1 Sep 1976
Activated on 1 Jan 1985
Inactivated on 1 Jun 1992
Redesignated 20th Operational Weather Squadron on 13 Jul 2000
Activated on 1 Oct 2000
Inactivated on April 17, 2006

== Duty Assignments ==
List of duty assignments and parent units from 1943 to present.

Cairo, Egypt, 9th Air Force, 15 April 1943 – 31 October 1943
Sorido Airdrome, Biak Island, Netherlands East Indies, Far East Air Forces Regional Control and Weather Group (provisional), 6 December 1944 – 9 May 1945 Fort William McKinley, Manila, Luzon, P.I., Far East Air Forces Regional Control and Weather Group, 9 May 1945 – 14 August 1945
Nichols Field, Luzon, P.I., Far East Air Forces Regional Control and Weather Group 14 August 1945 – 20 September 1945
Nichols Field, Luzon, P.I., 1st Weather Group later, 2100st Air weather Group, 20 September 1945 – 2 November 1945
Tokyo, Japan, 1st Weather Group (later, 2100st Air weather Group), 2 November 1945 – 22 May 1946
Yamato Building, Nagoya, 1st Weather Group (later 2100st Air weather Group), 22 May 1946 – 23 October 1949
Yamato Building, Nagoya, 2143rd Air Weather Wing, 23 October 1949 – 8 February 1954
Yamato Building, Nagoya, 1st Weather Wing 8 February 1954 – c. August 1954
Sumitomo Building, Nagoya, 1st Weather Wing, c. August 1954 – c. April 1956
Nagoya Air Station (later Moriyama Air Station), Japan, 1st Weather Wing c. April 1956 – 18 February 1957
Fuchu Air Station, Japan, 1st Weather Wing, 8 June 1964 – 6 October 1974
Yokota Air Base, Japan, 1st Weather Wing, 6 October 1974 – 1 September 1976
Yokota Air Base, Japan, 1st Weather Wing, 1 January 1985 – 30 September 1991
Yokota Air Base, Japan, Pacific Air Forces, 30 September 1991 – 1 April 1992
Hickam Air Force Base, Hawaii, Pacific Air Forces, 1 April 1992 – 15 April 1992
Hickam Air Force Base, Hawaii, 15th Operations Group, 15 April 1992 – 1 June 1992

Yokota Air Base, Japan, Fifth Air Force, 1 October 2000 – 17 April 2006

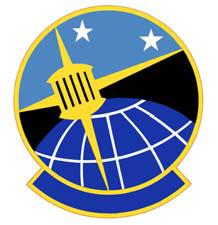
20th OWS

== Emblem ==
Approved on 9 Oct 1986
Blue and yellow are the Air Force colors. Blue alludes to the sky, the primary theater of operations. Yellow refers to the sun and the excellence required of Air Force personnel. The weather satellite symbolizes the mission of the unit to provide support in the atmospheric sciences. The black and light blue background depicts night and day capability. The globe is from the emblem of the parent major command and further depicts global responsibilities. The two stars indicate the services, US Air Force and US Army, that the unit supports by providing meteorological information.

== History ==
The 20th Weather Squadron activated at Cairo, Egypt, on 15 April 1943, and was assigned to the Ninth Air Force, but was soon thereafter disbanded on 31 October 1943.

The Army Air Forces again activated the 20th on 6 December 1944, on Biak Island in what was then known as the Netherlands East Indies, today's Indonesia. The 20th absorbed the resources and mission of the 5231st Weather Squadron (Provisional). The 20th was assigned to the Far East Air Forces Weather Group (Provisional) at that time.

In May 1945 the squadron moved its headquarters from Biak Island to Fort William McKinley near Manila, Philippines. By the close of July 1945, the squadron had grown to more than 700 men and the headquarters was overseeing the work of 34 weather stations, many of which were in isolated locations.

The Army Air Forces Weather Service assumed control of all weather organizations on 1 July 1945, and organized the 20th under the 1st Weather Group on 20 September 1945. Due to congested quarters at Fort William McKinley, the 20th's headquarters moved again in August 1945 to nearby Nichols Field. While headquartered in the Philippines, the 20th lost two men to combat action.

Following the capitulation of Japan, the 20th began its long association with Japan. The squadron moved its headquarters to Tokyo on 2 November 1945, and accompanied Headquarters, Fifth Air Force to Nagoya on 22 May 1946.

War demobilization caused the 20th to lose personnel rapidly. To accomplish its growing mission, the 20th hired local nationals, employed non-weather officers to oversee some weather stations, and began on the-job schools to cross-train enlisted men into weather career fields.

By late 1946, the 20th was operating weather stations in Japan, China, and Korea. The 20th relinquished control of the China stations in 1947 and the last Korean station was closed in 1949. The squadron came under the leadership of the 2143d Air Weather Wing in 1949.

Within three days of North Korean troops crossing into South Korea in June 1950, a detachment of the 20th Weather Squadron was airlifted to Daegu, Korea. The leadership of the 20th Weather Squadron was soon burdened by the growth of detachments both in Korea and Japan to support the war effort. By early November 1950, the 20th was overseeing 27 detachments, eight of which were in Korea, where, on average, one of these detachments relocated every five days. The Air Force activated the 30th Weather Squadron to oversee Korean operations, but the 20th remained deeply involved in the war effort.

The 20th was assigned to the newly activated 1st Weather Wing in 1954. The squadron was inactivated on 18 February 1957, but emerged anew at Fuchu Air Station, Japan, on 8 June 1964, where it remained until 1974 when it relocated to Yokota Air Base. Again, it was inactivated in 1976 as part of an Air Weather Service reorganization only to return at Yokota on 1 January 1985.

As part of the divestiture of Air Weather Service, the 20th was assigned to Pacific Air Forces in 1991. It relocated to Hickam Air Force Base, Hawaii, on 1 April 1992, and was inactivated on 1 June. With the reengineering of the Air Force Weather Agency the 20th was redesignated an Operational Weather Squadron on 13 July 2000, and activated on 1 October. It was assigned to Fifth Air Force and stationed again at Yokota Air Base, Japan.

== Recent history ==
The 20th Operational Weather Squadron became inactive on 17 April 2006 when its mission was transferred to the 17th Operational Weather Squadron at Hickam Field, Hawaii.

== Awards ==
Service Streamers. World War II European-African-Middle Eastern Theater; Korean Service
Campaign Streamers. World War II Asiatic-Pacific Theater, New Guinea 1943-1944
Decorations. Air Force Outstanding Unit Award for periods: Mar 1956-Oct 1956; 2 Jul 1967 – 30 Jun 1969; 1 Jul 1970-30 Jun 1972; 1 Jul 1972 – 30 Jun 1973; 1 Jul 1974-30 Jun 1976; 1 Jul 1986 – 30 Jun 1988.
