= 9th Operational Weather Squadron =

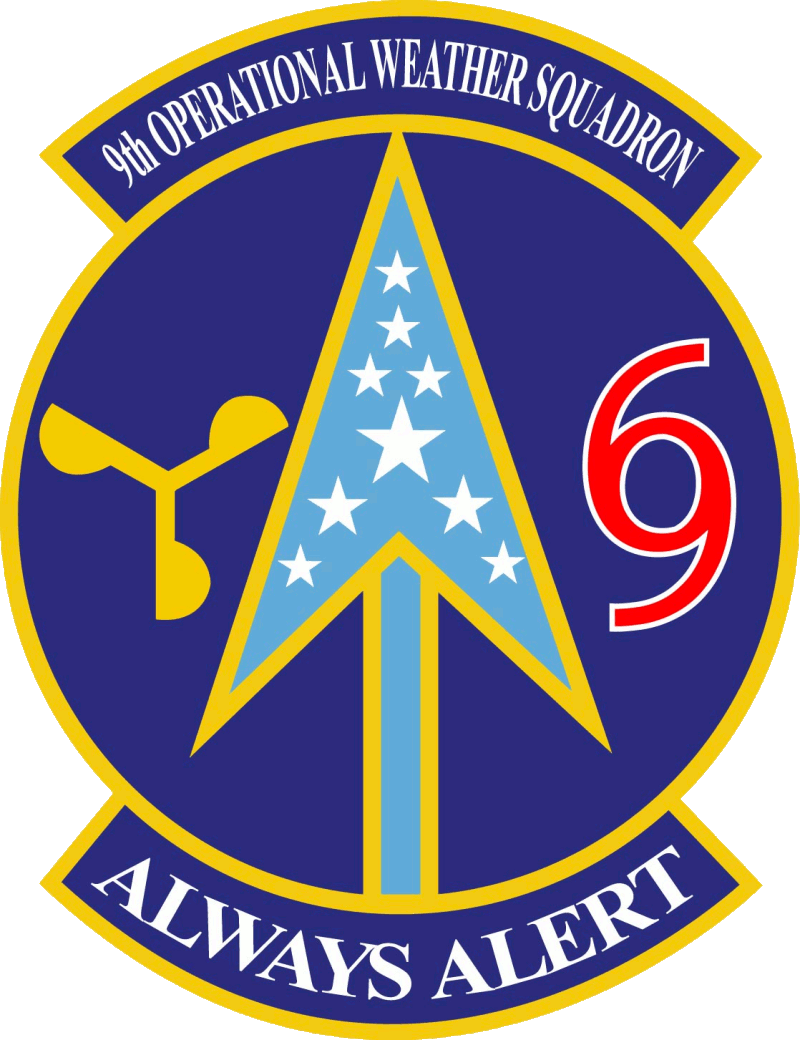
- 9th Operational Weather Squadron emblem
- Active: 2006- 31 May 2008
- Country: United States
- Branch: United States Air Force
- Part of: 1st Weather Group
- Garrison/HQ: Shaw AFB, SC
- Mascot(s): Hurricanes

The 9th Operational Weather Squadron (9 OWS), based out of Shaw AFB, SC, was the Squadron responsible for weather prediction in the Southeastern United States. It was split from the 28th Operational Weather Squadron in 2006. The 9 OWS inactivated on 31 May 2008 and merged with the 26th Operational Weather Squadron located on Barksdale AFB, Louisiana.

== Mission ==
The 9th Operational Weather Squadron was responsible for producing and disseminating mission planning and execution weather analyses, forecasts, and briefings for Air Force, Army, Navy, Marines, Guard, Reserve, USSTRATCOM, and USNORTHCOM forces operating at 40 installations/sites in a 4 state region of the Southeastern United States.

The 9th weather squadron was responsible for base or post forecasting, developing weather products, briefing transient aircrews, and weather warnings for all of their geographical units. Using automatic observing systems located at all military installations and communicating with their combat weather flights, the squadron was able to 'watch' the weather in their entire area of responsibility from one central location.

== Cold War History ==
For much of the Cold War, the 9th Weather Squadron was based at March ARB, California. The squadron oversaw weather detachments at 15th Air Force bases of the Strategic Air Command primarily in the western United States. It was inactivated in 1991 as part of a larger Air Force reorganization.

== History as an Operational Weather Squadron ==
On 20 July 2006, the 28th Operational Weather Squadron was split into the USCENTCOM which would stay the 28th Operational Weather Squadron, and the 9th Operational Weather Squadron was reactivated, which would continue the CONUS based operations. The squadron was inactivated in 2008.

=== Personnel and resources ===
9th Operational Weather Squadron's manning consisted of active duty, reserve, civilian and contract personnel and was located on Shaw Air Force Base, SC., under the 1st Weather Group, Offutt Air Force Base, NE.

=== Emblem ===
Against the background of blue, which depicts the sky, the primary theater of Air Force operations, the directional arrowhead represents the three main air routes served by the unit when it was organized in 1942. The stars allude to the squadron's mission of support for multiple unified commands and military installations in the Southeastern United States, with the number of stars indicating its numerical designation, the large star denoting its Air Force Outstanding Unit Award. The three-cup anemometer is emblematic of the weather mission. The hurricane represents the tropics, the unit's first area of operations and the most severe that threatens its area of operation. The emblem bears the national colors of red, white, and blue and the Air Force colors of golden yellow and ultramarine blue.

== Lineage ==
- Constituted as the 9th Weather Squadron

Activated on 17 July 1942
Inactivated on 30 June 1972
Activated on 1 January 1975
Inactivated on 15 July 1992

- Redesignated 9th Operational Weather Squadron

Activated on 20 Jul 2006
Inactivated on 24 June 2008

=== Assignments ===
- Caribbean Wing, Air Transport Command, 17 June 1942
- Flight Control Command, ca. 1943
- Weather Wing, Flight Control Command (later Army Air Forces Weather Wing), May 1943
- 68th Army Air Forces Base Unit (101st Weather Group), 1944
- 101st Weather Group (later 2101st Weather Group), 3 June 1948
- 2059th Air Weather Wing, 1 October 1950
- 2101st Air Weather Group, 1 August 1951
- 1st Weather Group, 1 April 1952
- 3d Weather Wing, 1 October 1956 - 30 June 1972
- 3d Weather Wing, 1 January 1975 - 15 July 1992
- 1st Weather Group, 20 July 2006 – 24 June 2008

=== Stations ===
- Morrison Field, Florida 17 June 1942
- Borrinquen Field (later Ramey Air Force Base), Puerto Rico, ca December 1942
- March Air Force Base, California, unknown - 30 June 1972
- March Air Force Base, California, 1 January 1975 - 15 July 1992
- Shaw Air Force Base, South Carolina, 20 July 2006 – 24 June 2008

== See also ==
- List of United States Air Force weather squadrons
