= 1st Weather Group =

1st Weather Group

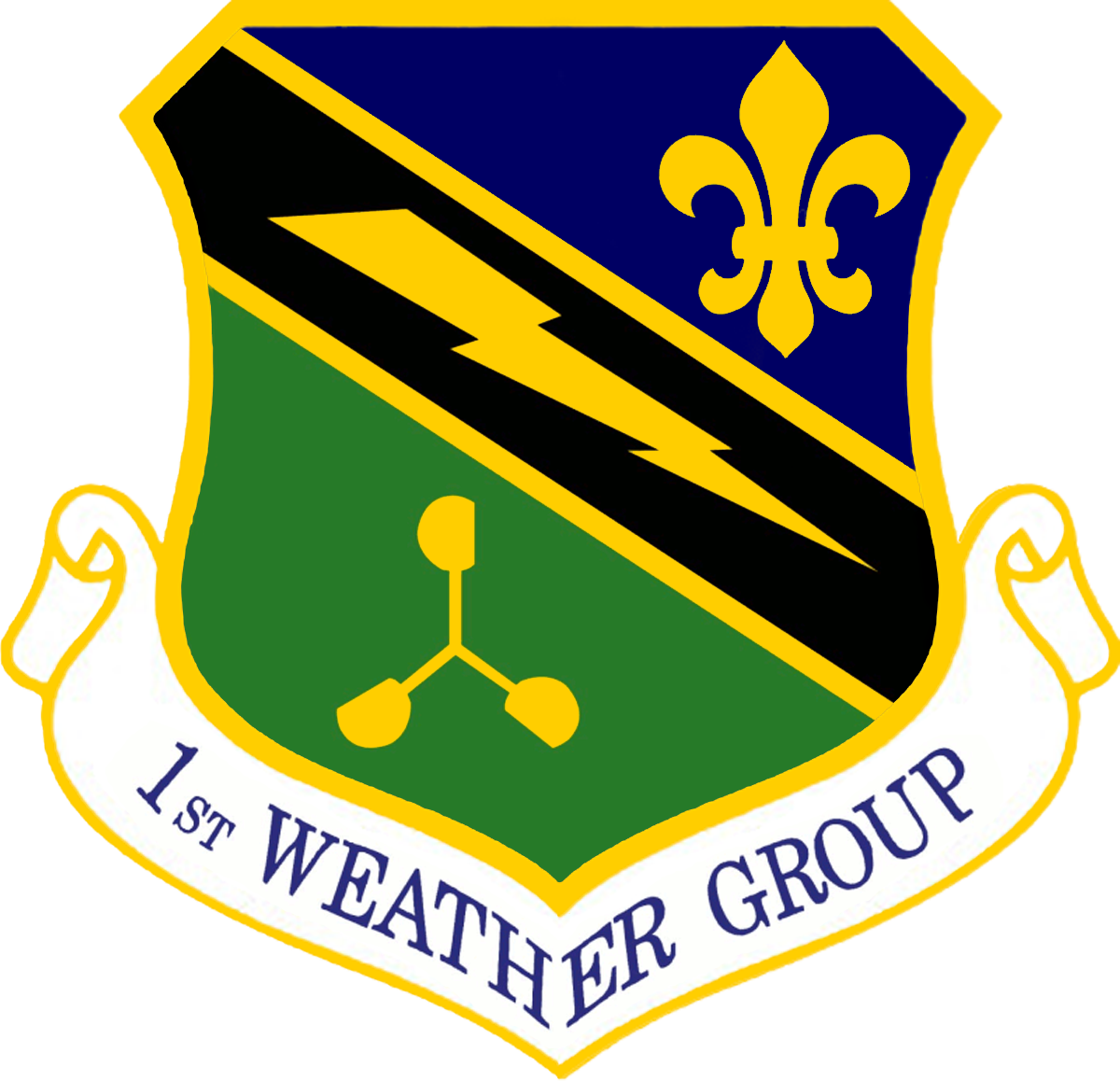
- 1st Weather Group Patch
- Active: 1945–1948; 1952–1956; 1966–1972; 1992–1994; 2006–present
- Country: United States
- Branch: United States Air Force
- Type: Group
- Role: Weather Surveillance
- Part of: Air Combat Command
- Garrison/HQ: Offutt AFB, Nebraska

The 1st Weather Group is a group of the United States Air Force. It oversees all six operational weather squadrons; the 15th Operational Weather Squadron at Scott Air Force Base, Illinois; the 17th Operational Weather Squadron at Joint Base Pearl Harbor–Hickam, Hawaii; the 21st Operational Weather Squadron at Kapaun Air Station, Germany; the 25th Operational Weather Squadron at Davis-Monthan AFB, Ariz.; the 26th OWS at Barksdale AFB, La.; and the 28th OWS at Shaw AFB, SC. The 1st WXG is a subordinate of the 557th Weather Wing.

== Mission ==
"Provide accurate, timely, and relevant weather analyses, forecasts, warnings and briefings to Air Force, Army, Guard, Reserve, and Combatant Command forces operating in the continental United States."

"Provide initial qualification and up-grade training for weather forecaster apprentices and new weather officers."

== Personnel and resources ==
The 1st Weather Group is part of the 557th Weather Wing's worldwide organizational force of more than 1,100 professionals. The 1st WXG manning consists of active duty, reserve, civilian and contract personnel and is headquartered on Offutt Air Force Base, Neb.

== Organization ==
The 1st Weather Group is organized into six squadrons. Each of the squadrons produces forecasts for a specified area of the world. The squadrons also serve as training hubs for new weather professionals – both enlisted and officers.

== Subordinate units ==
- 15th Operational Weather Squadron, Scott Air Force Base, Illinois
- 17th Operational Weather Squadron, Joint Base Pearl Harbor–Hickam, Hawaii
- 21st Operational Weather Squadron, Kapaun Air Station, Germany
- 25th Operational Weather Squadron, Davis-Monthan Air Force Base, Arizona
- 26th Operational Weather Squadron, Barksdale Air Force Base, Louisiana
- 28th Operational Weather Squadron, Shaw Air Force Base, South Carolina

== History ==
The 1st Weather Group starts as the Far East Air Forces Weather Group in October 1944. In September 1945, the 1st Group was assigned to the 43rd Weather Wing and later that year to the Headquarters Army Air Forces Weather Service. They were inactivated in 1948, and reactivated and assigned to the Air Weather Service at Offutt Air Force Base through the Military Air Transport Service from 1952 to 1956, after which they were again inactivated. The group reactivated once again under the 1st Weather Wing from 1966 to 1972 at Tan Son Nhut Air Base, Vietnam. The most recent period of activation was at Fort McPherson, Ga., from 1992 to 1994 under the Air Combat Command.

The group (military unit)group was distinguished with service and campaign streamers from World War II and Vietnam. They also earned four Air Force Outstanding Unit Awards and the Republic of Vietnam Gallantry Cross.

The realignment began with the reactivation of the 1st Weather Group at Offutt Air Force Base, Neb., 25 May. The 1st WXG provides weather products and service to Air Force and Army units, and is part of the Air Force Weather Agency.

The 15th Operational Weather Squadron, Scott Air Force Base, Illinois, was the first operational weather squadron to align under the newly formed 1st WXG during a ceremony 25 May 2006. The 26th Operational Weather Squadron was realigned at Barksdale Air Force Base on 22 June 2006. Next was the 25th Operational Weather Squadron at Davis-Monthan Air Force Base on 6 July 2006, and the last 2006 addition to the team was the 9th Operational Weather Squadron which was reactivated on 20 July 2006 at Shaw Air Force Base. The 9th was subsequently inactivated on 31 May 2008. When the Air Force Weather Agency became the 557th Weather Wing in March 2015, three more squadrons aligned under the group: the 17th Operational Weather Squadron at Joint Base Pearl Harbor–Hickam; the 21st Operational Weather Squadron at Kapaun Air Station, Germany; and the 28th Operational Weather Squadron at Shaw Air Force Base.

== Lineage ==
- Constituted as the 1st Weather Group on 29 August 1945 (Note: The unit is not related to the 1st Weather Group (Provisional) that was organized by Army Air Forces, Pacific Ocean Areas at Wheeler Field, Hawaii on 4 September 1944 and discontinued on 10 February 1945. Nor is it related to the 1st Weather Group that was designated by Military Air Transport Service on 19 May 1948, organized at Haneda Airport, Japan on 1 June 1948, redesignated 2100th Air Weather Group on 1 October 1948, and discontinued on 10 October 1949.)

Activated on 20 September 1945
Inactivated on 31 May 1948
Activated on 8 July 1966
Inactivated on 30 June 1972
Activated on 15 June 1992
Inactivated on 1 July 1994
Activated on 3 May 2006

=== Assignments ===
- 43rd Weather Wing, 20 September 1945 – 31 May 1948
- Air Weather Service, 20 April 1952 – 8 October 1956
- 1st Weather Wing, 8 July 1966 – 30 June 1972
- Air Combat Command, 15 June 1992 – 1 July 1996
- Air Force Weather Agency (later 557th Weather Wing), 3 May 2006 – present

=== Stations ===
- Manila, Philippines, 20 September 1945 – 31 May 1948
- Offutt Air Force Base, Nebraska, 20 April 1952 – 8 October 1956
- Tan Son Nhut Airport (later Tan Son Nhut Air Base), 8 July 1966 – 30 June 1972
- Langley Air Force Base, Virginia, 15 June 1992
- Fort McPherson, Georgia, c. 1993 – 1 July 1996
- Offutt Air Force Base, Nebraska, 3 May 2006 – present

== See also ==
- List of United States Air Force weather squadrons
