= 19th Expeditionary Weather Squadron =

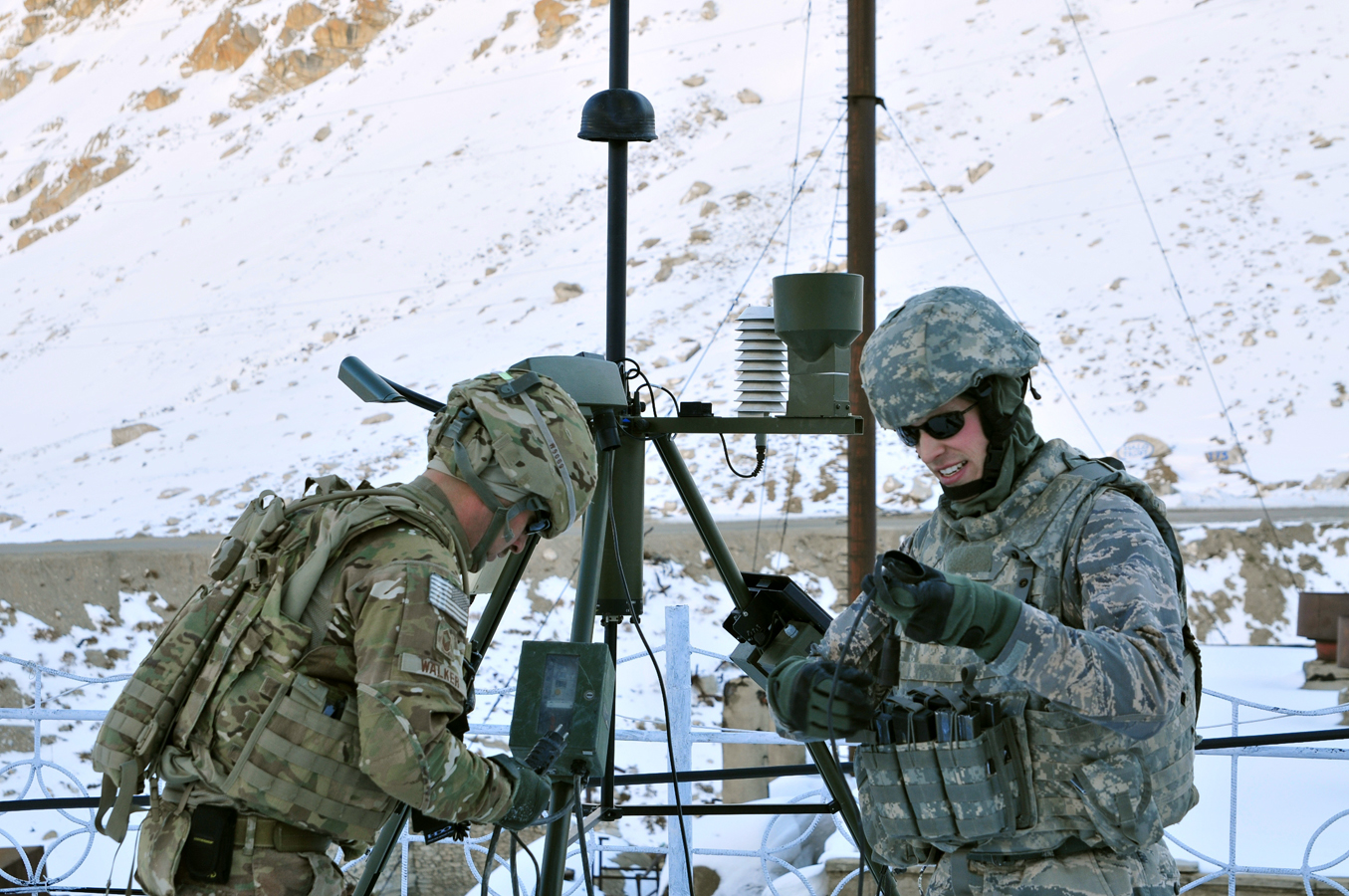
- 19 Expeditionary Weather Squadron airmen installing a weather station in Afghanistan in December 2011]
- Active: 1942–1947; 1948–1961; by 2012–2014
- Country: United States
- Branch: United States Air Force
- Role: Weather observation and forecasting
- Part of: Air Combat Command
- Engagements: Mediterranean Theater of Operations

Insignia
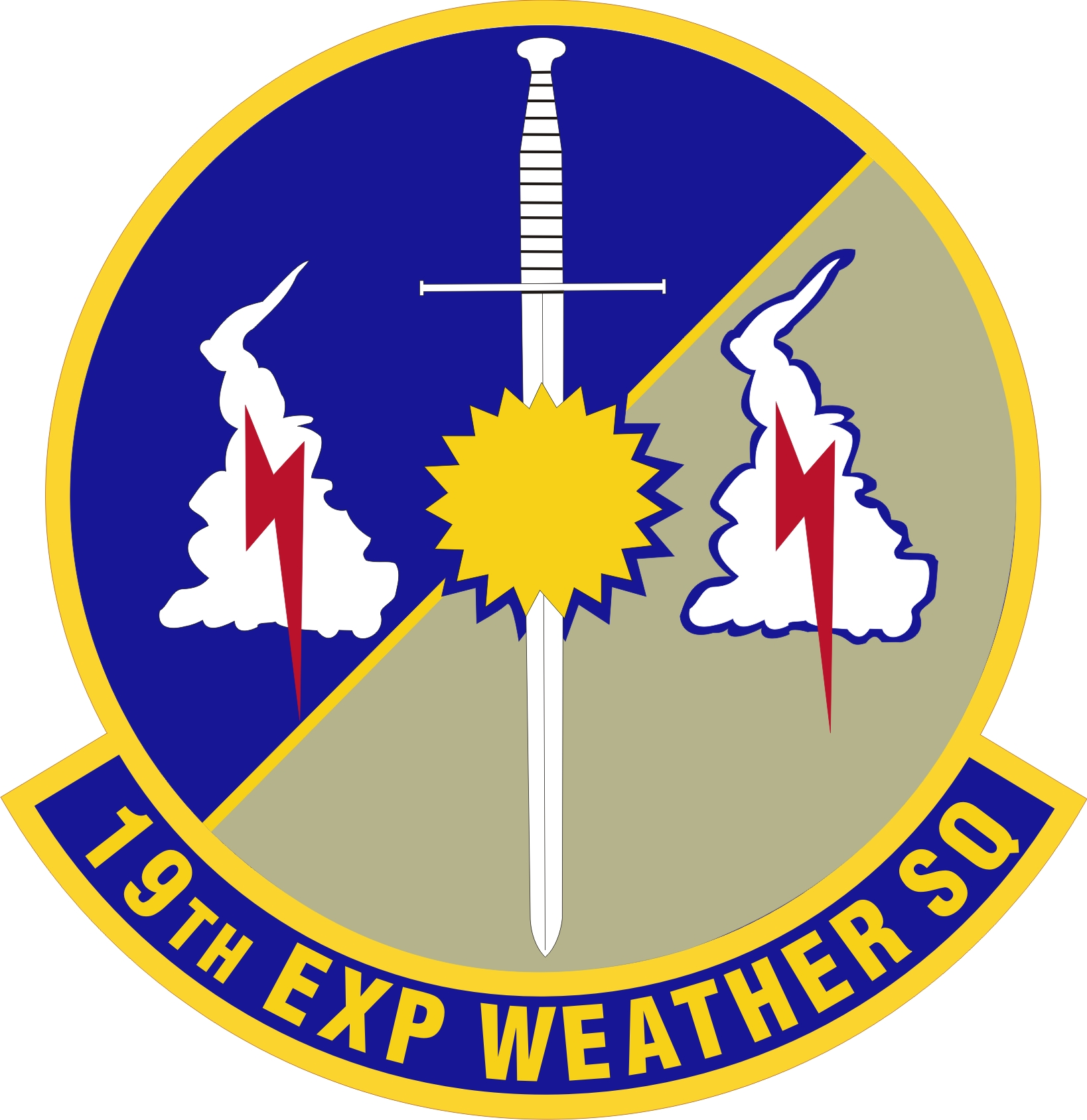
- 19th Expeditionary Weather Squadron emblem (Note: Blazon: On a disc per bend sinister Azure and Khaki, a bendlet Or, a sword palewise point to base Argent charged with at nombril with a starburst of the third fimbriated of the first, in dexter and sinister a cloud formation of the fourth, each charged with a lightning bolt palewise Gules; all within a narrow Yellow border. Attached below the disc, a Blue scroll edged with a narrow Yellow border and inscribed "19TH EXP WEATHER SQ" in Yellow letters. Symbolism: Ultramarine blue and Air Force yellow are the Air Force colors. Blue alludes to the sky, the primary theater of Air Force operations. Yellow refers to the sun and the excellence required of Air Force personnel. The significance of the split field has to do with weather support to both Air Force aviation and to the Army ground forces. Bad weather represented by thunderclouds with lightning threatens both the air and ground theaters of operation, but the mission of the 19 EWXS is to forecast good weather, which is represented by the sun, in the midst of bad in which the unit can deliver combat power, signified by the sword, from the air to the ground.)

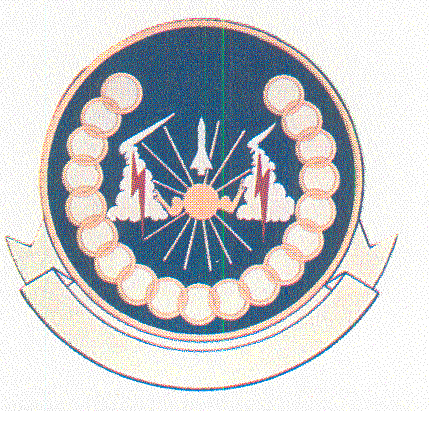
- 19th Weather Squadron emblem (approved 10 July 1959) (Note: The blue background represents the sky and the chain of 19 links represents the 19th Weather Squadron, nearly surrounding the unchained Goddess of Weather. The aircraft represents airpower surmounting weather conditions. Markus, et al., p. 126)

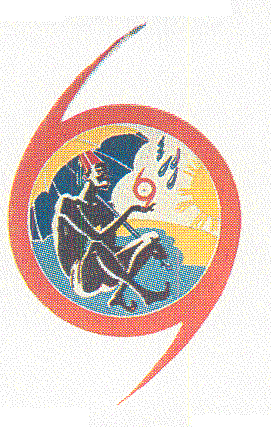
- 19th Weather Squadron emblem (approved 4 May 44)

The 19th Expeditionary Weather Squadron is an inactive unit of the United States Air Force. It last performed weather related duties as part of the International Security Assistance Force in Afghanistan from 2009 to 2014. It was assigned to the 504th Expeditionary Air Support Operations Group. The squadron was first active during World War II where it served in Africa. Following the end of the war, it was stripped of personnel and equipment, but remained on the active roll until 1947. The squadron was reactivated in 1948 and provided weather services from various bases in the midwestern United States until inactivating in 1961 .

== History ==
=== World War II ===
The squadron was first organized at Bolling Field, District of Columbia at the end of June 1942. After organizing and training in the United States, it departed for the Mediterranean Theater of Operations in September, arriving in Egypt in November. Squadron headquarters was located on the Horn of Africa, at Gura, Eritrea by December, but relocated to Accra, Gold Coast (now Ghana) by the spring of 1943, and remained there for the rest of the war. The squadron operated through detachments located throughout northern Africa and, after 1943, in Italy. The squadron supported special operations in the Mediterranean. By May 1944, it had seven detachments operating behind German lines in the Balkans, primarily in Albania and Yugoslavia. In March, two squadron weather observers and a radioman had parachuted into Yugoslavia and were embedded with Tito's partisan forces to provide information for Douglas C-47 Skytrains airlifting supplies for the partisans.

In the spring of 1946 the squadron left Accra, and in June 1946, moved without personnel to Wiesbaden, Germany. It remained there as a paper unit until inactivating in October 1947.

=== Cold War ===
The squadron was again activated on 1 June 1948 at Smoky Hill Air Force Base, Kansas. It moved twice in the next three years before arriving at Kansas City, Missouri in September 1951, providing regional weather coverage for USAF units. From Kansas City, and later, from Grandview Air Force Base (later Richards-Gebaur Air Force Base, its detachments provided weather services for the bases of Central Air Defense Force (CADF) and the squadron commander acted as the staff weather officer for CADF. After CADF was inactivated, it provided the same services for 33d Air Division bases. It was inactivated on 8 July 61 and its personnel and equipment transferred to the 29th Weather Squadron, which moved on paper from Malmstrom Air Force Base to Richards-Gebaur.

=== Global War on Terror ===
The squadron was redesignated the 19th Expeditionary Weather Squadron and converted to provisional status. It was assigned to Air Combat Command (ACC) to activate or inactivate as needed. By October, ACC had organized the squadron at and assigned it to the 504th Expeditionary Air Support Operations Group at Bagram Air Field to perform weather observation and forecasting duties as part of the International Security Assistance Force in Afghanistan from 2009 to 2014. The squadron primarily provided support to Army task forces operating throughout Afghanistan.

== Lineage ==
- Constituted as the 19th Weather Squadron, Regional on 13 June 1942

Activated on 30 June 1942
Inactivated on 3 October 1947

- Redesignated 19th Weather Squadron

Activated on 1 June 1948
Inactivated on 8 July 1961

- Redesignated 19th Expeditionary Weather Squadron and converted to provisional status, on 12 February 2009

Activated by 2 October 2009
Inactivated c. 10 November 2014

=== Assignments ===
- Air Weather Service, 30 June 1942
- United States Army in the Middle East, 31 October 1943
- Army Air Forces Weather Service, 19 July 1945
- 5th Weather Group, 2 August 1946 – 3 October 1947
- 103 Weather Group (later 2103d Air Weather Group), 1 June 1948
- 2059th Air Weather Wing, 24 October 1950
- 2103d Air Weather Group, 16 September 1951
- 3d Weather Group, 20 April 1952
- 4th Weather Wing, 8 August 1959 – 8 July 1961
- Air Combat Command to activate or inactivate at any time on or after 12 February 2009

504th Expeditionary Air Support Operations Group, by 2 October 2009 – c. 10 November 2014

=== Stations ===
- Bolling Field, District of Columbia, 30 June–24 September 1942
- Suez, Egypt, 11 November 1942
- Fayid, Egypt, 14 November 1942
- Gura, Eritrea, 19 December 1942
- Accra, Gold Coast, 21 April 1943
- Cazes Air Base, French Morocco, c. May 1946
- Wiesbaden, Germany, 11 June 1946 – 3 October 1947
- Smoky Hill Air Force Base, Kansas, 1 June 1948
- [[Lowry Air Force Base, Colorado, 4 June 1949
- Kansas City]], Missouri, 10 September 1951
- Grandview Air Force Base (later Richards-Gebaur Air Force Base), Missouri, 24 February 1954 – 8 July 1961
- Bagram Airfield, Afghanistan, by 2 October 2009 – c. 10 November 2014

=== Awards and campaigns ===
Award streamer	Award	Dates	Notes
	Air Force Meritorious Unit Award	1 October 2011–30 September 2012	19th Expeditionary Weather Squadron
	Air Force Meritorious Unit Award	1 October 2013–30 September 2014	19th Expeditionary Weather Squadron

Campaign Streamer	Campaign	Dates	Notes
	EAME Theater Service Streamer without inscription	14 November 1942 – 11 May 1945	19th Weather Squadron
	Consolidation II	1 November 2006 – 30 November 2006	19th Expeditionary Weather Squadron
	Consolidation III	1 December 2006 – 30 June 2011	19th Expeditionary Weather Squadron

== See also ==
- List of United States Air Force weather squadrons
