= 607th Combat Weather Squadron =

U.S. Air Force military unit

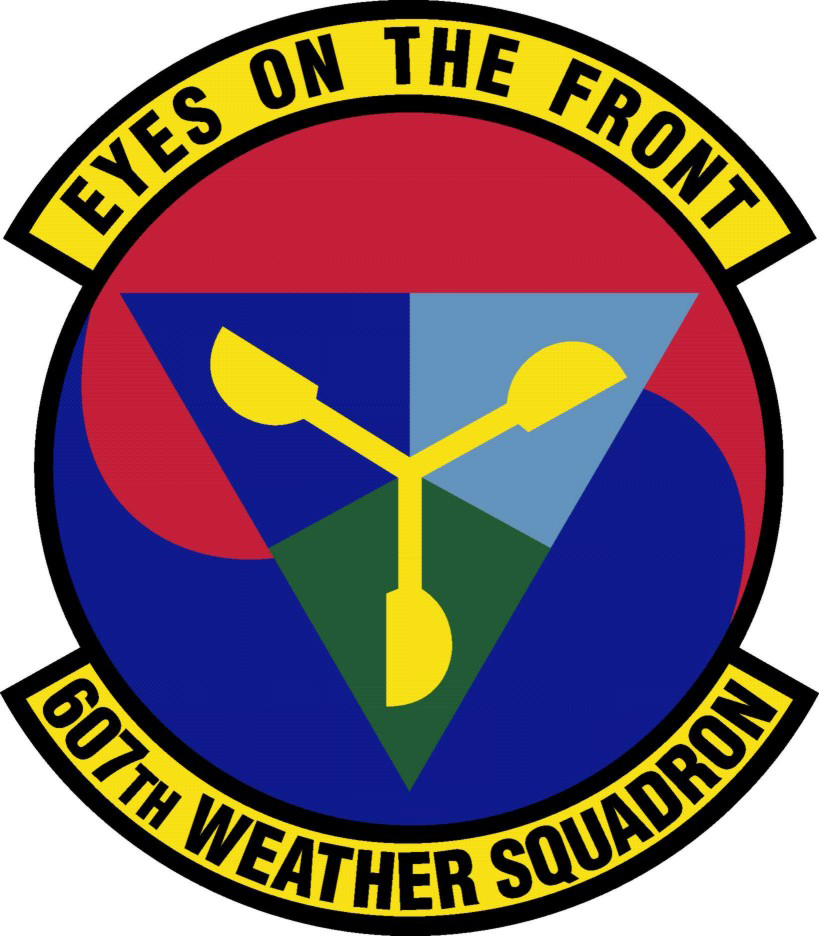
- Current Squadron Emblem
- Active: December 1994 – Present
- Country: United States
- Allegiance: Combined Forces Command (CFC) & United States Forces Korea (USFK)
- Branch: Air Force
- Type: Combat Weather Squadron
- Role: Battlefield Weather Support
- Size: 57 military and 2 civilian personnel.
- Part of: Pacific Air Forces, 7th Air Force, 607th Air Support Operations Group
- Garrison/HQ: USAG-Humphreys, Pyongtaek, Republic of Korea
- Patron: United States Forces Korea, Eighth Army
- Motto: "Eyes on the Front"

Commanders
- Current commander: Lt Col Benjamin Wood

The 607th Combat Weather Squadron (607 CWS) of the U.S. Air Force has overall responsibility for planning, providing, and/or arranging weather support for the United States Army during armistice conditions in Korea. 607 CWS and elements of the US Navy and US Marines support the Republic of Korea Air Force (ROKAF) Weather Wing, Combined Meteorological and Oceanographic (METOC) Officer (CMO) and subordinate squadrons during exercises and contingencies. The 607 CWS commander is also the Joint METOC Officer (JMO) and the senior US METOC officer (SMO) for the Korean Theater of Operations (KTO).

== History ==
Following the conclusion of World War II, Korean weather support was managed by the 20th Weather Squadron, headquartered in Japan. The lone Air Force weather detachment in Korea was closed in September 1949.

Mobile units of the 20th returned to Korea the next year at the start of the Korean War. The 30th Weather Squadron was soon reactivated with its headquarters in Korea to support the Fifth Air Force and other United Nations Forces. Within one month, the unit's headquarters were forced to retreat south from Seoul to Taegu. It remained in Taegu until July 1951, when it returned to Seoul. In 1954, the headquarters moved to Osan Air Base.

After the end of the Korean War, the 30th Weather Squadron began to turn over several of its locations to the Republic of Korea (ROK) Air Force. In 1957, headquarters of the 30th moved from Korea to Japan, to oversee the weather detachments in Korea and Japan with the inactivation of the 20th Weather Squadron. In 1957, the 30th was assigned to the 10th Weather Group. In 1959, the 30th was inactivated and its detachments assigned directly to the 10th Weather Group. The 10th Weather Group was inactivated in 1960.

From 1960 to 1964, the remaining USAF weather units in Korea reported directly to the First Weather Wing located at Hickam AFB, Hawaii. In 1964, the 20th Weather Squadron was reactivated at Fuchu Air Station, Japan, and again took responsibility for managing the USAF weather units in Korea. In 1974, 20th Weather Squadron headquarters moved to Yokota AB, Japan, and continued to manage USAF weather support in Korea until it was inactivated on 1 September 1976.

On that date, the 30th Weather Squadron was reactivated at Yongsan Army Garrison, Seoul, and all USAF weather units on the Korean peninsula were placed under the squadron's control. The 30th Weather Squadron managed all US weather support in Korea until 1992.

In 1992, the US Air Force reorganized, placing all support assets under the control of the local Wing Commander. The 30th Weather Squadron was again inactivated, the squadron at Yongsan was redesignated as the 51st Weather Squadron, and weather units at Osan and Kunsan were removed from squadron control and placed under the local USAF Wing Commanders at their respective bases. The 51st Weather Squadron continued to manage weather support to the Commander, United Nations Command, the Commander, Combined Forces Command, the Commander, United States Forces Korea (CDR, USFK), the Commander, Eighth Army (CDR, 8A), and to all US Army units on the peninsula.

Because the 51st Weather Squadron was not under the operational control of the 51st Fighter Wing at Osan AB, the decision was made in July 1993 to replace it with the reactivated 5th Weather Squadron, which had a long lineage of battle decorations from the Pacific Theater in World War II and the Vietnam War.

Another USAF restructuring of Numbered Air Forces and a drive toward standardized naming conventions caused the Air Force to inactivate the 5th Weather Squadron and to activate the 607th Weather Squadron in December 1994. Today, the 607th Weather Squadron is part of the 607th Air Support Operations Group, 7th Air Force, Pacific Air Forces.

In 1999, the 607th Weather Squadron became the USAF's second "Weather Hub". In this capacity, the squadron was responsible for providing all point and area weather forecasts for US Forces Command forces operating on the Korean Peninsula. The Weather Hub portion of the 607th was decommissioned and moved to Japan in 2003.

As part of the Yongsan Relocation Plan Detachment 1, Camp Red Cloud was closed and moved to Camp Humphreys in Nov/Dec 2018. Headquarters 607th Weather Squadron moved from Yongsan Army Garrison in April 2019 consolidating with Det 2, at Camp Humphreys.

On 1 June 2021 the Unit was re-designated the 607th Combat Weather Squadron to show its alignment with combat units. Today the Squadron has 57 personnel assigned to two locations on the Korean Peninsula; K-16 Air Base, Seoul AB East; and USAG-Humphreys, Pyongtaek.

== Commanders ==
- Lt Col Richard Bensinger (1995–1997)
- Lt Col Tom Schott (1997–1999)
- Lt Col Michael L. Davenport (1999–2001)
- Lt Col Kevin P. Callahan (2001–2003)
- Lt Col Mark B. Miller (2003–2005)
- Lt Col Leanne Siedlarz (2005–2007)
- Lt Col Robert T. Swanson (2007–2009)
- Lt Col Travis A. Steen (2009–2011)
- Lt Col Edward C. Harris (2011–2013)
- Lt Col James C. Weaver (2013-2015)
- Lt Col Jason W. Wild (2015–2017)
- Lt Col Christopher M. Chase (2017-2019)
- Lt Col Kevin M. Bourne (2019–2022)
- Lt Col Nessa E. Hock (2022-2024)
- Lt Col Jacob J. Dalrymple (2024-2026)
- Lt Col Benjamin Wood (2026-Present)

== Organization ==
The 607 CWS is functionally organized to provide weather support to Headquarters, United Nations Command/US Forces Korea (UNC/USFK) and subordinate Air, Ground, Naval, Marine and Special Operations Component Commands.

In-theater units provide weather support at 15 locations in the ROK. Five locations support the U.S. Army's 2 Combat Aviation Brigade and 2nd Infantry Division (United States) and three units support combined/joint operations during exercises and contingencies. These units would be augmented by weather forces attached to and supporting inbound combat units in contingencies/war.

The 607 CWS at (United States Army Garrison) USAG-Humphreys is divided into two main functional areas: Mission Support and Operations. The 607 WS provides weather forecast products for Korea and the adjacent waters. The staff form the nucleus of the Combined Meteorological Forecast Unit (CMFU) during exercises/contingencies. The 607 CWS areas of expertise include operations, forecasting, observing, plans, communications, mobility/readiness, security, scientific services, administration, training and logistics.

The 607 CWS staff provides direct support to the UNC/USFK, the 2nd Infantry Division (2ID), and Eighth Army (8A). They maintain liaison with US Navy weather support activities and also coordinate weather support with the ROKAF Weather Wing (WW) of the ROK Air Force and ROK Navy. In addition they provide briefings, observations, and staff weather support, including limited observing support at H-264 helipad.

== See also ==
- List of United States Air Force weather squadrons
- United States Forces Korea
