= 28th Operational Weather Squadron =

Unit of the United States Air Force

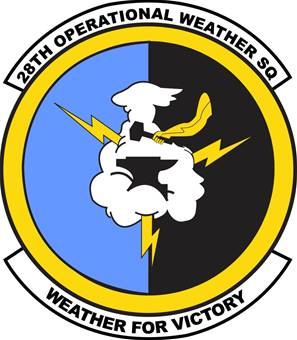
- 28th Operational Weather Squadron emblem
- Active: 5 June 1945 - 9 November 1945; 1 March 1949 - 1 July 1971; 1 July 1980 - 30 September 1991; 17 February 1999 - present
- Country: United States
- Branch: United States Air Force
- Part of: 1st Weather Group

The 28th Operational Weather Squadron (28th OWS), is an operational weather squadron responsible for supporting USCENTCOM operations.

== Mission ==
The 28th Operational Weather Squadron is responsible for producing and disseminating mission planning and execution weather analyses, forecasts, and briefings for US Air Force, USCENTCOM forces.

This weather squadron is responsible for base or post forecasting, developing weather products, briefing transient aircrews, and weather warnings for all of their geographical units. Using automatic observing systems located at all military installations and communicating with their combat weather flights, the squadron is able to 'watch' the weather in their entire area of responsibility from one central location.

== History ==
On 26 January 1945, the commanding general of the US Army Air Forces in the Pacific requested two mobile weather squadrons be activated for projected land operations in the theater's forward area. The Weather Wing constituted the 27th and 28th Weather Squadrons on 30 May 1945. The squadrons activated at Seymour Johnson Field, North Carolina, on 5 June 1945, and underwent intensive training.

The squadrons were ordered to port for movement to the Pacific in August 1945, but the order was soon thereafter rescinded when Japan capitulated. Both squadrons were inactivated on 9 November 1945.

The 28th Weather Squadron was reactivated on 1 March 1949, at Bushy Park, England to provide weather services for US Air Force and US Army units within the British Isles. The squadron was assigned to the 2105th Air Weather Group, redesignated the 2058th Air Weather Wing in October 1951.

The 28th's predominant customer was the 3d Air Division which was activated in 1948 under the command of then-Maj Gen Leon W. Johnson. Maj Gen Leon W. Johnson, a World War II Medal of Honor recipient, was a member of the initial cadre of officers assigned to the US Air Corps weather service when it was formed in 1937.

The headquarters of the 28th Weather Squadron was relocated to South Ruislip, England, near 3d Air Division headquarters, on 7 June 1949; but returned to Bushy Park in March 1951. The headquarters moved to RAF Northolt, England, on 24 October 1962.

The 28th was reassigned to the 2d Weather Wing on 8 February 1954, in concert with an Air Weather Service overseas wing reorganization. The 28th Weather Squadron's emblem was in use by 1952. The Air Force officially approved its use on 10 April 1959.

The 28th Weather Squadron was one of seven weather squadrons eliminated as part of an Air Force directed Military Airlift Command programming action to reduce Air Weather Service command elements. It was inactivated on 1 July 1971, and its detachments were assigned to the 31st Weather Squadron.

Air Weather Service commander Brig Gen Albert J. Kaehn, Jr. approved a reorganization plan in 1979 that included reactivation of the 28th Weather Squadron, which he officiated on 1 July 1980, at RAF Mildenhall, England. Detachments of the 28th at Lakenheath, Bentwaters, Woodbridge, Mildenhall, Upper Heyford, Fairford, and Alconbury Royal Air Force stations were activated simultaneously.

With the Air Force-directed divestiture of Air Weather Service "to give mission commanders ownership of their weather support resources", the 28th Weather Squadron and its detachments were again inactivated on 30 September 1991.

Under the Air Force Weather re-engineering effort, the 28th Weather Squadron was redesignated the 28th Operational Weather Squadron on 5 February 1999. The 28th was activated at Shaw Air Force Base, South Carolina, on 17 February 1999, and assigned to the Air Combat Command's 609th Air Operations Group, severing its deep roots planted in England during the Cold War.

On 20 July 2006, the 28th Operational Weather Squadron was split into two entities: the 28th Operational Weather Squadron, which maintained USCENTCOM functions; and the 9th Operational Weather Squadron, which continued CONUS-based operations. The 9th Operational Weather Squadron dissolved in 2008 and CONUS functions were relocated to the 26th Operational Weather Squadron, Barksdale AFB, Louisiana. Currently the 28th Operational Weather Squadron is the only OWS assigned to Shaw AFB, South Carolina. Additionally, as of 2010 it is the only OWS in the United States Air Force that focuses specifically on USCENTCOM military meteorology and product development.

=== Personnel and resources ===
The 28th Operational Weather Squadron's manning consisted of active duty, deployed in-place OL-E, reserve, civilian and contract personnel and is located on Shaw Air Force Base, South Carolina.

== Lineage ==
- Constituted 28th Weather Squadron on 30 May 1945
- Activated on 5 June 1945
- Inactivated on 9 November 1945
- Activated on 1 March 1949
- Inactivated on 1 July 1971
- Activated on 1 July 1980
- Inactivated on 30 September 1991
- Redesignated 28th Operational Weather Squadron on 5 February 1999
- Activated on 17 February 1999
- Portions redesignated 9th Operational Weather Squadron on 20 July 2006
- Inactivated 9th Operational Weather Squadron in 2007

== Duty assignments ==
List of duty assignments and parent units from 1945 to present.

- Seymour Johnson Field, North Carolina, Army Air Forces Weather Wing, 5 June 1945 – 9 November 1945
- Bushy Park, England, 2105th Air Weather Group (later, 2058th Air Weather Wing), 1 March 1949 – 7 June 1949
- South Ruislip, England, 2105th Air Weather Group (later, 2058th Air Weather Wing), 7 June 1949 – 22 March 1951
- Bushy Park, England, Air Weather Group (later, 2058th Air Weather Wing), 22 March 1951 – 8 February 1954
- Bushy Park, England, 2nd Weather Wing, 8 February 1954 – 24 October 1962
- RAF Northolt, England, 2nd Weather Wing, 24 October 1962 – 1 July 1971
- RAF Mildenhall, England, 2nd Weather Wing, 1 July 1980 – 30 September 1991
- Shaw Air Force Base, South Carolina, 609th Air Operations Group, 17 February 1999 – 20 July 2006
- Shaw Air Force Base, South Carolina, 9th Air Force, 20 July 2006 – present

== Awards ==
- Fawbush-Miller Award 2001–2003, 2005
- Air Force Outstanding Unit Award for periods: 1 January 1968 – 31 December 1969; 1 July 1982 – 30 June 1984; 1 July 1990 – 30 September 1991; 1 June 2004 - 31 May 2006; 1 June 2006 – 31 May 2007.
