= 26th Operational Weather Squadron =

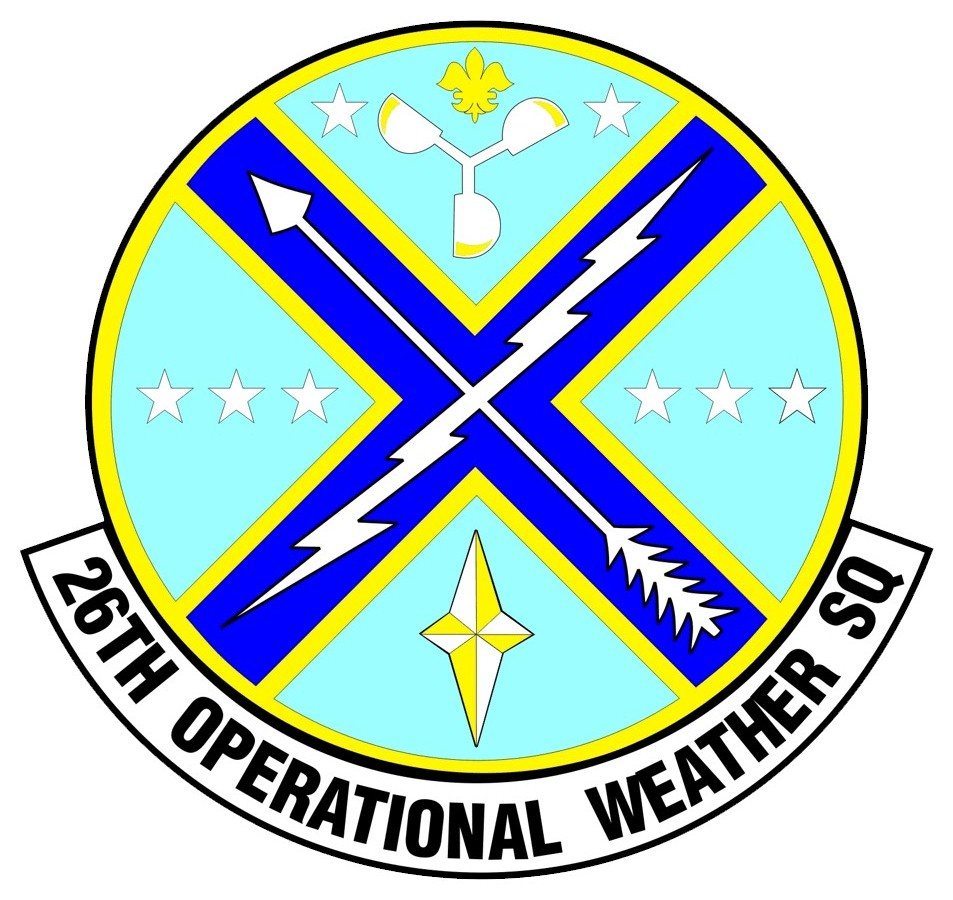
- 26th Operational Weather Squadron Patch
- Active: 1943 – present
- Country: United States of America
- Branch: US Air Force
- Type: Squadron
- Part of: Air Force Weather Agency
- Garrison/HQ: Barksdale AFB
- Nickname(s): Bayou Bandits
- Decorations: Air Force Outstanding Unit Award

The 26th Operational Weather Squadron (26 OWS), based out of Barksdale Air Force Base, Louisiana, is the United States Air Force meteorological squadron responsible for the Southeastern United States. The current states in the Area of Responsibility (AOR) include Kansas, Missouri, Oklahoma, Arkansas, Texas, Louisiana, Mississippi, Tennessee, Alabama, Georgia, Florida, and the Carolinas.

== Mission ==
The 26th Operational Weather Squadron is responsible for producing and disseminating mission planning and execution weather analyses, forecasts, and briefings for Air Force, Army, Navy, Marines, Guard, Reserve, USSTRATCOM, and USNORTHCOM forces operating at 134 DoD installations and facilities in those states, providing weather intelligence to protect over 160 billion dollars in assets. The 26th Operational Weather Squadron provides weather forecasts, warnings, and briefings to all Air Force and Army forces operating in the Southeast United States.

Formally train airmen to be forecaster apprentices and weather officers.

This weather squadron is responsible for base or post forecasting, developing weather products, briefing transient aircrews, and weather warnings for all of their geographical units. Using automatic observing systems located at all military installations and communicating with their weather flights, the squadron is able to 'watch' the weather in their entire area of responsibility from one central location.

The Operational Weather Squadron is the first place a newly schooled weather apprentice will report. At the squadron, working alongside a seasoned weather professional, the forecaster is trained in all aspects of Air Force meteorology, from pilot briefing to tactical forecasting. The current OWS's are located at Davis-Monthan AFB, Scott AFB, Hickam AFB, Shaw AFB, and Sembach AB (now moved to Kapuan AB).

The weather squadron works closely with the weather flights and detachments they support to ensure a flawless exchange of weather information necessary to protect lives and resources, and execute the Air Force and Army missions for units assigned to their AOR.

== Personnel and resources ==
26th Operational Weather Squadron's manning consists of active duty and government civilian personnel, and is under the 1st Weather Group, Offutt Air Force Base, Nebraska.

== Lineage ==
Activations and inactivations of the 26th Weather Squadron, and 26th Operational Weather Squadrons.

- Constituted 26th Weather Squadron on 30 September 1943
- Activated on 10 October 1943
- Disbanded on 3 June 1944
- Reconstituted on 18 May 1948
- Activated on 1 June 1948
- Inactivated on 30 June 1972
- Activated on 1 January 1975
- Inactivated on 31 July 1991
- Redesignated 26th Operational Weather Squadron on 5 February 1999
- Activated on 1 October 1999

== Duty assignments ==
List of duty assignments and parent units from 1945 to present.

- Orlando Army Air Base, Florida, Army Air Forces School of Applied Tactics (later, Army Air Forces Tactical Air Center), 10 October 1943 – 3 June 1944
- Brookley Air Force Base, Alabama, 104th Weather Group (later, 2104th Air Weather Group), 1 June 1948 – 24 October 1950
- Brookley Air Force Base, Alabama, 2059th Air Weather Wing, 24 October 1950 – 10 September 1951
- Barksdale Air Force Base, Louisiana, 2059th Air Weather Wing, 10 September 1951 – 16 September 1951
- Barksdale Air Force Base, Louisiana, 2101st Air Weather Group, 16 September 1951 – 20 April 1952
- Barksdale Air Force Base, Louisiana, 1st Weather Group, 20 April 1952 – 8 October 1956
- Barksdale Air Force Base, Louisiana, 3rd Weather Wing, 8 October 1956 – 30 June 1972
- Barksdale Air Force Base, Louisiana, 3rd Weather Wing, 1 January 1975 – 31 July 1991
- Barksdale Air Force Base, Louisiana, 608th Air Operations Group 1 October 1991 – 22 June 2006
- Barksdale Air Force Base, Louisiana, 1st Weather Group, 22 June 2006 – present

== Emblem ==
Approved on 3 November 1965

The emblem is symbolic of the squadron and its mission. Against the background of sky, the primary theater of Air Force operations, the blue saltire bearing the arrow crossed by the lightning bolt commemorates the squadron's history and organization in September 1943. The fleur-de-lis and anemometer, emblematic of weather service, with the star compass signifies the unit's participation in the weather service global mission. The star compass also denotes the squadron's Air Force Outstanding Unit Award. The placement of the stars two and six allude to the squadron's numerical designation.

== History ==
In response to a request from the commanding general of the Army Air Forces School of Applied Tactics for an assigned weather squadron, the Army Air Forces headquarters constituted today's 26th Operational Weather Squadron on 30 September 1943, as the 26th Weather Squadron. The squadron activated on 10 October 1943, under the command of Lt Col Chester W. Cecil, Jr., at Orlando Army Air Base, Florida. In addition to his squadron duties, Colonel Cecil served as the 26th Weather Regional Control Officer and staff weather officer for the Army Air Forces School of Applied Tactics.

Later redesignated the Army Air Forces Tactical Air Center, the School of Applied Tactics was activated on 16 October 1942, to train selected officers under simulated combat conditions. More than 840 weather officers attended the Weather Staff Officer course conducted at the School of Applied Tactics during World War II.

The Army Air Forces disbanded the 26th Weather Squadron on 3 June 1944, and Squadron personnel were transferred in-place to Squadron B, 902nd Army Air Forces Base Unit.

The newly independent United States Air Force reconstituted the 26th Weather Squadron on 18 May 1948. On 1 June, it activated the 26th at Brookley Air Force Base, near Mobile, Alabama. The Air Force assigned the 26th to the 104th Weather Group, which was later redesignated the 2104th Air Weather Group.

The 26th Weather Squadron was soon indirectly supporting Operation VITTLES as Brookley transports, including the limited production C-74 Globemaster I, began participating in the Berlin Airlift.

The 26th Weather Squadron was reassigned to the 2059th Air Weather Wing on 24 October 1950, as part of Air Weather Service’s restructuring to eliminate the Weather Groups.

The 26th Weather Squadron moved its headquarters to Barksdale Air Force Base, Louisiana, on 10 September 1951, in order to align itself with the headquarters of Strategic Air Command's Second Air Force at Barksdale for which the 26th had been given functional responsibility under Air Weather Service's new organizational scheme.

In continuing Air Weather Service reorganizations, the 26th was reassigned to the 2101st Air Weather Group on 16 September 1951, and to the 1st Weather Group on 20 April 1952. The squadron began its long association with the 3rd Weather Wing on 8 October 1956, to which it was assigned until it was inactivated on 30 June 1972.

The 26th was again activated and assigned to the 3rd Weather Wing on 1 January 1975. The 26th continued at Barksdale until the divestiture of Air Weather Service. The squadron was inactivated on 31 July 1991.

As part of Air Force Weather's re-engineering, the squadron was redesignated the 26th Operational Weather Squadron on 5 February 1999, and again activated at Barksdale on 1 October 1999, where it was assigned to Eighth Air Force's 608th Air Operations Group.

The 26th Operational Weather Squadron, Barksdale AFB, Louisiana, realigned under the 1st Weather Group, Air Force Weather Agency on 22 June 2006.

== Systems Flight ==
The 26th OWS Systems Flight is responsible for maintaining and upgrading all computer systems equipment locally owned and employed by the 26th Operational Weather Squadron. The Systems Flight consists of a Government Civilian personnel as well as Active Duty USAF Airmen with an AFSC of 3D0X2 (Cyber Systems Operator). The job for both GS and USAF personnel generally consists of standard network administrative tasks, i.e., system building, installation, integration, internetworking, intranetworking, and vulnerability assessment. The Systems Flight also functions as a communications focal point, performing small computer maintenance and ensuring the availability of computer services to the remainder of the squadron.

== Awards ==
- Air Force Outstanding Unit Awards for periods: 1 October 1960 – 31 January 1963; 1 July 1976 – 30 June

== See also ==
- List of United States Air Force weather squadrons
