= 30th Weather Squadron =

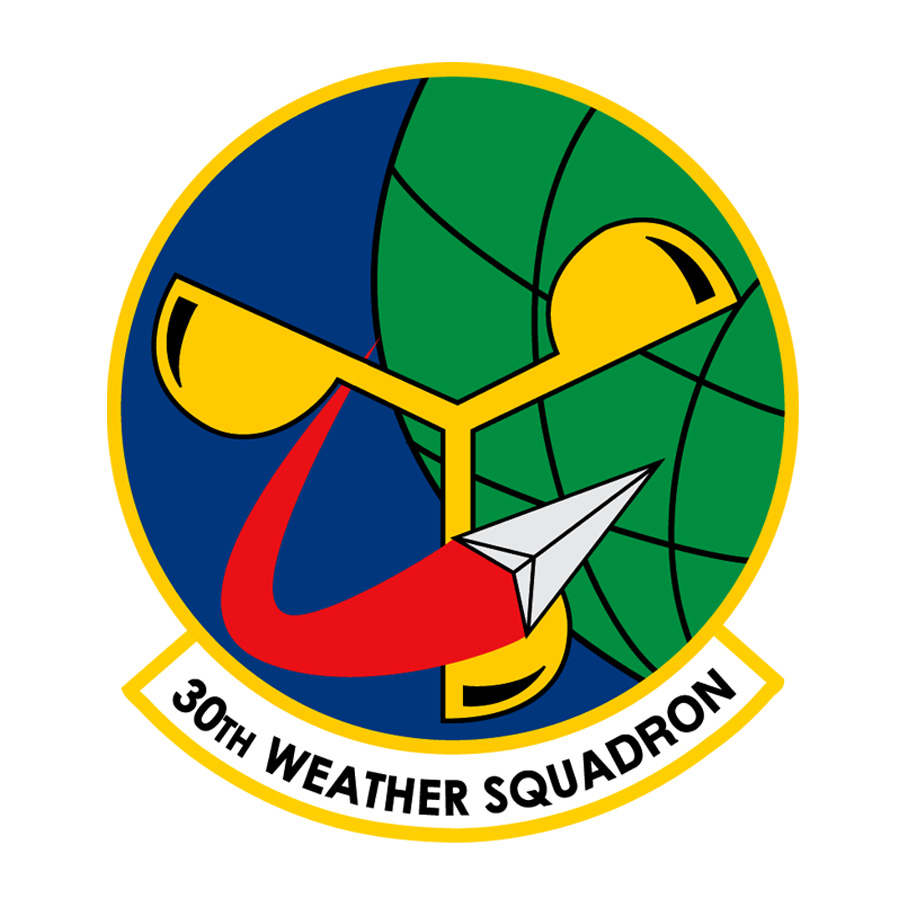
- 30th Weather Squadron emblem
- Active: 1945--present
- Country: United States
- Branch: Air Force (Weather Agency)
- Type: Squadron
- Role: Weather surveillance
- Part of: Air Force Space Command
- Garrison/HQ: Vandenberg Air Force Base, California

The 30th Weather Squadron was created on 29 August 1945, at Harmon Field. During the 1940s and 1950s it was moved across several bases in Korea and Japan, inactivated and reactivated before inactivation on 8 August 1959. As the Vietnam War began, the squadron was reactivated in 1962 at Tan Son Nhut AB where it remained until inactivation on 1 July 1971. Reactivated again in 1976 at Yongsan AIN, Korea it remained until 1 June 1992. One month later the squadron was reactivated a fifth time at the Vandenberg Air Force Base where it was under the 30th Operations Group. Following the 2011 inactivation, its meteorological operations were absorbed by the 30th Operations Support Squadron, which now handles weather forecasts, range operations, and airfield advisories on the base.

The squadron provided weather support for air operations on the base as well as space launches from 6 active launch complexes.

== Lineage ==
- Constituted as the 30th Weather Squadron on 29 August 1945

Activated on 20 September 1945
Inactivated on 9 November 1949

- Activated on 16 November 1950

Inactivated on 8 August 1959

- Activated on 5 October 1962 (not organized)

Organized on 8 November 1962
Inactivated on 1 July 1971

- Activated on 1 September 1976

Inactivated on 1 June 1992

- Activated on 1 July 1992

Inactivated 2011

=== Assignments ===
- 2d Weather Group: 20 September 1945
- 1st Weather Group: 1 August 1946
- 1st Weather Group (later 2100th Air Weather Group): 3 June 1948
- 2143d Air Weather Wing: 10 October 1949 – 9 November 1949
- 2143d Air Weather Wing: 16 November 1950
- 1st Weather Wing 8 February 1954
- 10th Weather Group: 18 February 1957 – 8 August 1959
- Military Air Transport Service, 5 October 1962 (not organized)
- 1st Weather Wing: 8 November 1962
- 1st Weather Group: 8 July 1966 – 1 July 1971
- 1st Weather Wing: 1 September 1976
- Fifth Air Force: 1 October 1991 – 1 June 1992
- 30th Operations Group: 1 July 1992 – 2011

=== Stations ===
- Harmon Field (later Harmon Air Force Base), 20 September 1945
- Andersen Air Force Base, 21 October 1949 – 9 November 1949
- Seoul, South Korea, 16 November 1950
- Taegu Air Base, South Korea, 22 December 1950
- Seoul, South Korea, 3 July 1951
- Osan Air Base, South Korea, 25 January 1954
- Moriyama Air Base, Japan, 9 May 1957
- Komaki Air Base, Japan, 5 July 1957
- Yamato Air Station, Japan, 10 March 1958 – 8 August 1959
- Tan Son Nhut Air Base, South Vietnam, 8 November 1962 – 1 July 1971
- Yong San Army Installation, Korea, 1 September 1976 – 1 June 1992
- Vandenberg Air Force Base, California, 1 July 1992 – present

== See also ==
- List of United States Air Force weather squadrons
