= 21st Operational Weather Squadron =

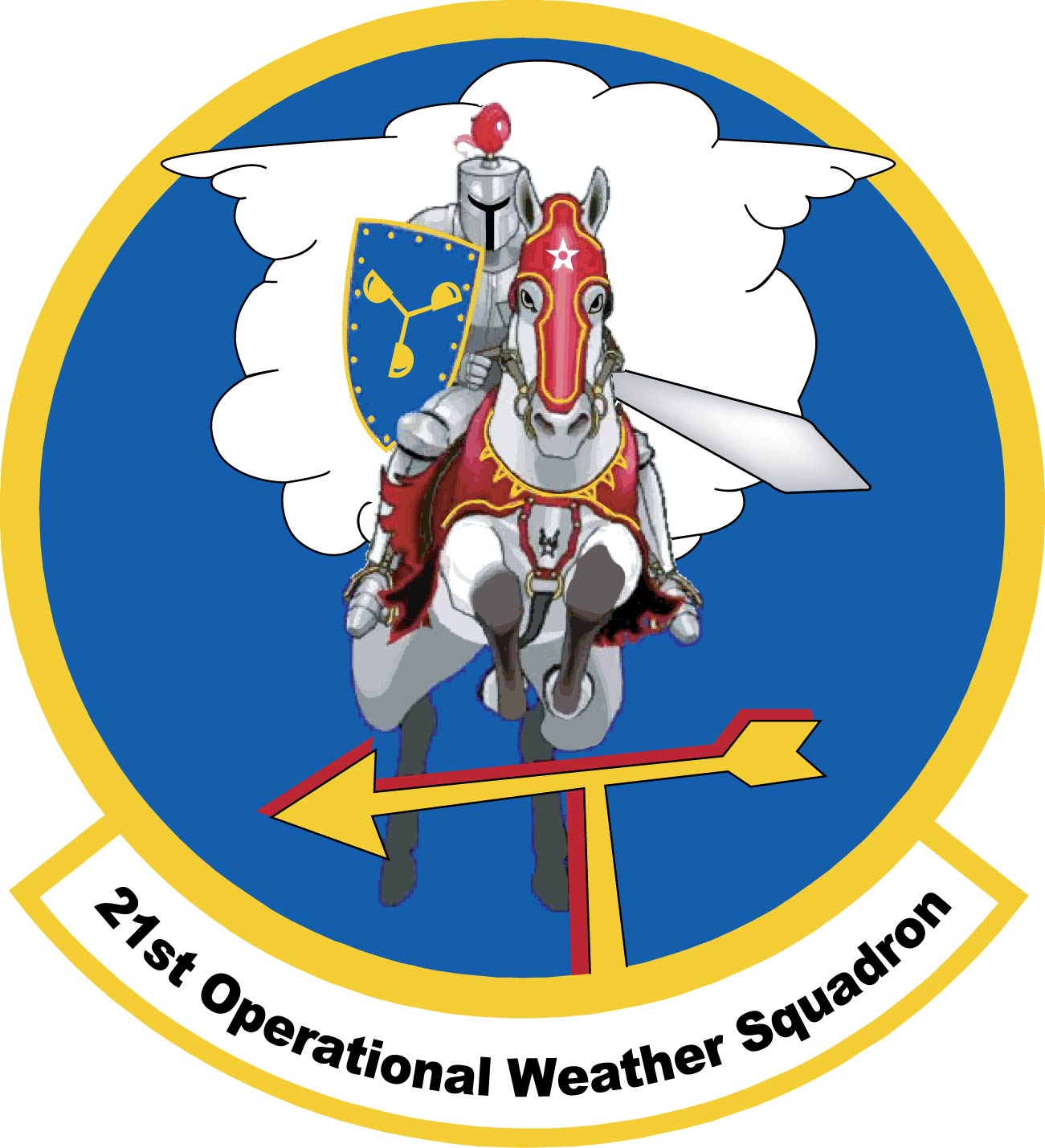
- 21st Operational Weather Squadron Patch
- Active: 1 December 1997—present
- Country: United States
- Branch: 557th Weather Wing
- Type: Squadron
- Role: Weather Surveillance
- Part of: United States Air Force/557th Weather Wing
- Garrison/HQ: Kapaun Air Station

The 21st Operational Weather Squadron provides weather support for all US Air Force and Army in the European and Africa Commands and is based at Kapaun Air Station, Germany.

== Mission ==
The 21st Operational Weather Squadron provides highly accurate, timely and relevant environmental situational awareness to Air Force, Navy, and Army Commanders operating in US European Command in partnership with NATO. The 21st OWS is responsible for producing and disseminating mission planning and execution weather analyses, terminal aerodrome forecasts, and briefings for Air Force, Army, SHAPE, EUCOM, AFRICOM, USAFE, USAREUR, SOCEUR, and NAVEUR forces operating at 491 DoD installations/sites encompassing 92 countries and 23M square miles within the Atlantic Ocean, Europe, Russia, Africa and the Middle East.

== Vision ==
Reliable, resilient, and forward-thinking joint warriors enabling military operations while converging with information warfare capabilities.

== Priorities ==
Reliable We will actively generate predictive weather and environmental analyses in support of the air, land, and maritime component commander in the planning and employment of Information Warfare capabilities.

Resilient We will foster a healthy and inclusive culture which starts with our front-line leaders setting the example and understanding the challenges the Airmen on their team face.

Forward-thinking We will seek opportunities to capitalize on our Airmen while modernizing and evolving our processes and training program to maintain our advantage.

== Personnel and resources ==
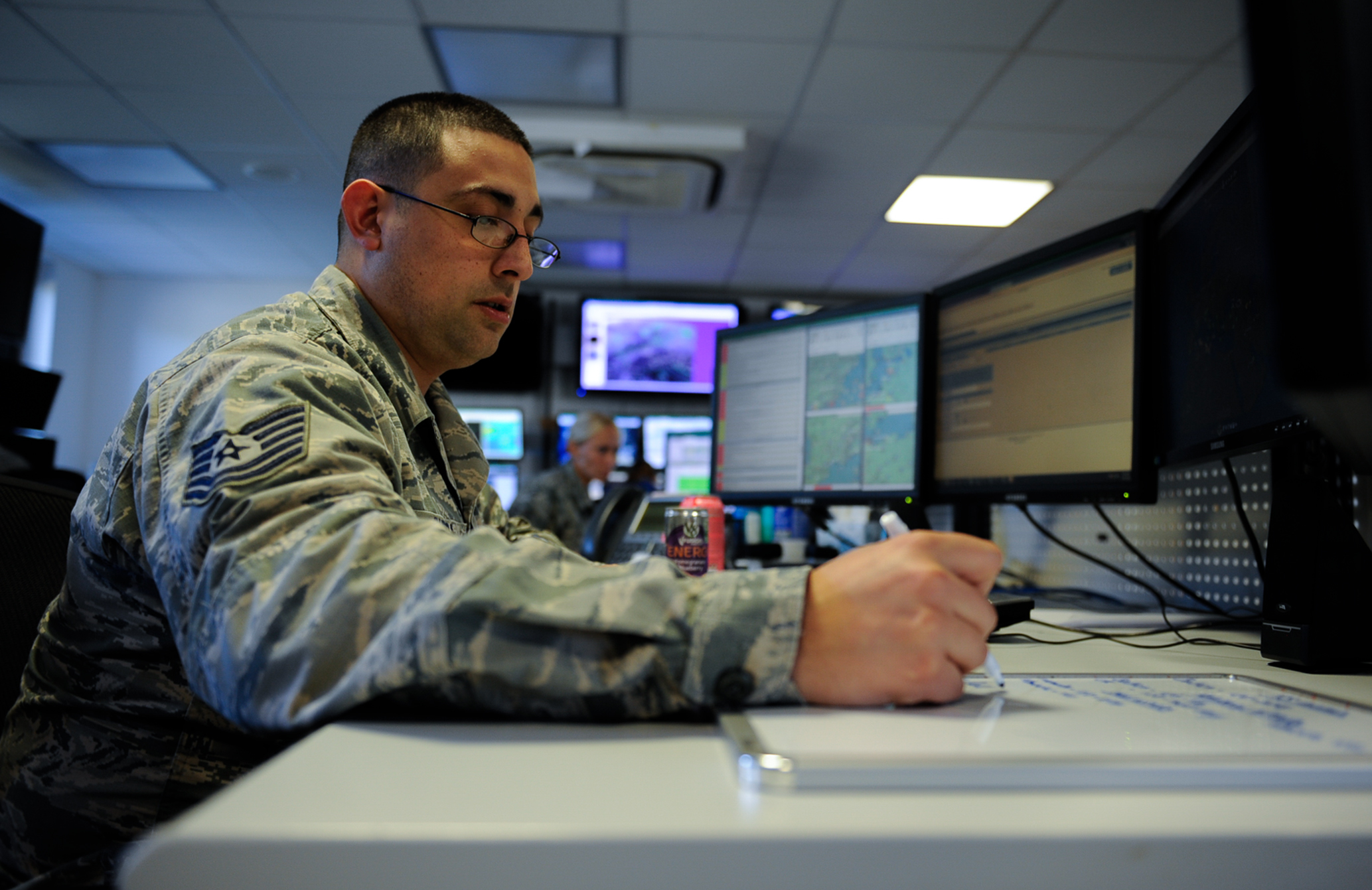
Technical Sergeant Justin Guerra of the 21st OWS at the Ramstein Air Base in Germany

21st Operational Weather Squadron's manning consists of active duty, civilian and contract personnel and is located on Kapaun Air Station, Germany, as an Air Combat Command tenant unit of Ramstein Air Base, Germany (USAFE).

== Lineage ==
Activations and inactivations of the 21st Operational Weather Squadron:

- 1 Dec 1997: Activated as a unit
- 17 Feb 1999: Redesignated USAFE Operational Weather Squadron

== Duty Assignments ==
List of duty assignments and parent units from 1997 to present.

- Sembach Kaserne, Germany, Headquarters USAFE (1 December 1997 – 23 April 2012)
- Kapaun Air Station, Germany (23 April 2012 – Present)

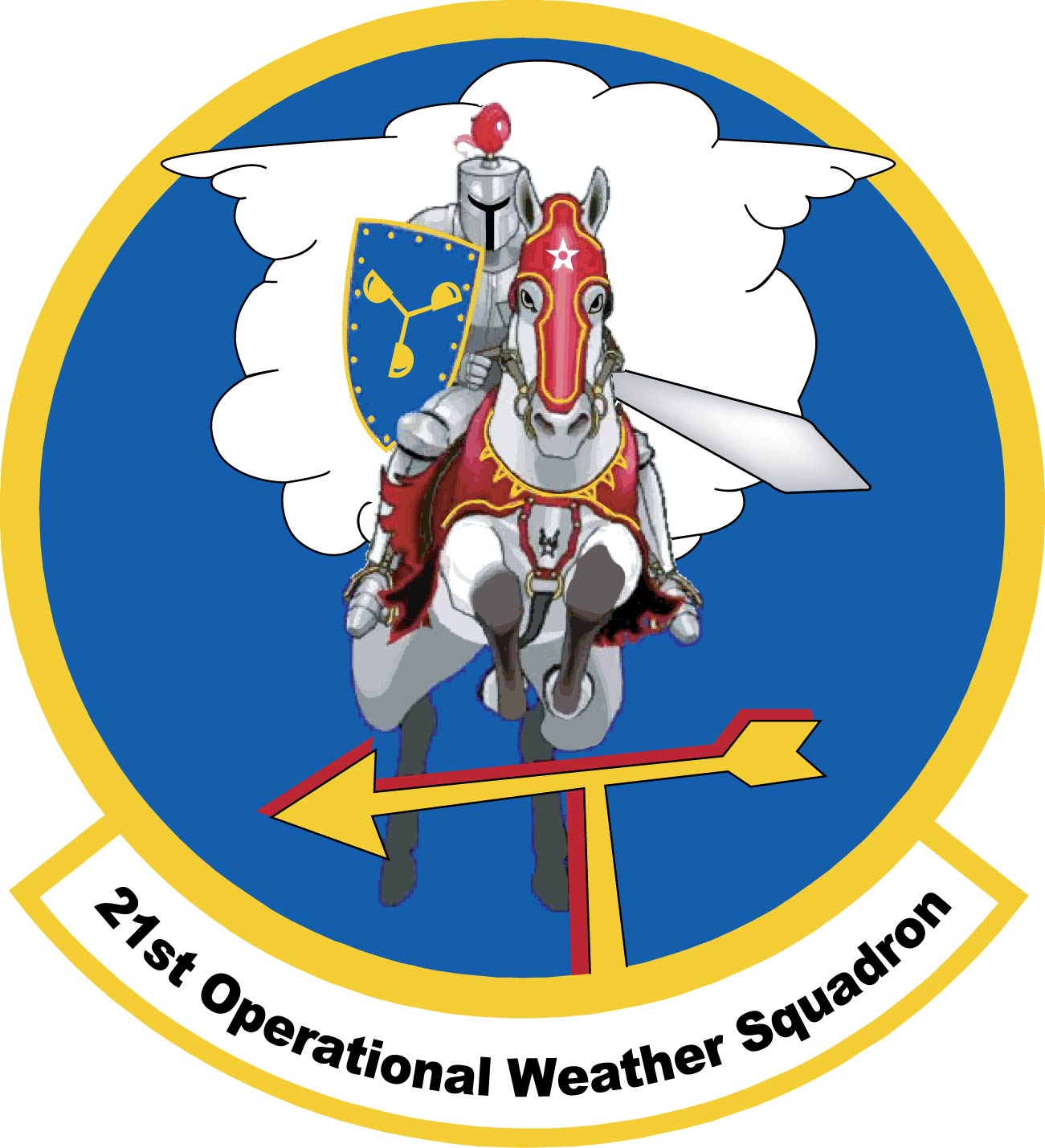
21st OWS Patch

== Emblem ==
The unit insignia was approved on 20 August 1998.

=== Meaning ===
Blue and yellow are the Air Force colors. Blue alludes to the sky, the primary theater of Air Force operations. The knight represents the unit's readiness and its dedication to support the warfighter and its role as a "keeper of peace". He leaps over a weather vane symbolizing a commander's ability to overcome adverse weather conditions due to accurate weather information provided by the squadron. The horse signifies the unit's key mission of carrying tailored intelligence information to operational customers and the ability to complete the Air Force mission. The lance carried by the knight denotes the squadron as the "tip" of weather forecasting services reaching into the theater to make a difference; the shield connotes the ability to safeguard those who may be in harm's way. The wind anemometer within the shield is a standard trademark for Air Force weather personnel and a key tool for the craft. The developing thunderstorm in the background symbolizes the weather hazards that may impede combat operations.

== Awards ==
The unit has received the following awards:

- Fawbush-Miller Award (1999, 2004)
- USAF Operational Weather Squadron of the Year (2005, 2008)
- 1 Weather Group, Operational Weather Squadron of the Year (2024)

== Commanders ==
- Lt. Col. Ralph Stoffler, 1997–1999
- Lt. Col. John Murphy, 1999–2001
- Lt. Col. Carolyn Vadnais, 2001–2003
- Lt. Col. Tim Hutchison, 2003–2005
- Lt. Col. John Shepley, 2005–2007
- Lt. Col. Brian Pukall, 2007–2009
- Lt. Col. David Andrus, 2009–2011
- Lt. Col. Eugene Wall, 2011-2013
- Lt. Col. Gerald Sullivan Jr., 2013-2015
- Lt. Col. Cedrick Stubblefield, 2015–2017
- Lt. Col. Eric Muller, 2017-2019
- Lt. Col. Jason Scalzitti, 2019–2021
- Lt. Col. Allen Little, 2021-2023
- Lt. Col. Alycia Hackenburg, 2023-2025
- Lt. Col. David DeMeuse, 2025-Present
