= 17th Operational Weather Squadron =

Unit of the United States Air Force

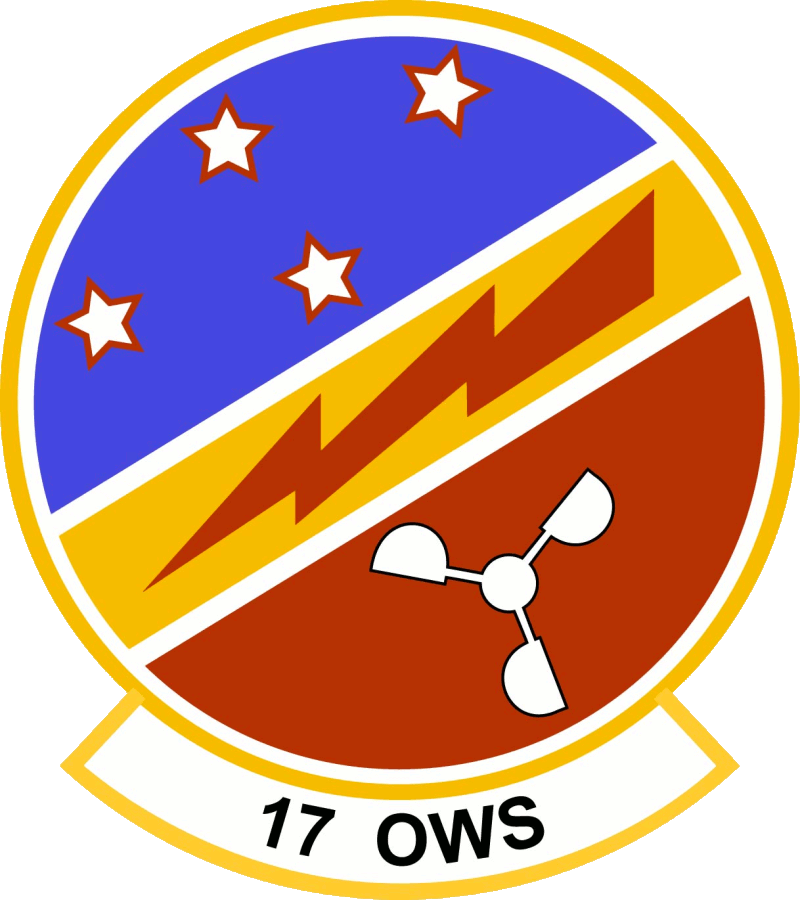
- 17th Operational Weather Squadron Patch
- Active: ???-Present
- Country: United States
- Branch: Air Force Weather Agency
- Type: Squadron
- Role: Weather Surveillance
- Part of: United States Air Force/Air Force Weather Agency
- Garrison/HQ: Hickam Air Force Base
- Motto: Fightin' Geckos... Fight's On!
- Mascot: Gecko

The 17th Operational Weather Squadron (17 OWS) is a unit of the military of the United States. Based at Hickam Air Force Base in Hawaii, it covers weather for the largest geographical area in the world.

== Mission ==
The 17th Operational Weather Squadron is responsible for producing and disseminating mission planning and execution weather analyses, forecasts, and briefings for Air Force, Army, Navy, Marines, Guard, Reserve, USFK, PACOM, PACAF, USARPAC, SOCPAC, and NAVPAC forces operating at 115 installations/sites over 110M square miles, within the Pacific theater of operations.

This weather squadron is responsible for base or post forecasting, developing weather products, briefing transient aircrews, and weather warnings for all of their geographical units. Using automatic observing systems located at all military installations and communicating with their combat weather flights, the squadron is able to 'watch' the weather in their entire area of responsibility from one central location.

The Operational Weather Squadron is likely the first place a newly schooled weather apprentice will report. At the squadron, working alongside a seasoned weather professional, the forecaster is trained in all aspects of Air Force meteorology, from pilot briefing to tactical forecasting.

== Personnel and resources ==
17th Operational Weather Squadron's manning consists of active duty, reserve, civilian and contract personnel and is located on Hickam Air Force Base, Hawaii.

== Lineage ==
Activations and Inactivations of the 17th Weather Squadron, and the 17th Operational Weather Squadron.

Constituted 17th Weather Squadron (Regional Control) on 31 Aug 1942
Activated on 18 Sep 1942
Disbanded on 10 Feb 1945
Reconstituted and redesignated 17th Weather Squadron, on 24 Jul 1969
Activated on 15 Jan 1970
Inactivated on 30 Jun 1972
Activated on 1 Apr 1980
Inactivated on 30 Sep 1991
Redesignated 17th Operational Weather Squadron on 12 Oct 2000
Activated on 27 Oct 2000.

== Duty Assignments ==
List of duty assignments and parent units from 1942 to present.

McClellan Field, California, Army Air Forces, 18 September 1942 – 26 October 1942
Auckland, New Zealand, Army Air Forces, 26 October 1942 – 17 January 1943
Noumea, New Caledonia, United States Army Forces in the South Pacific Area, 20 January 1943 – 1 July 1943
Noumea, New Caledonia, 13th Air Force, 1 July 1943 – 20 December 1943
Noumea, New Caledonia, United States Army Forces in the South Pacific Area, 20 December 1943 – 1 August 1944
Noumea, New Caledonia, Army Air Forces, Pacific Ocean Area, 1 August 1944 – 4 September 1944
Noumea, New Caledonia, 1st Provisional Weather Group, 4 September 1944 – 29 November 1944
Hickam Field, Territory of Hawaii, 1st Provisional Weather Group 29 November 1944 - 10 February 1945
Travis Air Force Base, California, 7th Weather Wing, 15 January 1970 – 30 June 1972
Travis Air Force Base, California, 7th Weather Wing, 1 April 1980 – 30 September 1991
Hickam Air Force Base, Hawaii, 502nd Air Operations Group, 27 October 2000 – present

== Emblem ==
Approved on 9 Jun 1982.

Blazon: The four stars and the blue background represent the Southern Cross constellation and the midnight, as observed in the area where the squadron is stationed. The red lightning flash against the yellow sky denotes the sudden tropical storms common to the region. The white anemometer, the universal symbol of weather forecasting, depicts the squadron's function.

== History ==
The 17th Operational Weather Squadron was activated as the 17th Weather Squadron on 18 September 1942, at McClellan Field, California.

The squadron shortly thereafter relocated to Auckland, New Zealand, where it was assigned to U.S. Army Forces in the South Pacific Area. In January 1943 the 17th relocated to Noumea, New Caledonia. It was reassigned to Thirteenth Air Force on 1 July 1943, but returned to the control of U.S. Army Forces in the South Pacific Area on 20 December 1943.

The squadron was assigned to Army Air Forces, Pacific Ocean Area on 1 August 1944, but reassigned to the 1st Provisional Weather Group on 4 September. In November 1944, the 17th moved to Hickam Field, Hawaii, where it was disbanded on 10 February 1945.

The 17th was again activated on 15 January 1970, at Travis Air Force Base, California, as part of the 7th Weather Wing. It was inactivated on 30 June 1972. The squadron was activated once again on 1 April 1980, at Travis. It was inactivated on 30 September 1991, as part of the divestiture of Air Weather Service. The 17th was redesignated the 17th Operational Weather Squadron on 12 October 2000, and activated on 27 October 2000, at Hickam, where it was assigned to the 502nd Air Operations Group. The 17th began operating alongside the Navy (Joint Typhoon Warning Center Detachment) in March 2010.

== Awards ==
Service Streamers. World War II Asiatic-Pacific Theater.

== See also ==
- List of United States Air Force weather squadrons
