= 25th Operational Weather Squadron =

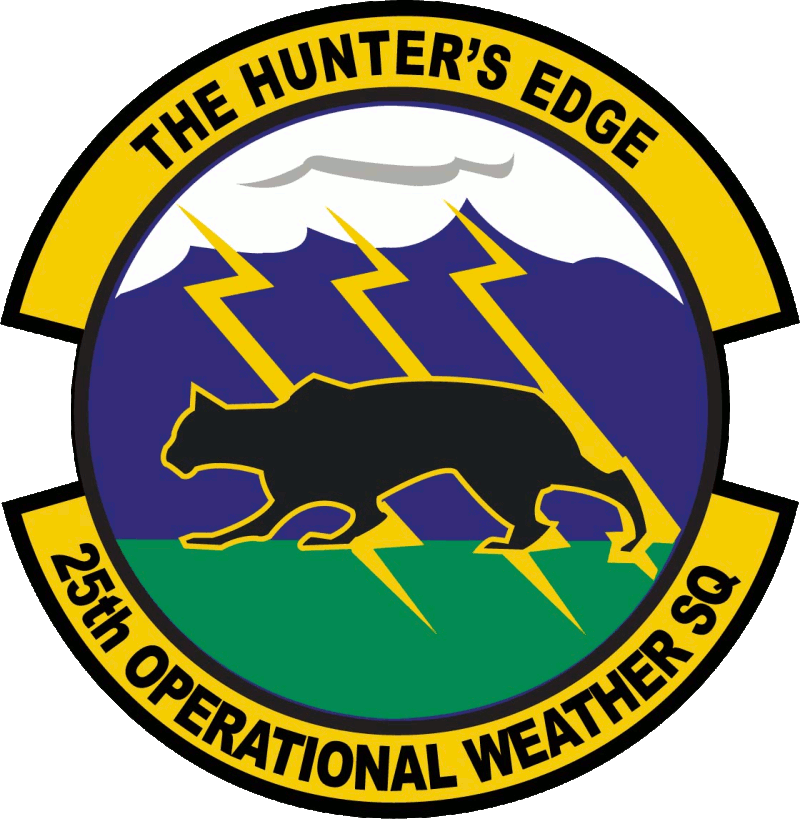
- 25th Operational Weather Squadron Patch
- Active: 1999 – present
- Country: United States
- Branch: 557 Weather Wing
- Type: Squadron
- Role: Weather Surveillance
- Part of: United States Air Force/Air Force Weather Agency
- Garrison/HQ: Davis-Monthan Air Force Base
- Motto(s): The Hunter's Edge
- Colors: Gold/Black
- Mascot(s): Bobcats

The 25th Operational Weather Squadron (25 OWS), based out of Davis-Monthan AFB, AZ, is the Squadron responsible for the Western United States; the current states in the Area of Responsibility (AoR) are Arizona, California, Colorado, Idaho, Montana, Nevada, New Mexico, Oregon, Utah, Washington, and Wyoming.

== Mission ==
The 25th Operational Weather Squadron is responsible for producing and disseminating mission planning and execution weather analyses, forecasts, and briefings for Air Force, Army, Navy, Marines, Guard, Reserve, USSTRATCOM, and USNORTHCOM forces operating at 68 installations/sites in an 11 state region of the Western United States.

This weather squadron is responsible for base or post forecasting, developing weather products, briefing transient aircrews, and weather warnings for all of their geographical units. Using automatic observing systems located at all military installations and communicating with their combat weather flights, the squadron is able to 'watch' the weather in their entire area of responsibility from one central location.

The Operational Weather Squadron is the first place a newly schooled weather apprentice will report. At the squadron, working alongside a seasoned weather professional, the forecaster is trained in all aspects of Air Force meteorology, from pilot briefing to tactical forecasting.

The weather squadron works closely with the combat weather flights they support to ensure a flawless exchange of weather information.

== Personnel and resources ==
25th Operational Weather Squadron's manning consists of active duty, reserve, civilian and contract personnel and is located on Davis-Monthan Air Force Base, AZ., Under the 1st Weather Group, Offutt Air Force Base, NE.

== Lineage ==
Activations and Inactivations of the 25th Weather Squadron, and 25th Operational Weather Squadrons:

Constituted 25th Weather Squadron on 28 October 1943
Activated on 1 November 1943
Disbanded on 7 September 1944
Reconstituted on 18 May 1948
Activated on 1 June 1948
Inactivated on 30 June 1972
Activated on 1 January 1975
Inactivated on 30 September 1991
Redesignated 25th Operational Weather Squadron on 5 February 1999
Activated on 1 April 1999.

== Duty Assignments ==
List of duty assignments and parent units from 1945 to present:

Patterson Field, Ohio, Army Air Forces Weather Wing, 1 November 1943 – 4 November 1944
Lynbrook, Long Island, New York, Army Air Forces Weather Wing, 4 November – 7 September 1944
Robins Air Force Base, Georgia, 104th Weather Group (later, 2104th Air Weather Group), 1 June 1948 – 24 October 1950
Robins Air Force Base, Georgia, 2059th Air Weather Wing, 24 October 1950 – 10 September 1951
Donaldson Air Force Base, South Carolina, 2059th Air Weather Wing, 10 September 1951 – 16 September 1951
Donaldson Air Force Base, South Carolina, 2102nd Air Weather Group, 16 September 1951 – 20 April 1952
Donaldson Air Force Base, South Carolina, 2nd Weather Group, 20 April 1952 – 18 September 1957
Waco, Texas, 2nd Weather Group, 18 September 1957 – 8 October 1965
Waco, Texas, 5th Weather Wing, 8 October 1965 – 23 May 1968
Bergstrom Air Force Base, Texas, 5th Weather Wing, 23 May 1968 – 30 June 1972
Bergstrom Air Force Base, Texas, 5th Weather Wing, 1 January 1975 – 30 September 1991
Davis-Monthan Air Force Base, Arizona, 612th Air Operations Group, 1 April 1999 – 6 July 2006
Davis-Monthan Air Force Base, Arizona, 1st Weather Group, 6 July 2006 – Present

== Emblem ==
Approved on 26 February 1944

The weather warrior symbolizes, simultaneously, the friendly aspect of weather when properly understood and used, as well as its destructive potentialities when it is not understood or heeded.

== History ==
The Army Air Forces constituted the 25th Weather Squadron on 28 October 1943. The squadron activated at Patterson Field, Ohio, and was assigned to the Army Air Forces Weather Wing four days later. The 25th moved to Lynbrook, Long Island, New York, on 4 November 1943, and was disbanded on 7 September 1944.

The U.S. Air Force reconstituted the 25th Weather Squadron on 18 May 1948, and activated it at Robins Air Force Base, Georgia. The squadron was assigned to the 104th Weather Group, later the 2104th Air Weather Group on 1 June 1948. It was reassigned to the 2059th Air Weather Wing on 24 October 1950.

The 25th moved to Donaldson Air Force Base, South Carolina, on 10 September 1951. The squadron was assigned to the 2102nd Air Weather Group on 16 September 1951. The 25th was reassigned to the 2nd Weather Group on 20 April 1952.

In 1953 in addition to operating the Troop Carrier Weather Center at Donaldson Air Force Base, the 25th was designated to test and develop doctrine for the provision of weather service for airborne forces and determine the requirements of and procedures for providing their service in cold weather operations. To validate its cold weather concepts the squadron participated in joint training activities such as Exercise SNOW STORM in upstate New York during the winter of 1953.

The 25th moved to Waco, Texas, and began its association with the Twelfth Air Force on 18 September 1957. In addition to providing meteorological services to Twelfth Air Force bases, the 25th supported U.S. Strike Command exercises, contingencies, and special missions. The squadron was assigned to the 5th Weather Wing when the wing was activated on 8 October 1965.

The 25th Weather Squadron moved to Bergstrom Air Force Base, Texas, on 23 May 1968, concurrent with the move of Headquarters, Twelfth Air Force from Waco to Bergstrom Air Force Base.

Air Weather Service inactivated the 25th Weather Squadron on 30 June 1972 as an Air Force budgetary reduction caused Air Weather Service to reduce squadron overhead. A Staff Weather Officer cell was established in its place to support Twelfth Air Force. This was short-lived as Air Weather Service again activated the squadron at Bergstrom Air Force Base and again assigned it to the 5th Weather Wing on 1 January 1975. In June 1975 Lt Col George E. Chapman, who was later promoted to brigadier general and served as commander of Air Weather Service from 1982 to 1988, took command of the 25th. In addition to numerous annual exercises, the 25th supported contingencies such as Operation JUST CAUSE in 1989.

The 25th was inactivated on 30 September 1991, as part of the divestiture of Air Weather Service. The squadron was redesignated the 25th Operational Weather Squadron on 5 February 1999, and activated at Davis-Monthan Air Force Base, Arizona, on 1 April 1999. It was assigned to the 612th Air Operations Group, renewing its association with Twelfth Air Force, which moved its headquarters to Davis-Monthan Air Force Base in 1993.

== Awards ==
Air Force Outstanding Unit Awards for periods: 1 July 1971 – 30 June 1972; 1 April 1978 – 31 March 1980; 1 July 1983 – 30 June 1985; 1 July 1988 – 30 June 1990; 1 May 1989 – 31 January 1990
