= Fawbush-Miller Award =

The Fawbush-Miller Award is a US Air Force award given for the most Outstanding Operational Weather Squadron for the entire Air Force. It is named after Robert C. Miller and E J. Fawbush, who pioneered forecasting tornadoes.

== See also ==
- List of meteorology awards
