= 14th Weather Squadron =

14th Weather Squadron
- Active: 1964–present
- Country: United States
- Branch: United States Air Force
- Role: Weather/Climatology
- Size: 65 authorized
- Part of: Air Combat Command: Sixteenth Air Force; 557th Weather Wing; 2nd Weather Group
- Garrison/HQ: Federal Climate Complex, Asheville, North Carolina, U.S.
- Decorations: Air Force Outstanding Unit Award; Air Force Organizational Excellence Award

Insignia
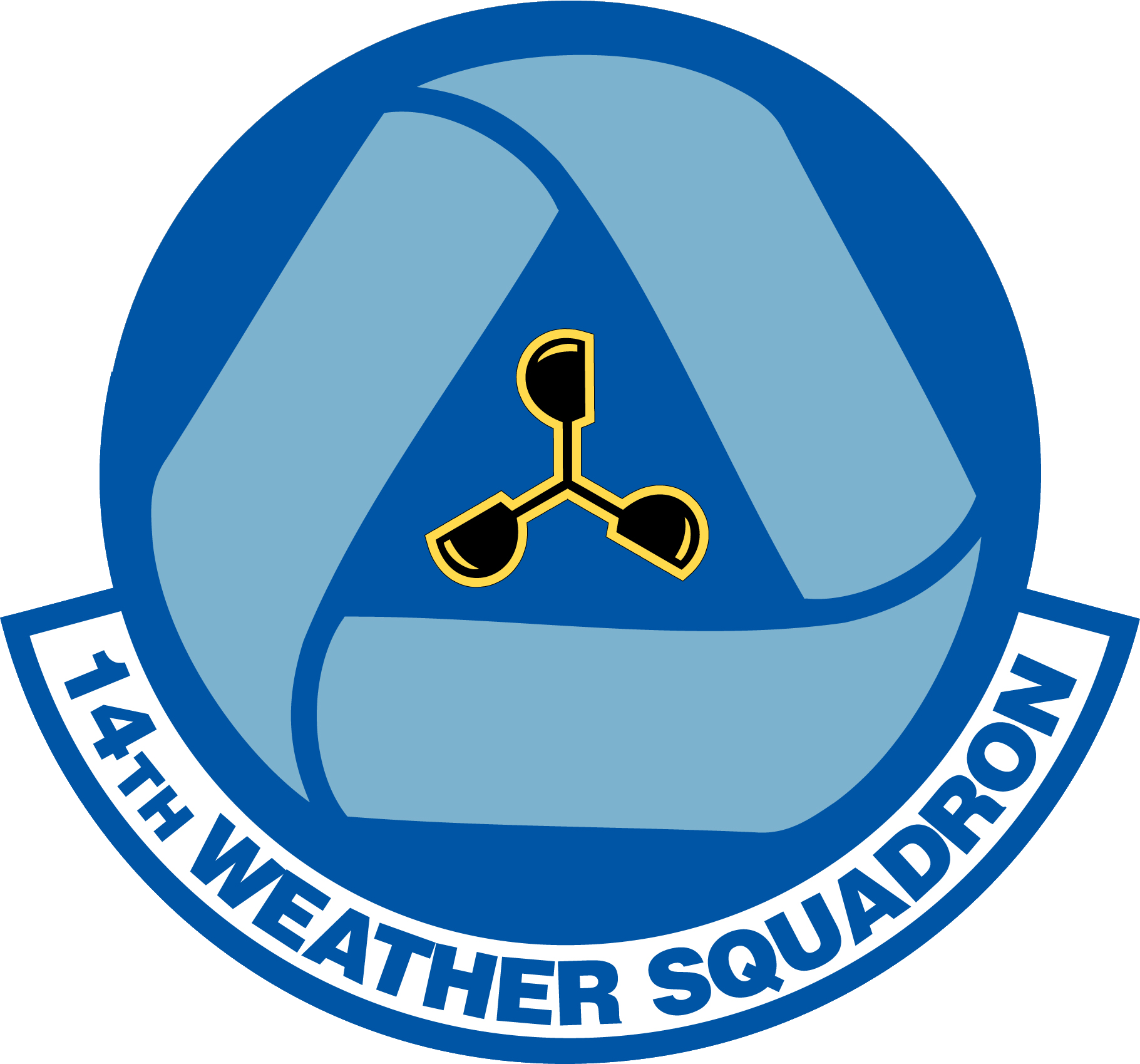
- 14th Weather Squadron emblem

The 14th Weather Squadron (14th WS) is a Geographically Separate Unit (GSU) of the 2nd Weather Group. The squadron is located in the Veach-Baley Federal Complex in Asheville, North Carolina. Its mission is military applied climatology. The 14 WS collects, protects and exploits authoritative climate data to optimize military and intelligence operations and planning in order to maximize the combat effectiveness of U.S. Department of Defense (DoD) personnel and weapons systems. It delivers environmental information worldwide to the United States Air Force (USAF), the Army, Unified Combatant Commands, the Intelligence Community, and the United States Department of Defense. The 14 WS also collaborates with the National Centers for Environmental Information (NCEI) (formerly the National Climatic Data Center).

== Mission ==
The mission of the 14 WS is to collect, protect and exploit authoritative climate data to optimize military and intelligence operations and planning.

== Organization ==
Divided into three flights, the Data Operations Flight, the Climate Operations Flight, and the System Flight, the 14 WS consists of more than 60 active-duty officers, enlisted personnel and civilians. The majority of the personnel at the 14 WS are meteorologists, weather technicians, cyber operators, and computer programmers.

== History ==
Punched cards, which are pieces of stiff paper that contain digital information represented by the presence or absence of holes in predefined positions, were a technical marvel when they came into prominence in the United States. The cards, developed by Herman Hollerith for use in the 1890 U.S. Census, made the use of historical weather records a practical means for determining the probability of future weather events and patterns. The British used punched cards successfully in about 1920 to extract wind data from ships' logs and to produce wind roses for ocean regions. The Dutch Meteorological Institute borrowed some of the British cards in 1922 and began their own weather analyses. Norway, France, and Germany soon followed. Then, in 1927, the Czech meteorologist, L.W. Pollak, placed small and inexpensive punch machines of his own design in every Czech weather station. As each observation was taken, it was punched on a card that was sent to a central tabulating unit for summary and analysis. Although the equipment for gathering and tabulating weather data has changed since then, the basic idea of the process has not.

The United States, where the punched card originated, was late to join the Europeans in collecting and tabulating weather observations. Fortunately, one of the "make-work" projects of the mid-1930s resulted in a sizable punched card climatic database. A 1934 Works Progress Administration (WPA) project resulted in an atlas of ocean climates, prepared by punching 2 million observations (taken from 1880 to 1933) onto cards and summarizing the results. Another 3.5 million observations were processed manually, a task that took 90 percent of the labor devoted to the entire project.

In 1936, the WPA also funded a project that resulted in the compilation and analysis of millions of surface and upper-air observations taken from 1928 to 1941. From this project came a number of climatological publications vital to the nation's preparation for World War II.

=== World War II ===
Although there was strong pressure for neutrality, military visionaries had seen the need to prepare for war even before 1937 when the Air Weather Service (AWS) itself was founded. The Army Air Forces Weather Research Center's Climatological Section was born at Bolling Field on 10 September 1941, one week after the U.S. Destroyer Greer was attacked by a German submarine off the coast of Iceland.

By 1941 the U.S. Weather Bureau had turned over most of its climatological records to the military. Most of the Weather Bureau's climatology had been produced by the depression era WPA project mentioned earlier. Even so, United States military climatology had a long way to go. Both allies and enemies had a strategic advantage during the war because they began their analyses of weather statistics much earlier. The Pearl Harbor attack on 7 December 1941 moved the collection and application of weather statistics to a top-drawer priority overnight. With weather observations and forecasts blacked out in hostile areas, planners turned to the climatologists with their questions. Where should air bases be located? How should their runways be oriented? What areas should heavy armor avoid? What should specifications for fuels, lubricants, landing mats, wires, buildings be? What times, dates, and locations are best for amphibious landings? What weather and winds aloft may be expected for bombing?

Because of the urgent need for climatic information, early in 1942 the WPA civilian punched card project was transformed into a support resource for the Armed Forces. By the end of the war 80 million cards were punched, many from pre-war weather observation forms of other countries. These cards were summarized into products, such as flying weather and low visibility summaries, which were essential for military operations. Throughout World War II, the AAF Weather Service maintained a Climatology Division with its staff at Headquarters U.S. Army Air Forces (USAAF) in the Pentagon. In May 1943 the division moved to Asheville, North Carolina where the AAF Weather Wing was organized. The same year the AAF Statistical Services Division was created at Winston-Salem, North Carolina to begin the routine storage and processing of military weather observations. Climatology was a factor in every major or minor WWII operation. The planning for every landing, mission, and offensive, including the D-Day Invasion in 1944 and the atomic bombing of Japan, required extensive climatological preparation and analyses.

=== Post-war ===
Although demobilization cut deeply into the Air Weather Service's wartime strength of nearly 19,000, the importance of climatology and its applications continued to be recognized. In early 1946, the military established a Climatology Unit at Gravelly Point, Virginia. In 1948, the Military Climatology Division moved to Andrews AFB, Maryland with Dr. Woodrow C. Jacobs as its chief.

The AAF Statistical Services Division (about 300 strong) moved to New Orleans in 1946 as part of the newly created New Orleans Tabulating Unit. This unit was a joint Weather Bureau, Air Force, and Navy climate center established after the war to unify U.S. civilian and military records, observing methods, and data management procedures. After the war, many punched card collections that were acquired from our allies or captured from our enemies were sent to New Orleans for processing (one set weighed 21 tons). The "Kopenhagener Schlussel" deck of 7 million captured German punched cards contained weather observations taken during WWII in Europe and the Middle East. Both the British Admiralty's and the Deutsche Seewarte's decks had millions of ship observations that went back to the 1850s.

=== 1950s ===
The Climatic Center at Andrews AFB continued to provide climatological data applications under various designations throughout the decade, with particular emphasis on the war in Korea and the strategic buildup necessitated by the Cold War. Detachment 3, Headquarters Air Weather Service (the Postweather Analysis Division) was organized on 1 May 1954 at Andrews. On 18 December 1957 the AWS merged the Climatic Analysis Division and the Data Integration Branch with Detachment 3 in spaces at Suitland, Maryland formerly occupied by the USAF Weather Central. On 1 April 1959, Detachment 3 (the Climatic Center) moved from Suitland to the Washington Navy Yard (Annex 2, at 225 D. Street, Southeast) on the Potomac River. At this time, IBM electronic accounting equipment installed at the Climatic Center allowed data processing directly from punched card to tape. Physical space necessary to store the growing punched card libraries was dwindling. As a result, the Statistical Services Division in New Orleans moved to Asheville, North Carolina in 1952 and was renamed the Data Control Division. In 1956, the first electronic computer became operational at Asheville, signaling the end for the high-speed electronic accounting machines (mostly IBM) used since World War II to process climatological data. Starting on 11 December 1957 the Climatic Center, USAF became a function within the 2150th Air Weather Squadron.

=== 1960s ===
AWS abolished the Directorate of Climatology at Headquarters Air Weather Service and discontinued Detachment 3, Headquarters Air Weather Service on 1 July 1960. The Climatic Center, USAF became a "named activity" but remained within the 2150th Air Weather Squadron, which assumed control of Detachment 3's operating location (the Data Processing Division) at Asheville. On 1 July 1961 the 2150th was redesignated as the 1210th Weather Squadron and on 1 May 1963 it was reassigned from Headquarters Air Weather Service to the 4th Weather Group. In 1964, an IBM 7040 computer was installed at the Climatic Center.

Effective 15 December 1964, the Climatic Center, USAF was redesignated the Environmental Technical Applications Center (ETAC) and the Data Processing Division became Operating Location 1 (OL-1, 1210 WS) under ETAC. The 1210th was reassigned to the 6th Weather Wing on 8 October 1965. On 8 July 1967 the center became an organization, the United States Air Force Environmental Technical Applications Center, (USAFETAC) and the 1210th was discontinued.

Computer upgrades continued. OL-1 bought a new IBM 705-III from the Department of Agriculture in 1965 and an IBM 7044 replaced the 7040 in 1966. In 1968, twin RCA Spectra 70/45 computer systems were commissioned at Asheville for joint use by OL-1 and the National Climatic Data Center (then the National Weather Records Center).

=== 1970s ===
In July 1970, OL-1 was renamed OL-A. By 1972, OL-A's card-punching function had been all but eliminated, resulting in a manpower drop from about 200 to 122. A further reduction brought OL-A's authorized civilian strength to 83.

USAFETAC was reassigned to Air Force Global Weather Central (AFGWC) on 1 August 1975. Effective 30 August 1975 the center transferred its flag from its Washington, D.C. Navy Yard Annex location to a location on the south side of Scott AFB, Illinois following a legal battle in Washington D.C. over where the Center should be located. The move, which took 13 months and put USAFETAC's project commitments about 2 years behind schedule, was declared complete on 31 October 1975 when the new PDP 11/45 and IBM 360/45 computers became operational.

In 1976, the merged HQ AWS and USAFETAC Library (the largest technical library dedicated to weather in the U.S) was designated Air Force Library #4414, and named the "AWS Technical Library". In 1979, the twin RCA computers at OL-A were replaced by UNIVAC 1100/10s. And, by the end of 1979, USAFETAC strength reached 232 people, with 149 of those employed at Scott AFB and 83 people employed at Asheville. By the end of the decade, the demand for climatological services remained extremely high, with the project backlog at nearly fifty thousand man-hours.

=== 1980s and 1990s ===
USAFETAC continued to use computer and electronic technologies as its computing power expanded exponentially through the '80s and '90s. When AWS was reassigned from Military Airlift Command, becoming a Field Operating Agency reporting to the USAF Director of Weather, USAFETAC was transferred from AFGWC to AWS on 9 July 1991. To better reflect the changing mission of the unit, USAFETAC was renamed the Air Force Combat Climatology Center (AFCCC) on 1 October 1995. AWS was redesignated as the Air Force Weather Agency (AFWA) on 15 October 1997.

With the end of the Cold War, AFCCC faced a 45% cut in overall manning (civilian positions were to be cut by 65%). This required an organizational restructure. On 17 May 1996 USAF announced that AFCCC would move from Scott AFB to Asheville, NC. This move was completed on 1 July 1998, with the unit transferring its flag to the Federal Building Complex alongside the National Climatic Data Center. OL-A was discontinued with this change of station and its mission and personnel were absorbed by the center.

=== 21st century ===
In another reorganization of the Air Force Weather Agency, AFCCC was redesignated Air Force Combat Climatology Squadron on 28 February 2007. This redesignation was short lived and the squadron became the 14th Weather Squadron on 19 October 2007 and was reassigned to the 2nd Weather Group. At the end of 2007, the authorized strength of 14 WS stood at 95 positions. The 14 WS possesses the DoD's most complete repository of worldwide weather data, receiving nearly 500,000 weather observations and satellite-derived wind profiles each day. Over the unit's history, customer support has expanded to include all of the military services, the joint commands, AF and Army major commands, U.S. intelligence agencies, the White House and foreign allied military organizations.

Today's military climatologists and analysts continue to fulfill customer requests similar to those of their predecessors as long as 60 years ago, but with improved techniques and equipment. Resources have grown from punched card data decks from the 1930s to many client/server networks and climatic databases.

14 WS is continuously upgrading to the latest data visualization techniques and other technologies as they become available. In 2013, the squadron transitioned from a 15-year-old legacy data management system to an improved Joint METOC Ingest System, instantly doubling the unit's observation intake to 1.5 million weather observations a day. In addition, the unit launched its inaugural Geographic Information System (GIS) capability to display applied Geospatial Climatology. In January 2014, the 14WS began a more robust climate prediction and seasonal outlook capability to meet additional DoD and Intelligence Community requirements.

On 27 March 2015, AFWA was redesignated as the 557th Weather Wing (557 WW), a Special Mission Wing assigned to 12th Air Force (AFSOUTH) under Air Combat Command. On 29 October 2019, the 557 WW was reassigned under the new information warfare Numbered Air Force, the Sixteenth Air Force (Air Forces Cyber).

== Awards and honors ==
Air Force Organizational Excellence Award

- 1 Sep 2004 - 30 Sep 2005
- 1 Oct 2001 - 30 Sep 2003
- 1 Oct 1999 - 30 Sep 2001
- 1 Oct 1998 - 30 Sep 1999
- 1 Oct 1995 - 30 Sep 1996
- 1 Sep 1993 - 30 Sep 1995
- 1 Jan 1991 - 30 Apr 1992
- 1 Jan 1988 - 30 Jun 1989
- 30 Apr 1985 - 1 May 1987

Air Force Outstanding Unit Award

- 1 Jan 2009 - 31 Dec 2010
- 19 Oct 2007 - 31 Dec 2008
- 26 Sep 1983 - 7 Sep 1984
- 1 Jul 1980 - 30 Jun 1982
- 1 Jul 1971 - 31 May 1973
- 8 Jul 1967 - 31 Mar 1968

== Emblem ==
BLAZON: On a disc Azure, an anemometer Sable fimbriated or environed by a tri-parted knot Celeste overall; all within a narrow border Blue. Attached below the disc, a White scroll edged with a narrow Blue border and inscribed "14TH WEATHER SQUADRON" in Blue letters.

SIGNIFICANCE: Ultramarine blue and Air Force yellow are the Air Force colors. Blue alludes to the sky, the primary theater of Air Force operations. Yellow refers to the sun and the excellence required of Air Force personnel. The tri-parted knot alludes to the worldwide data base archived on computer tape. The weather anemometer icon denotes the unit's mission.

== See also ==
- 2nd Weather Squadron
- 2nd Systems Operations Squadron
