= Field mill (disambiguation) =

A field mill is an instrument measuring electrical fields in the atmosphere.

It may also refer to:

- Field Mill, a football stadium in Mansfield, England
- A Field mill (carriage), a horse-drawn vehicle acting as a grinding mill used for supplying troops with ready-made food in pre-modern war campaigns
