= Launch commit criteria =

Conditions to be met for a rocket launch

Launch commit criteria are the criteria which must be met in order for the countdown and launch of a Space Shuttle or other launch vehicle to continue. These criteria relate to safety issues and the general success of the launch, as opposed to supplemental data.

== Atlas V ==
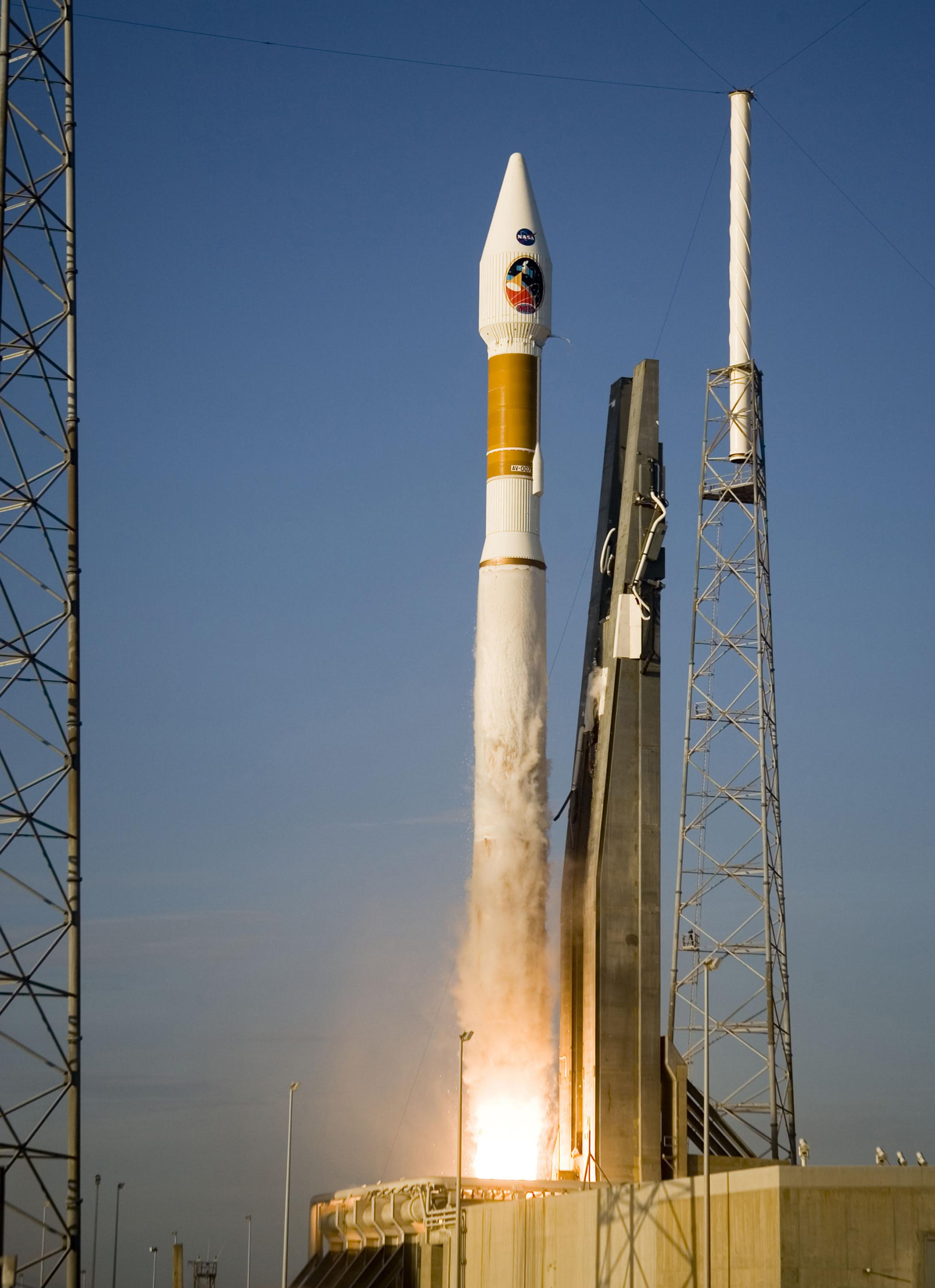
At Atlas V 401 launches with the Mars Reconnaissance Orbiter.

Launch commit criteria for Atlas V launches are similar to those used for the Atlas V launch of the Mars Science Laboratory

- wind at the launch pad exceeds 61 kilometres per hour; 38 miles per hour (33 kn)
- ceiling less than 1,800 metres (6,000 ft) or visibility less than 6.4 kilometres (4 mi)
- upper-level conditions containing wind shear that could lead to control problems for the launch vehicle.
- cloud layer greater than 1,400 metres (4,500 ft) thick that extends into freezing temperatures
- cumulus clouds with tops that extend into freezing temperatures within 5 to 10 miles (8.0 to 16.1 km)
- 19 kilometres (10 nmi) of the edge of a thunderstorm that is producing lightning for 30 minutes after the last lightning is observed.
- field mill instrument readings within 9.3 kilometres (5 nmi) of the launch pad or the flight path exceed +/- 1,500 volts per meter for 15 minutes after they occur
- thunderstorm anvil is within 19 kilometres (10 nmi) of the flight path
- thunderstorm debris cloud is within 5.6 kilometres (3 nmi) or fly through a debris cloud for three hours
- Do not launch through disturbed weather that has clouds that extend into freezing temperatures and contain moderate or greater precipitation, or launch within 9.3 kilometres (5 nmi) of disturbed weather adjacent to the flight path
- Do not launch through cumulus clouds formed as the result of or directly attached to a smoke plume

== Falcon 9 ==
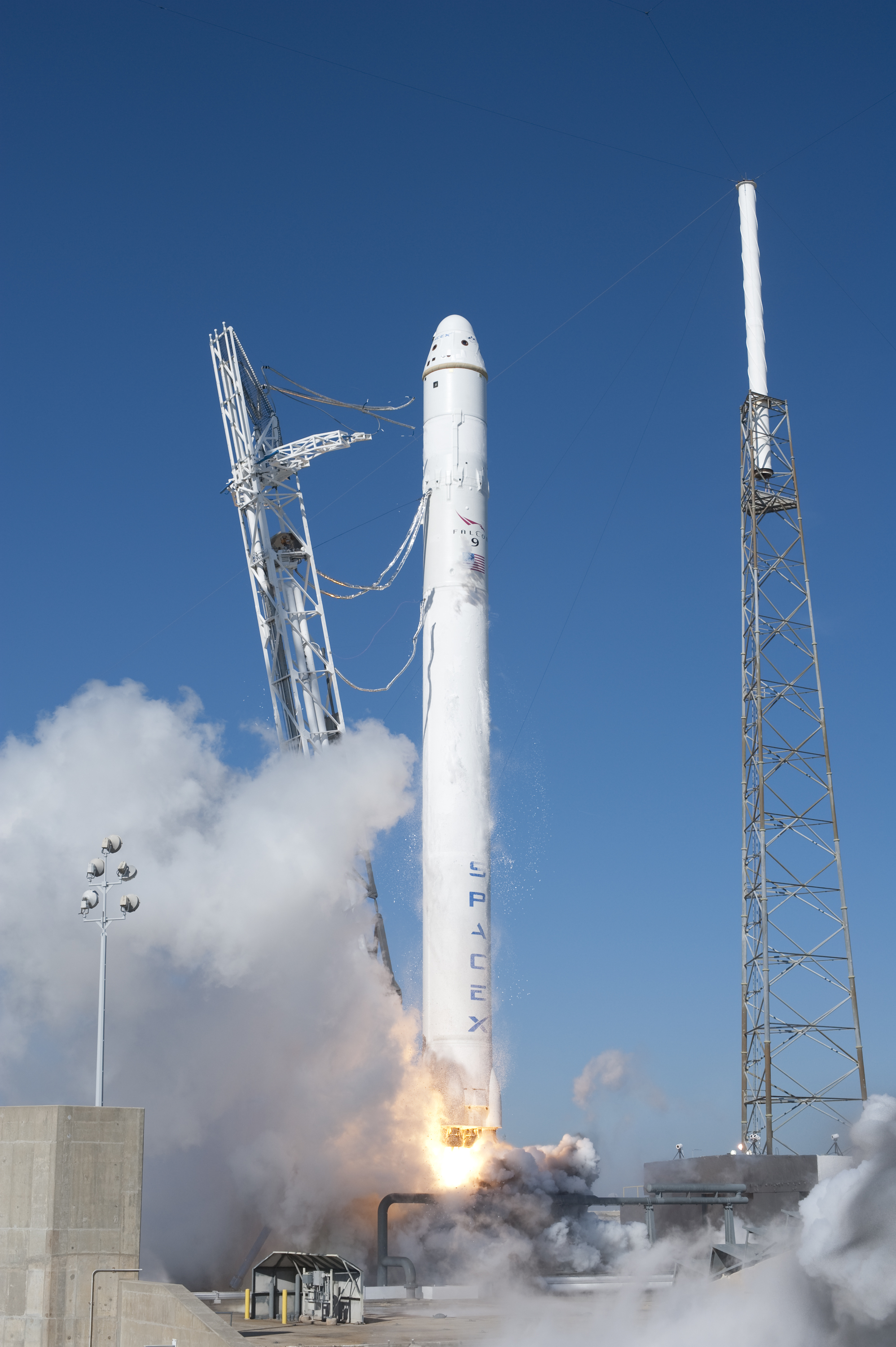
Launch of SpaceX COTS Demo Flight 1.

NASA has identified the Falcon 9 vehicle cannot be launched under the following conditions.

- sustained wind at the 162 feet (49 m) level of the launch pad in excess of 30 knots (56 km/h; 35 mph),
- upper-level conditions containing wind shear that could lead to control problems for the launch vehicle,
- launch through a cloud layer greater than 4,500 feet (1,400 m) thick that extends into freezing temperatures,
- launch within 19 kilometres (10 nmi) of cumulus clouds with tops that extend into freezing temperatures,
- within 19 kilometres (10 nmi) of the edge of a thunderstorm that is producing lightning within 30 minutes after the last lightning is observed,
- within 19 kilometres (10 nmi) of an attached thunderstorm anvil cloud,
- within 9.3 kilometres (5 nmi) of disturbed weather clouds that extend into freezing temperatures and contain moderate or greater precipitation,
- within 5.6 kilometres (3 nmi) of a thunderstorm debris cloud,
- through cumulus clouds formed as the result of or directly attached to a smoke plume.

The following should delay launch:

- delay launch for 15 minutes if field mill instrument readings within 9.3 kilometres (5 nmi) of the launch pad exceed +/- 1,500 volts per meter, or +/- 1,000 volts per meter,
- delay launch for 30 minutes after lightning is observed within 10 nautical miles (19 km; 12 mi) of the launch pad or the flight path.

Unique for Crew Dragon launches of the Falcon 9:

- weather downrange has a high chance or is violating splashdown limits (wind, wave, lightning, and precipitation limits) in case of a launch escape

== Space Shuttle ==
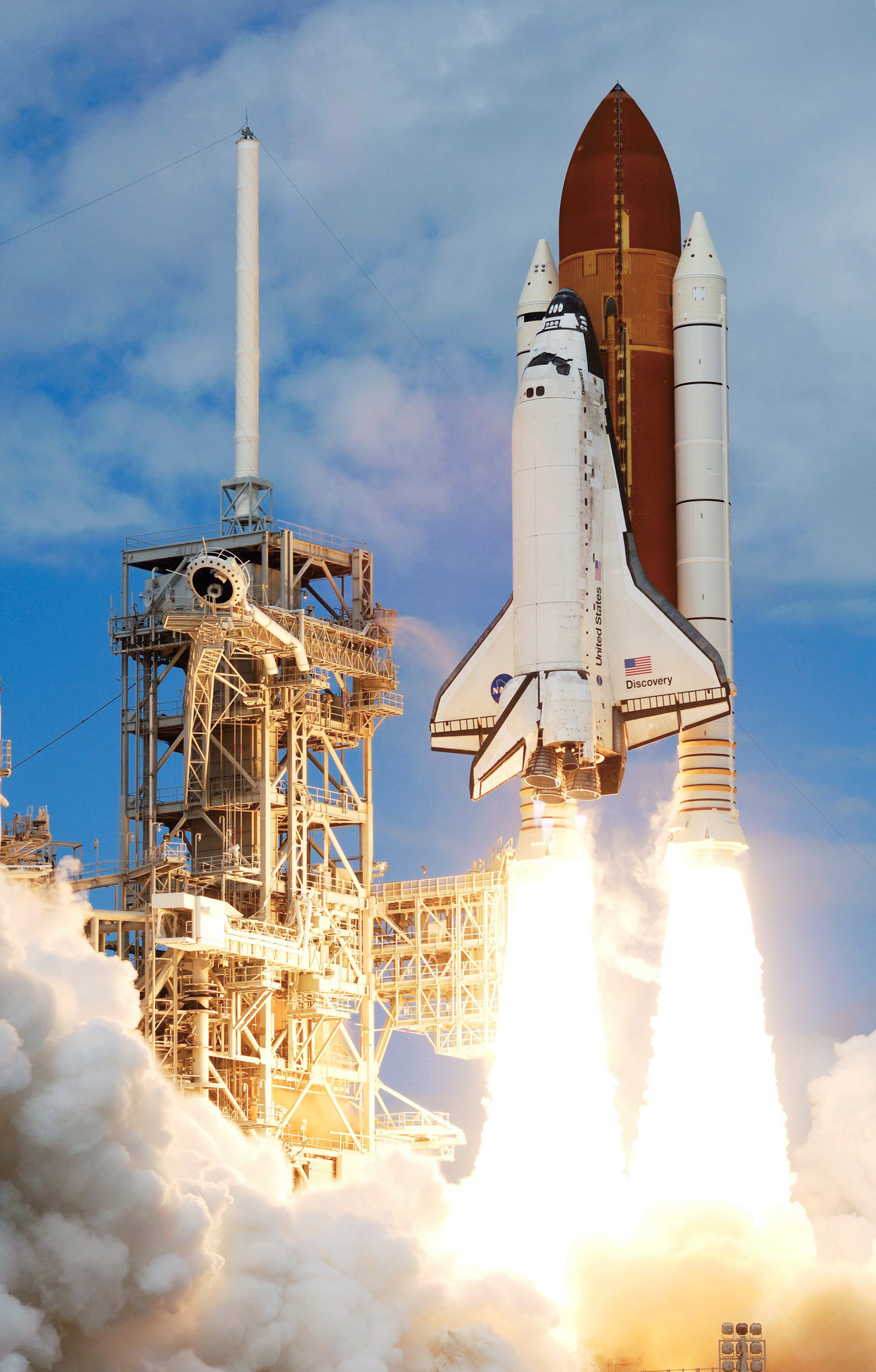
Space Shuttle Discovery launches on STS-120.

=== Weather ===
The weather conditions NASA required during countdown and launch were specified for "prior to loading external tank propellant" and "after loading propellant has begun". Weather forecasts were provided by the 45th Weather Squadron at nearby Patrick Air Force Base with concerns such as thunderstorms, winds, low cloud ceilings, or anvil clouds noted in the report.

=== Prior to loading propellant ===
Tanking was not to begin if the 24-hour average temperature had been below 41 °F (5 °C), the wind was observed or forecast to exceed 42 knots (78 km/h; 48 mph) for the next three-hour period, or there was a forecast to be greater than a 20% chance of lightning within five nautical miles of the launch pad during the first hour of tanking.

=== After propellant loading was underway ===
After tanking began, the countdown must not be continued, nor the Shuttle launched, if any of the following weather criteria were exceeded:

Temperature

Once propellant loading had begun, the countdown was to be stopped if the temperature remained above 99 °F (37 °C) for more than 30 consecutive minutes. The minimum temperature the countdown may proceed at was determined by a table of temperatures determined by wind speed and relative humidity ranging from 36 °F (2 °C) (high humidity, high winds) to 48 °F (9 °C) (low humidity, low winds). In no case was the space shuttle to be launched if the temperature was 35 °F (2 °C) degrees or colder.

Wind

For launch the wind constraints at the launch pad varied slightly for each mission. The peak wind speed allowable was 34 knots (63 km/h; 39 mph). However, when the wind direction was between 100 degrees and 260 degrees, the peak speed varies and may be as low as 20 knots (37 km/h; 23 mph).

Precipitation

None was allowed to exist at the launch pad or within the flight path.
