= Sagamore Hill Radio Observatory =

- Organization: 557th Weather Wing
- Location: Hamilton, Massachusetts
- Coordinates: 42.6323°N 70.8201°W
- Altitude: 59 meters (194 ft)

Telescopes
- RIMS: solar radio telescope array
- SRSR: solar radio telescope array

The Sagamore Hill Solar Radio Observatory is a solar radio observatory located in Hamilton, Massachusetts, that operates on a daily basis to obtain scientific observations of the Sun. It is a functional component of the Radio Solar Telescope Network (RSTN).

== History ==
It became apparent in the early 1960s that certain space weather events might interfere with the U.S. objective of putting a man on the moon. Foremost among these concerns was the possibility of a geomagnetic storm of solar origin. Metric Type II radio bursts, signatures of coronal shock waves or coronal mass ejections, were known to be commonly associated with solar flares. The United States Air Force Research Laboratory (AFRL) was thus assigned the task of developing and validating a network of ground-based solar observatories. AFRL established a worldwide network of sweep frequency recorders from which estimates of the shock speed in the corona could be made. The prototype was assembled and operated at Sagamore Hill during the early 1960s. The observatory began operating solar patrols in 1966.

The Air Force Geophysics Laboratory (AFGL) transferred operation of the observatory to the Air Force in October 1978. The observatory is now officially Detachment 2, 2nd Weather Squadron of the 2nd Weather Group of the 557th Weather Wing. The 2nd Weather Squadron currently operates other RSTN observatories at Kaena Point, Hawaii; San Vito dei Normanni, Italy; and Learmonth, Western Australia.

== Instruments ==
Instruments currently located at the Sagamore Hill RSTN site include the Radio Interference Monitoring Sets (RIMS) and the Solar Radio Spectrograph (SRS). The RIMS system consists of three dishes observing at eight different frequencies, while the SRS system consists of two antennas observing two different frequency bands.

The site previously included a 150-foot fully steerable antenna, which was installed in 1963 and moved to Millstone Hill in Westford, Massachusetts in 1978. In 1967, this parabolic dish was used to receive data from the solar research satellite OV1-5, and to conduct ionospheric research by receiving transmissions from the Intelsat 1 and ATS-1 satellites.

== See also ==
- Solar telescope
- List of astronomical observatories
