= 45th Weather Squadron =

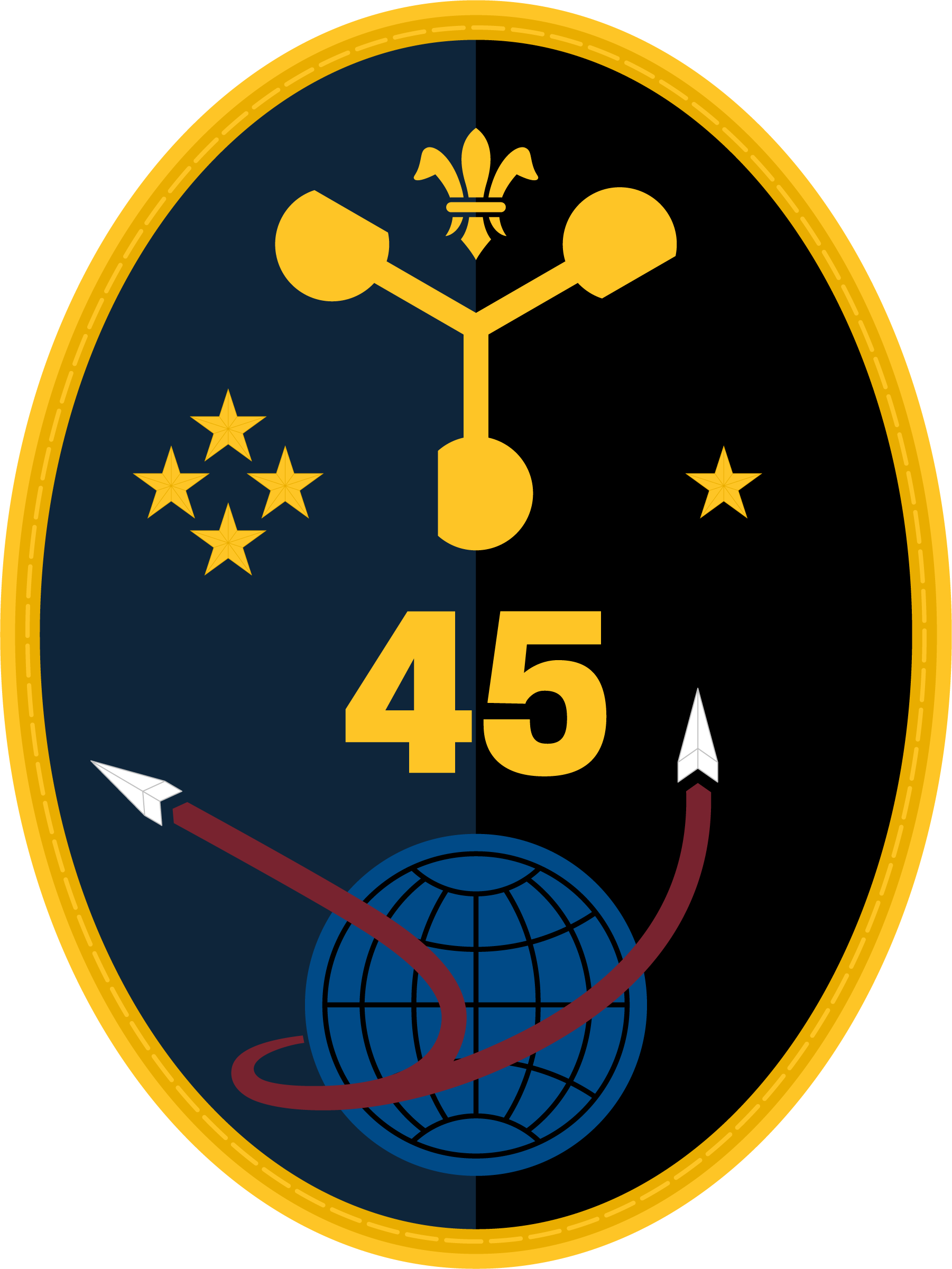
- 45th Weather Squadron Patch
- Active: 1991--present
- Country: United States
- Branch: United States Space Force
- Type: Squadron
- Role: Weather surveillance
- Part of: Space Launch Delta 45
- Garrison/HQ: Patrick Space Force Base, Florida

45th Weather Squadron (45 WS), Space Launch Delta 45, at Patrick Space Force Base, Florida performs weather assessments for air and space operations; specifically, weather observations, forecasts, advisories, and warnings. It specialized in the weather assessments for the Space Shuttle launches at Kennedy Space Center (KSC) and Cape Canaveral Space Force Station.

The 45 WS provides comprehensive weather data and specialized services for the Eastern Range, such as for flight safety, resource protection (i.e. ground building and equipment), pre-launch ground processing, day-of-launch, post-launch, aviation, and special operations. These services are provided for more than 100 space launch countdowns per year for the Department of Defense (DOD), NASA, USAF, and commercial launch customers.

== Mission ==
The 45th Weather Squadron (Motto: "Exploit the Weather to Assure Access to Air and Space") at Patrick Space Force Base monitors weather around Cape Canaveral, Florida, the location of the United States's busiest spaceports. The squadron decides if launches are allowed using strict safety guidelines; there are ten lightning-related rules, any one of which may prohibit a launch. If a customer-driven weather rule is exceeded, the squadron may recommend a delay to the launch customer.

== History ==
Rocket launches can trigger lightning strikes during flight; Apollo 12 was hit by lightning twice during ascent. After an Atlas-Centaur rocket was hit by lightning in 1987 and destroyed by range safety, NASA and the Air Force formed an advisory panel with weather experts to develop guidelines for acceptable conditions. The 45th Weather Squadron uses the guidelines to permit rocket launches.

Detachment 11 of the 2nd Weather Squadron became the 45th Weather Squadron under the 45th Operations Group when the 45th Space Wing was activated in November 1991. Under either designation, the unit monitored the collection and analysis of all weather data pertinent to Patrick SFB, Cape Canaveral SFS, and Kennedy Space Center operations. The meteorologist provided briefings and forecasts, updated planning and program documents, and evaluated new weather instrumentation for possible use on the Eastern Range. In December 2005, 45 WS had 7 officers, 18 enlisted people and 9 civilians.

== Patch ==
The 45th Weather Squadron patch was designed in 1993 by Technical Sergeant Dave Rose and Senior Airman Tony Correa. The patch is composed of elements which depict the historical past of the 45th Weather Squadron. Two launch vehicles are shown rising above the Earth. One into a field of blue (representing day) and the other into a field of black (representing night). This symbolizes the 45th WS’s ongoing mission which operates 24/7/365.

The Earth is depicted as a blue disk bearing latitude and longitude lines. This is a reference to the days when Air Weather Service was a part of Military Airlift Command (MAC) and that same blue disk was featured on the MAC patch. The 4 stars in the blue field are a tribute to the 45th WS’s former affiliation with the 4th Weather Wing. The single star in the black field represents all the weather personnel who have died in the line of duty and are never forgotten.

The fleur de les and anemometer cups are a reference to when Air Weather Service was a part of the American Expeditionary Forces in France during World War I.

== Shuttle support ==
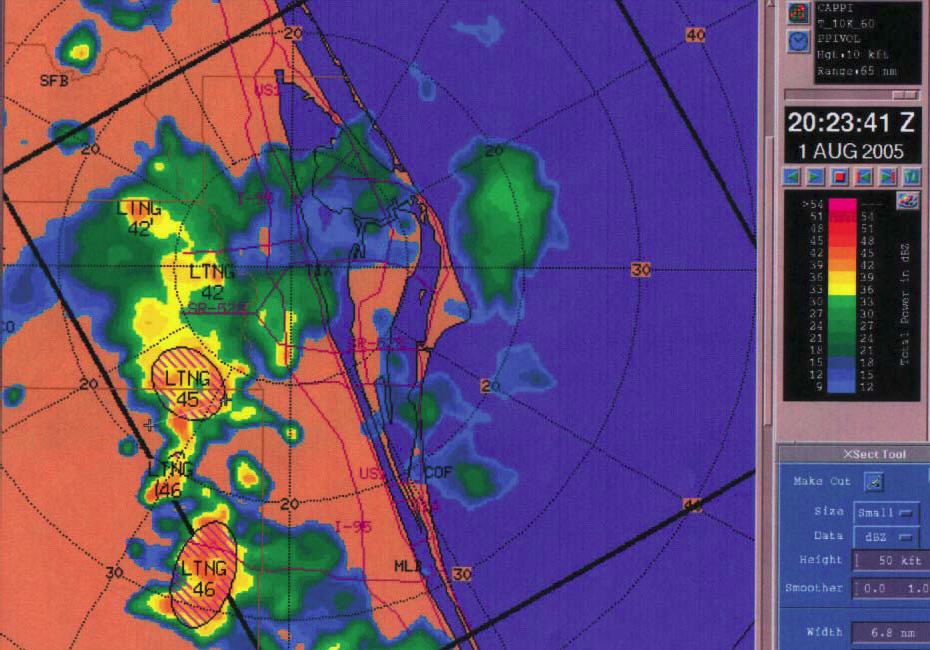
Weather above Kennedy Space Center

45 WS provided weather data to NASA's Lightning Launch Commit Criteria for Shuttle countdown procedures. For Shuttle landing criteria and site selection determination, the Shuttle’s in-flight weather support, including landing forecasts, was provided by the National Weather Service’s Spaceflight Meteorology Group (SMG) at Johnson Space Center (JSC), Texas, in joint with the 45th Weather Squadron. The 45th’s area of operation encompasses over 15,000,000 square miles (39,000,000 km^{2}) of air, land, and sea that make up NASA's and the USAF's east coast flight range. The 45 WS provided data and decision criteria when a Shuttle was ferried back to KSC from Edwards Air Force Base, California. This is where the Orbiter was mated on top of a modified Boeing 747, known as the Shuttle Carrier Aircraft, for the return flight to KSC. Edwards AFB desert landing runway was the primary backup site for returning Orbiters when the weather is severe at KSC.

== Lightning research ==
Lightning at Kennedy Space Center is a major hazard for space flight. 45WS hopes to implement plan with a specific guideline for determining how long a lightning warning should be maintained after a particular discharge is observed prior to any space launches. The plan will include a joint research project with Florida State University and will be using KSC's Lightning Detection and Ranging (LDAR) network. The LDAR data collection will permit the study of intracloud and cloud-to-ground discharges within isolated thunderstorms over the KSC.

Further reading: NASA

== Awards ==
- Outstanding Specialized Weather Unit - Moorman Award - 1999
- Outstanding Specialized Weather Support Unit - 2008

== See also ==
- List of United States Air Force weather squadrons
