= Spaceflight Meteorology Group =

U.S. weather forecasting unit

The Spaceflight Meteorology Group (SMG) is a U.S. weather forecasting unit staffed by the National Weather Service (NWS) for the National Aeronautics and Space Administration (NASA) which provides pertinent information on the current and expected state of the atmosphere during human spaceflight operations. It is located at the Johnson Space Center (JSC) in Houston, Texas. Meteorological information for the broader space program is provided by the 45th Space Wing's 45th Weather Squadron of the U.S. Air Force (USAF).

SMG covered Space Shuttle missions and was planned to cover Orion missions. Following the landing of Space Shuttle Atlantis during STS-135 on July 21, 2011, many of the SMG forecasters were relocated elsewhere in the National Weather Service, leaving a reduced staff at JSC. The Spaceflight Meteorology Group is also tasked with forecasting emergency landings for Soyuz missions when those rendezvous with the International Space Station (ISS).

== See also ==
- Space Weather Prediction Center (SWPC)
- Center Weather Service Unit (CWSU)
- 557th Weather Wing (USAF)
