= Boulder Geomagnetic Observatory =

Geomagnetic observation facility near Boulder, Colorado

Boulder Geomagnetic Observatory (BOU) is a geomagnetic observation facility operated by the United States Geological Survey (USGS). It is located near Boulder, Colorado at 40°08′15″N 105°14′16″W. The site was established in 1961.

Customers of the observatory include the Space Weather Prediction Center (SWPC) and the Air Force Weather Agency (AFWA).

== Instruments ==
- A magnetometer
- A solar proton sensor

== See also ==
- Space weather
- Heliophysics
- K-index
