= 1st Air Support Operations Group =

1st Air Support Operations Group

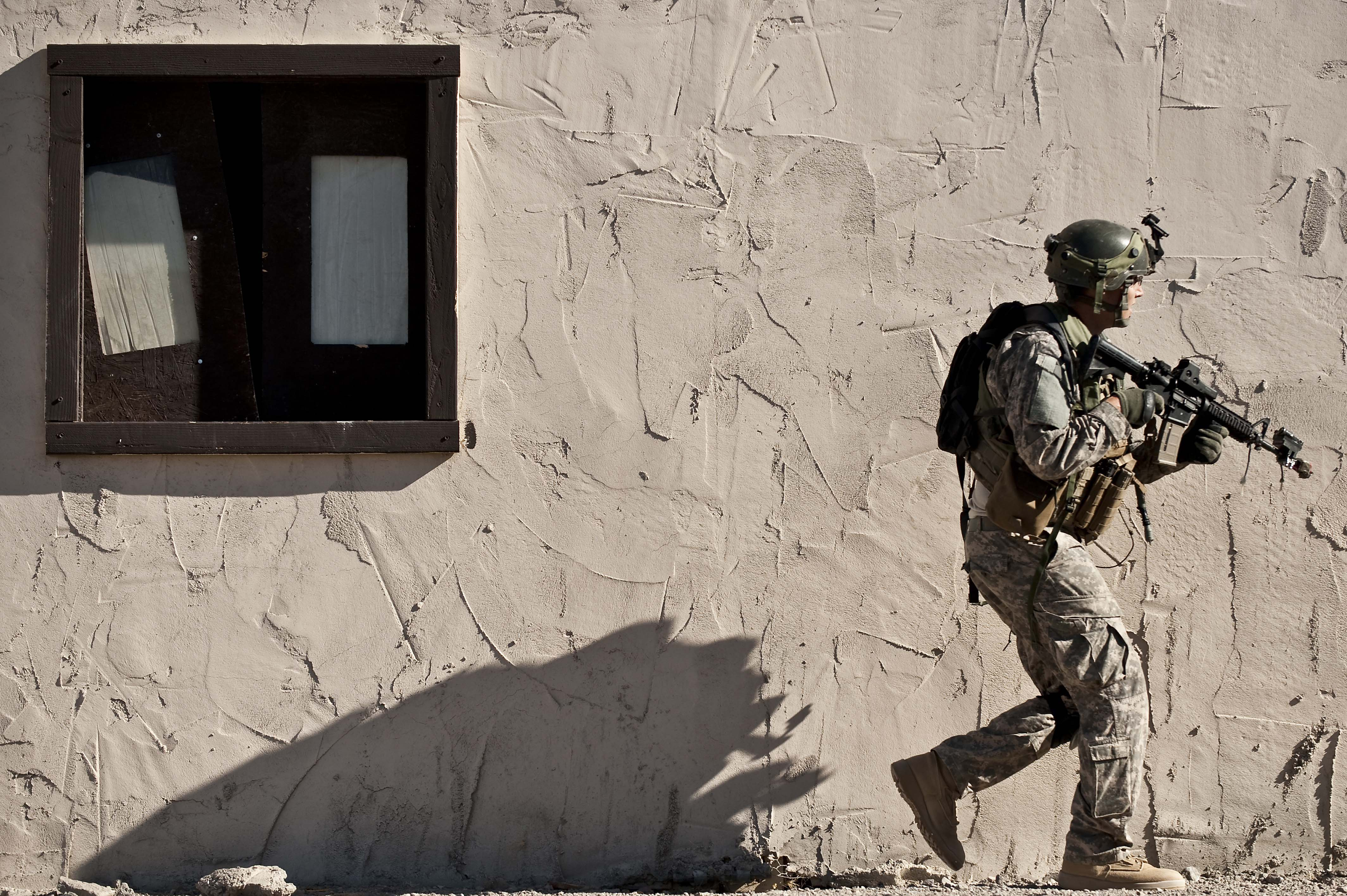
- A group joint tactical air controller provides security during a training exercise at Fort Irwin.
- Active: 1942–1945; 1992–present
- Country: United States
- Branch: United States Air Force
- Type: Group
- Role: Control of close air support
- Part of: Pacific Air Forces
- Garrison/HQ: Joint Base Lewis-McChord
- Motto: Ready First
- Engagements: CBI Theater

Insignia
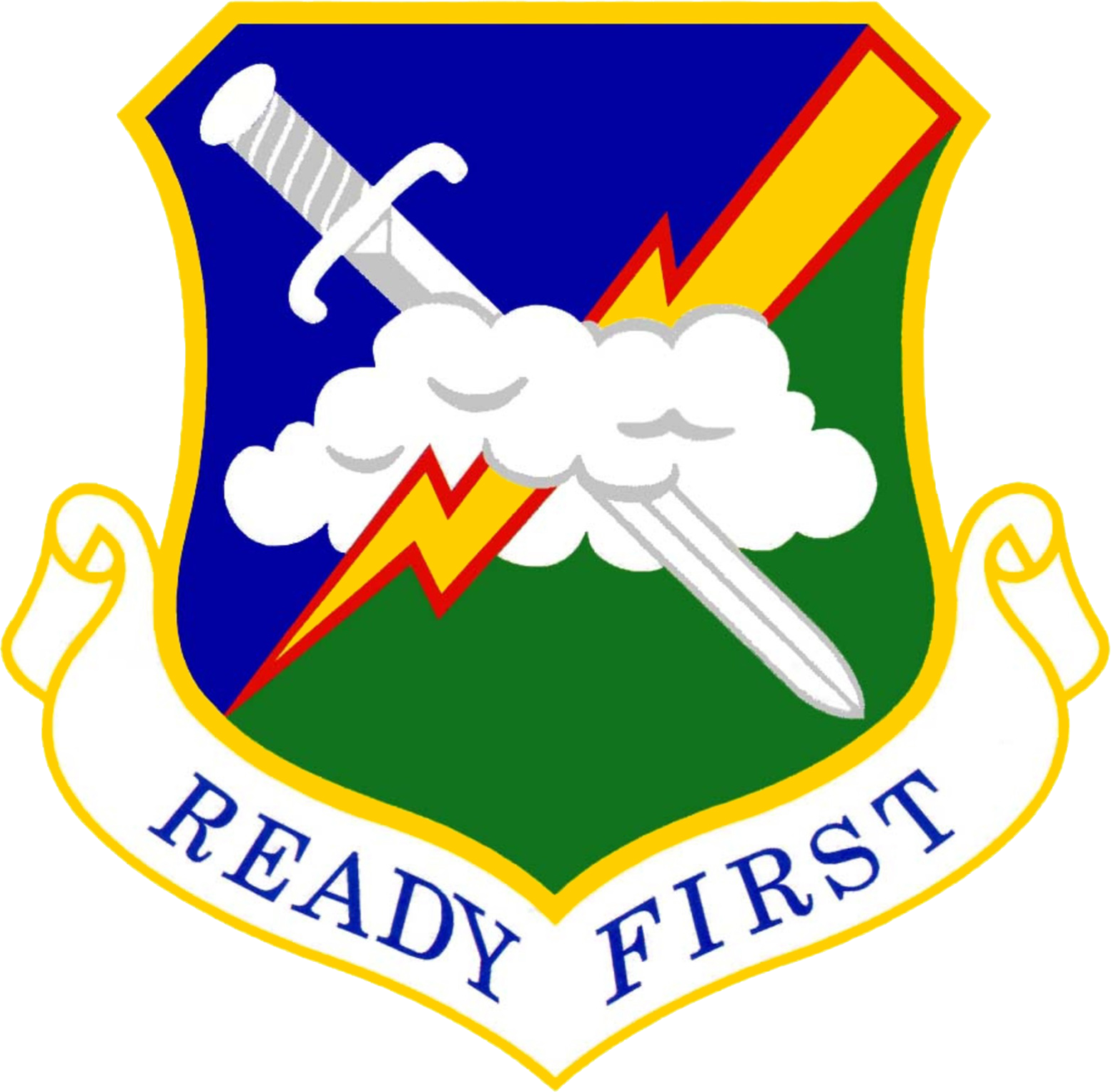
- 1st Air Support Operations Group emblem (Note: Approved 15 September 1997.)

The United States Air Force's 1st Air Support Operations Group is a combat support unit located at Joint Base Lewis-McChord, Washington. The group provides tactical command and control of airpower assets to the Joint Forces Air Component Commander and Joint Forces Land Component Commander for combat operations.

The group was reconstituted, redesignated, and activated in its current role in June 1992. After a minor name change (from Air Support Group to Air Support Operations Group) in July 1994, its current insignia was approved on 15 September 1997.

== Mission ==
The group directs four squadrons operating from 11 locations in Washington, Alaska, Hawaii and Japan. The group provides an Air Support Operations Center and Tactical Air Control Parties to US Army combat units at multiple echelons including United States Army Pacific, I Corps, and nine aviation, airborne, infantry and Stryker brigade combat teams of the 2nd and 25th Infantry Divisions. The 1st Weather Squadron provides operational and staff weather services for Army combat units across the Pacific Command area of responsibility. In addition, they train and maintain combat readiness for worldwide battlefield weather deployments. The groups Air Liaison Officers and Joint Terminal Attack Controllers advise Army commanders and staffs on all aspects of joint airpower employment, integrating and synchronizing close air support, air mobility, and intelligence surveillance and reconnaissance capabilities into strategy, plans, and operations.

Prior to the reformation of the Special Operations Weather career field into the new Special Reconnaissance field, the group operated a small contingent of special operations weather technician airmen.

The group is assigned to the 354th Fighter Wing at Eielson Air Force Base, Alaska. The group is stationed at Joint Base Lewis-McChord, Washington.

== Lineage ==
- Constituted as the 1st Communications Squadron, Air Support on 31 March 1942

Activated on 23 April 1942
Redesignated 1st Air Support Communication Squadron on 11 January 1943
Redesignated 1st Tactical Air Communications Squadron on 1 April 1944
Inactivated on 29 October 1945
Disbanded on 8 October 1948

- Reconstituted, redesignated 1st Air Support Group and activated on 15 June 1992

Redesignated 1st Air Support Operations Group on 1 July 1994

=== Assignments ===
- Sixth Air Force, 23 April 1942 (attached to 72d Observation Group)
- Third Air Force, 10 April 1943
- III Ground Air Support Command (later III Air Support Command, III Reconnaissance) Command), c. 19 May 1943 (attached to I Tactical Air Division after c. 8 September 1943)
- I Tactical Air Division, 3 November 1943
- Tenth Air Force, 31 March 1944
- Fourteenth Air Force, 19 April 1945 (attached to XIV Air Force Tactical Air Command [Provisional ] after 21 June 1945)
- Tenth Air Force, 1 August 1945
- Fourteenth Air Force, 3 September 1945 – unknown
- 355th Wing, 15 June 1992
- Twelfth Air Force, 1 February 1994
- Thirteenth Air Force, 1 October 2008
- 354th Fighter Wing, 28 September 2012 – present

=== Stations ===
- Albrook Field, Panama Canal Zone, 23 April 1942
- Birmingham Army Air Base, Alabama, April 1943
- Lebanon Army Air Field, Tennessee, 8 September 1943
- Morris Field, North Carolina, 28 November 1943 – 11 February 1944
- Bombay, India, 31 March 1944
- Dinjan, India, 23 April 1944
- Myitkyina, Burma, c. 23 October 1944
- Bhamo, Burma, 15 February 1945
- Lüliang, China, 24 April – September 1945
- Camp Kilmer, New Jersey, 28-29 October 1945
- Fort Lewis (later became part of Joint Base Lewis-McChord), Washington, 15 June 1992 – present

=== Components ===
- 1st Weather Squadron Fort Lewis, Washington
- 3d Air Support Operations Squadron, Joint Base Elmendorf-Richardson, Alaska
- 5th Air Support Operations Squadron McChord Air Force Base, Washington
- 25th Air Support Operations Squadron Wheeler Army Airfield, Hawaii
