= Center Weather Service Unit =

U.S. National Weather Service unit

A Center Weather Service Unit (CWSU) is a National Weather Service (NWS) unit located inside each of the Federal Aviation Administration's 22 Air Route Traffic Control Centers (ARTCC).

== Overview ==
CWSU meteorologists provide support for FAA's air traffic management with pertinent meteorological information for airports and airspace in the control center's area of responsibility.

Meteorologists disseminate information to brief air traffic control area managers where, when, and what is expected, when the weather arrives in the ARTCC's various sectors. Dissemination is by computer products, by incoming phone requests, and by stand up briefings. Occasionally CWSUs provide weather information and recommendations directly to air traffic controllers. They sometimes will provide information directly to the pilots of aircraft in distress due to hazardous weather conditions. In addition to SIGMETs (significant meteorological events), Convective SIGMETs (significant meteorological event associated with convection), and AIRMETs (significant meteorological events generally effecting smaller aircraft) issued by the Aviation Weather Center (AWC), CWSUs issue Center Weather Advisories (CWA) and Meteorological Impact Statements (MIS) as necessary.

CWSUs are staffed by around 4 NWS meteorologists (including one manager), but their operations are eventually reimbursed by the FAA's budget under an "Interagency Agreement". Due to budget pressures, the FAA was considering closing the CWSU program up to 2006.

== History ==
Center Weather Service Units (CWSUs) began operations on April 3, 1978 after the Southern Airways Flight 242 crash near Atlanta in 1977 where the NTSB recommended increased weather situational awareness for the Federal Aviation Administration (FAA)'s Air Traffic Controllers. After this incident, the Federal Aviation Administration (FAA) and National Weather Service (NWS) began a contractual Interagency Agreement (IAA) partnership that remains to this day.

One (1) Meteorologist-in-Charge (MIC) and three (3) General Forecasters that comprise the Center Weather Service Unit are co-located inside each of the FAA's 21 CONUS Air Route Traffic Control Centers (ARTCCs) and are structured under the Department of Commerce (DOC)'s National Oceanic and Atmospheric Administration (NOAA) National Weather Service (NWS).

== See also ==
- Spaceflight Meteorology Group (SMG)
