= 5th Air Support Operations Squadron =

5th Air Support Operations Squadron

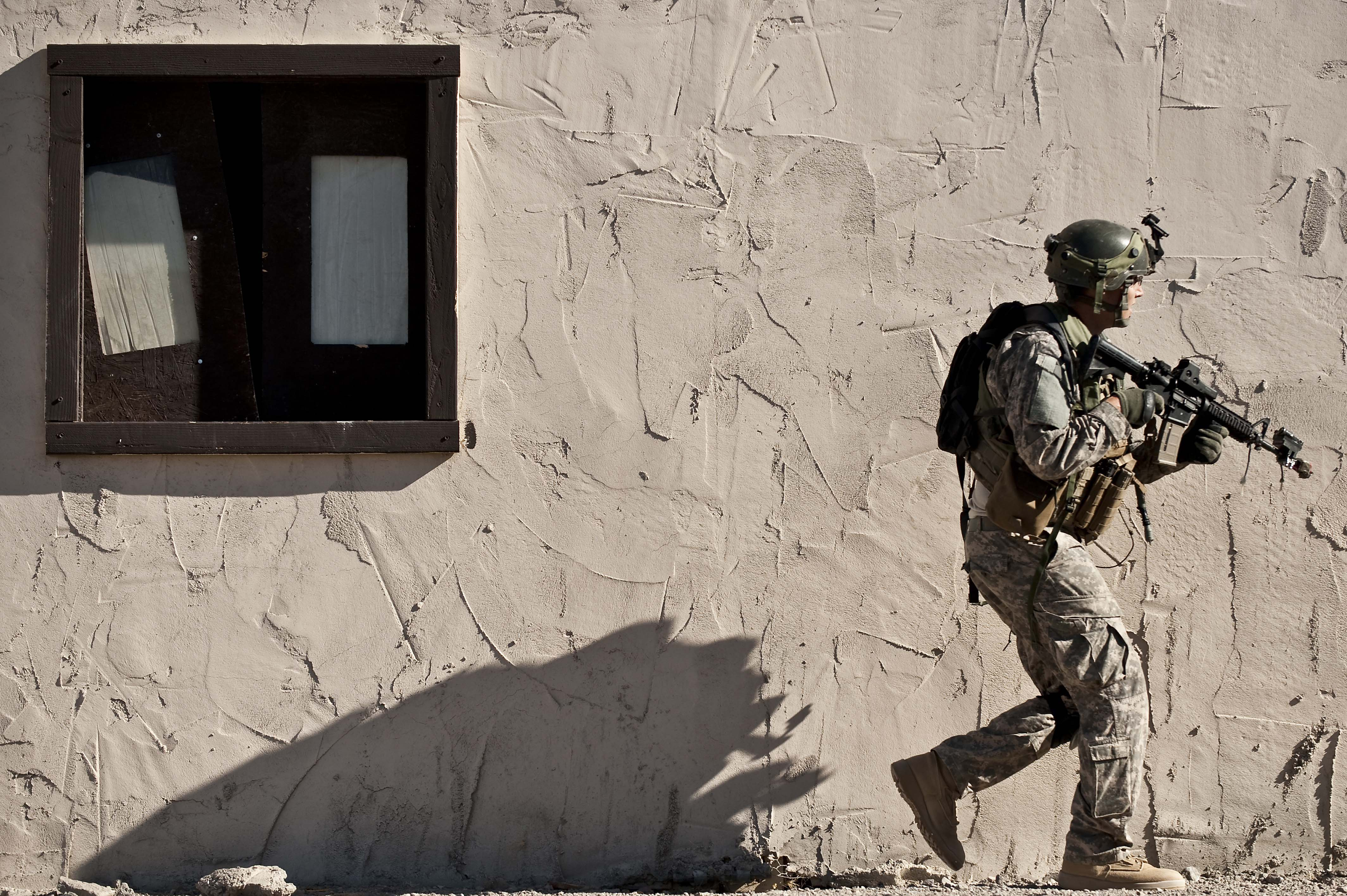
- A squadron joint tactical air controller provides security during a training exercise at Fort Irwin.
- Active: 1942–1945; 1994–present
- Country: United States
- Branch: United States Air Force
- Role: Air Support Operations
- Size: Squadron
- Part of: Pacific Air Forces
- Garrison/HQ: Fort Lewis
- Engagements: Southwest Pacific Theater; Iraq War
- Decorations: Air Force Outstanding Unit Award with Combat "V" Device; Air Force Outstanding Unit Award; Philippine Presidential Unit Citation

Insignia
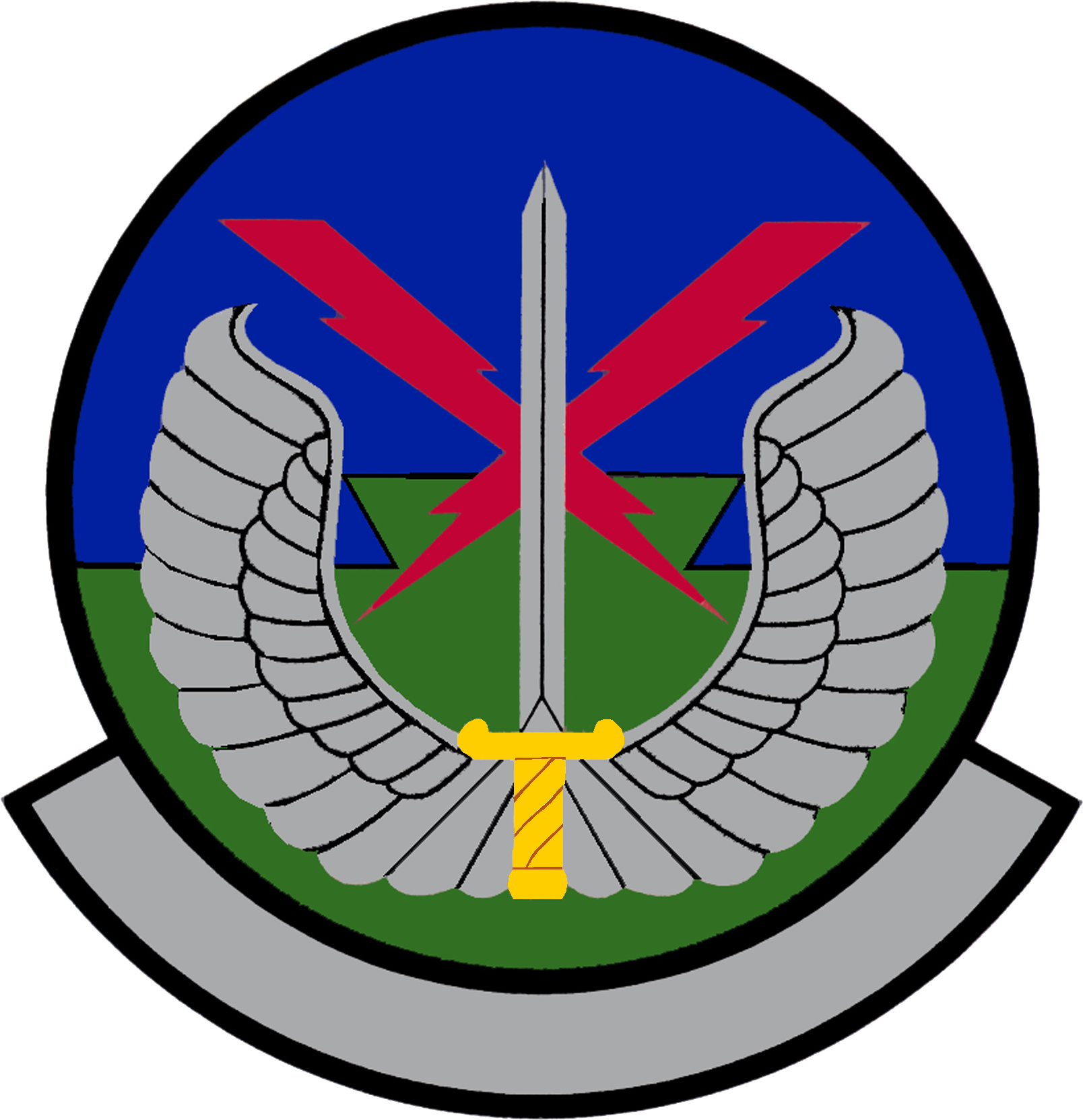
- 5th Air Support Operations Squadron emblem (approved 28 October 1996)

The United States Air Force's 5th Air Support Operations Squadron is a combat support squadron located at Fort Lewis, Washington. The unit provides tactical command and control of airpower assets to the Joint Forces Air Component Commander and Joint Forces Land Component Commander for combat operations.

== History ==
=== World War II ===
The squadron was first activated in May 1942 as the 5th Communications Squadron. After training in the United States, it moved to Australia in May 1943, where it became an element of Fifth Air Force as the 5th Air Support Communication Squadron. It participated in combat, earning arrowhead devices for participation in amphibious landings in New Guinea, the Bismark Archipelago, and Leyte. Its air support parties served with United States Marines and United States and Australian Army forces, directing air support missions for the forces they served. After V-J Day, the squadron was inactivated in the Philippines in November 1945.

=== Reactivation ===
The squadron was reactivated at Fort Lewis, Washington in July 1994 as the 5th Air Support Operations Squadron. It has deployed personnel to fight since the September 11 terrorist attacks in 2001, notably during the Iraq War (2003-2010). The unit's Joint Terminal Attack Controllers are traditionally aligned with I Corps and the Joint Base Lewis-McChord based Stryker Brigades, but due to manning shortages and theater requirements, the unit's airmen have deployed with many different units during the past decade.

== Lineage ==
- Constituted as the 5th Communications Squadron, Air Support on 15 May 1942

Activated on 22 May 1942
Redesignated 5th Air Support Communication Squadron on 11 January 1943
Redesignated 5th Air Support Control Squadron on 20 August 1943
Redesignated 5th Tactical Air Communications Squadron on 1 April 1944
Inactivated on 28 November 1945
Disbanded on 8 October 1948

- Reconstituted and redesignated 5th Air Support Operations Squadron on 24 June 1994

Activated on 1 July 1994

=== Assignments ===
- I Ground Air Support Command (later I Air Support Command), 15 May 1942
- Fifth Air Force, June 1943
- 308th Bombardment Wing, 25 July 1945
- XIII Bomber Command, 20 October–28 November 1945
- 1st Air Support Operations Group, 1 July 1994 – present

=== Stations ===
- Mitchel Field, New York, 22 May 1942
- Lebanon, Tennessee, 9 September 1942
- Morris Field, North Carolina, c. 21 October 1942 – 8 May 1943
- Brisbane, New South Wales, Australia, 13 June 1943
- Cairns, Queensland, Australia, 26 July 1943
- Port Moresby, New Guinea, 11 September 1943
- Finschhafen, New Guinea, 29 February 1944
- Hollandia, New Guinea, Netherlands East Indies, 30 August 1944
- Morotai, Netherlands East Indies, 1 October 1944
- Clark Field, Luzon, Philippines, 14 May–28 November 1945
- Fort Lewis (later part of Joint Base Lewis-McChord), Washington, 1 July 1994 – present
