= Flight Control Command =

1943 United States Army Air Forces command

Flight Control Command was a command of the United States Army Air Forces, active from 29 March 1943 – 1 October 1943.

It supervised the Continental United States weather and communications services previously provided by the USAAF Directorate of Technical Services, which was discontinued when the Army Air Forces' "system of directorates"* was abandoned "to move all operations into the field" under Assistant Chiefs of Staff.

On 26 April 1943, following the decision to abandon the system of directorates at headquarters Army Air Forces and to move all operations into the field, the Army Airways Communications System (AACS) was activated as part of the newly created Flight Control Command.

The reorganization placed the command as 1 of 3 support commands and 11 numbered air forces under the "Operations, Commitments and Requirements" Assistant Chief (AC/AS OC&R).

1st Weather Squadron and 2nd Weather Squadron both were part of the Command.

The Office of Flying Safety was established 1 October 1943 at the Winston-Salem facilities of the old Directorate of Flying Safety and replaced the Flight Control Command. Colonel S.R. Harris had been the Director of Flying Safety from 10 March 1942 until 29 March 1943.

== Components ==
Included:

- Army Airways Communications Systems Wing assigned on 26 April 1943
- Weather Wing, Flight Control Command beginning 14 April 1943 (transferred to HQ AAF as the "Army Air Forces Weather Wing" on 6 July 1943)

The AACS was reassigned to Air Transport Command as the Air Communications Service on 13 March 1946.
