= 1st Combat Weather Squadron =

- Active: 1937–1944, 1949–1952, 1966–1992, 1992–1994, 1994–present
- Country: United States
- Branch: United States Air Force
- Size: Squadron
- Garrison/HQ: Fort Lewis, Washington

Insignia
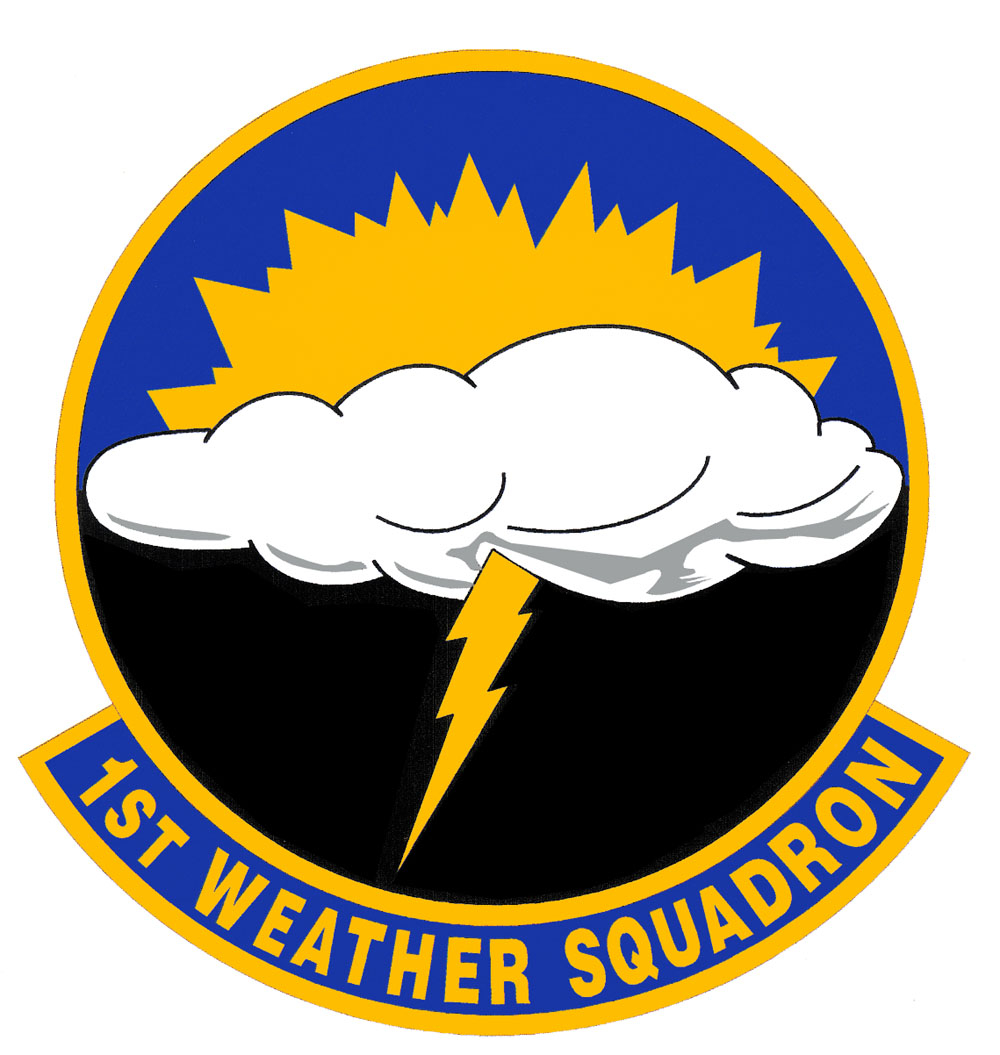
- 1st Weather Squadron emblem

The United States Air Force's 1st Combat Weather Squadron (1 CWS) is a weather unit located at Fort Lewis, Washington. The squadron is part of the 1st Air Support Operations Group, and it provides support to units based at Joint Base Lewis–McChord, including I Corps, the Stryker brigades, an army aviation unit, the 16th Combat Aviation Brigade, and the 201st Expeditionary Military Intelligence Brigade.

== Duties ==
The 1st Weather Squadron assists soldiers on the battlefield by predicting the weather, allowing the commanders to determine when to undertake "full-spectrum operations." According to Lorin Smith, the unit's personnel are able to report on the weather that will occur during a "unit's future missions and create battlefield reports to the unit commander on whether that mission will be impacted by the weather and local environment." Weather effects that can be predicted include dust storms and floods. The airmen are taught "infantry tactics" and they are trained in the same basic abilities as soldiers. The 1st Weather Squadron has two sides which are designated as "green and blue". The green side distributes "battlefield weather forecasts and briefing to Army leaders" while the blue side flies with jets and helicopters.

In 2019, it was reported that the squadron had 89 members "in six different U.S. Indo-Pacific Command locations". Their data helps 80,000 soldiers and assets belonging to the U.S. Army. The squadron also assists with natural disasters including volcanic eruptions and wildfires.

== History ==
Harold Huntley Bassett was the first commander of the squadron due to Oscar C. Maier not accepting the job after being recommended for the position.

=== Lineage ===
The lineage of the 1st Weather Squadron is as follows:

- Constituted as the 1st Weather Squadron on 24 June 1937

Activated on 1 July 1937
Redesignated 1st Weather Squadron, Regional on 16 June 1942
Redesignated 1st Weather Squadron, Original on 1 November 1943
Disbanded on 7 September 1944

- Reconstituted c. 21 April 1949

Activated on 20 May 1949
Inactivated on 20 May 1952
Organized on 8 January 1966
Inactivated on 15 June 1992
Activated on 15 June 1992
Inactivated on 29 April 1994
Activated on 1 July 1994
Redesignated 1st Combat Weather Squadron on 1 Jun 2021.

=== Assignments ===
The assignments of the 1st Weather Squadron are as follows:

- Office of the Chief of Air Corps: 1 July 1937
- Army Air Forces: March 1942
- Flight Control Command: 14 April 1943
- Weather Wing, Flight Control Command: May 1943 – 7 September 1944
- 2102d Air Weather Group: 20 May 1949
- 2059th Air Weather Wing: 1950
- 5th Weather Wing: 8 January 1966
- Air Combat Command: inactivated on 15 June 1992
- 1st Operations Group, inactivated on 29 April 1994
- 1st Air Support Operations Group, 1 July 1994 – present

=== Stations ===
- March Field, California, 1 July 1937
- McClellan Field, California, 3 February 1941
- Santa Monica, California, November 1943 – 7 September 1944
- Wright-Patterson Air Force Base, Ohio, 20 May 1949 – 19 May 1952
- MacDill Air Force Base, 8 January 1966 – 15 June 1992
- Langley Air Force Base, Virginia, 15 June 1992 – 29 April 1994
- Fort Lewis (later became part of Joint Base Lewis-McChord, 1 July 1994 – present

=== Decorations ===
- 2016 Weather Squadron of the Year
