= Cyberspace Capabilities Center =

US Air Force organization

- Center emblem
- Active: 26 April 1943 – present
- Country: United States
- Branch: United States Air Force
- Type: Center
- Role: Information technology support
- Part of: Air Combat Command
- Location: Scott Air Force Base, Illinois

Commanders
- Current commander: Colonel Christopher T. Rubiano

The Cyberspace Capabilities Center (CCC), located at Scott Air Force Base, Illinois, is the primary organization that develops cyber domain requirements in the United States Air Force.

The center's goals are to attain a unity of effort of functions and tasks across cyber organizations, to improve scalability of resources, to prioritize demand via multiple requirements processes, and delineate enterprise information technology roles from cyber operation missions' services.

“Simply put, the CCC will provide future opportunities to enhance how the Air Force provides Enterprise Information Technology capabilities and will better support and develop Airmen working in this mission set,”

said Brig. Gen. Chad Raduege, Director of Cyberspace and Information Dominance, during the designation ceremony in 2019.

The Center traces its history to the establishment of the Army Airways Communications System Wing in 1943.

== History ==
On 15 November 1938 the Army Airways Communications System was established within the Directorate of Communications of the Office of the Chief of the Air Corps, as a staff branch. The organization first became a unit, as opposed to a staff branch, with the creation of the Army Airways Communications System Wing and its assignment to the Flight Control Command when it was activated with the effective date of 26 April 1943.

The organization became the:

- Air Communications Service (13 March 1946)
- Airways and Air Communications Service (11 September 1946)
- Air Force Communications Service (AFCS) (1 July 1961)
- Air Force Communications Command (15 November 1979)

In October 1990 much of AFCC's personnel, organizations, and responsibilities were transferred to the Air Force major commands in the field. Each host base gained command responsibility for the local communications unit formerly commanded by AFCC. Total personnel assigned to AFCC fell to slightly under 8,000. AFCC retained the responsibility for engineering, installing, removing, and relocating Air Force communications, computer, and air traffic control systems. AFCC kept the Computer Systems Division at Gunter Air Force Base, AL., and the Engineering Installation Division at Tinker Air Force Base, OK. It also organized a new Technology Integration Center at Scott Air Force Base, co-located with AFCC headquarters.

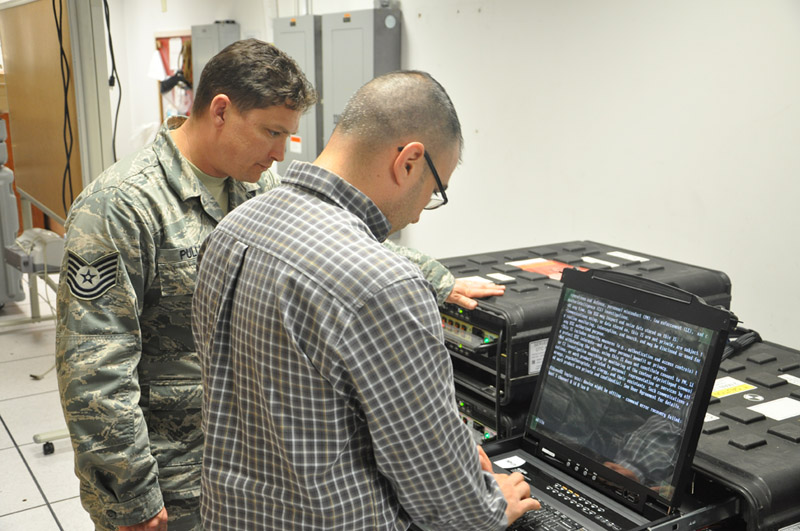
AFNIC Personnel working with the Simulator Training Exercise (SIMTEX) range

On 28 May 1993 Air Force Communications Command became the Air Force Command, Control, Communications, and Computer Agency. Just over three years later, on 13 June 1996, a further change occurred, to the Air Force Communications Agency (AFCA). The AFCA's status changed from a field operating agency of USAF to a subordinate unit of the Air Force Communications and Information Center on 1 April 1997. Its status changed again, from a subordinate unit of the Air Force Communications and Information Center to a USAF Field Operating Agency on 1 October 2000. It was subordinated to Air Force Space Command on 4 May 2009.

In 2012 it was announced that AFNIC would be restructured, transferring some of its cyber mission to Air Force Space Command. Current organize, train and equip staff functions within AFNIC, such as records, forms, publications, cyber training programs, cyber requirements support, plans, and maintenance policy, transferred to the AFSPC Cyberspace Support Squadron (CYSS), which stood up at Scott AFB.

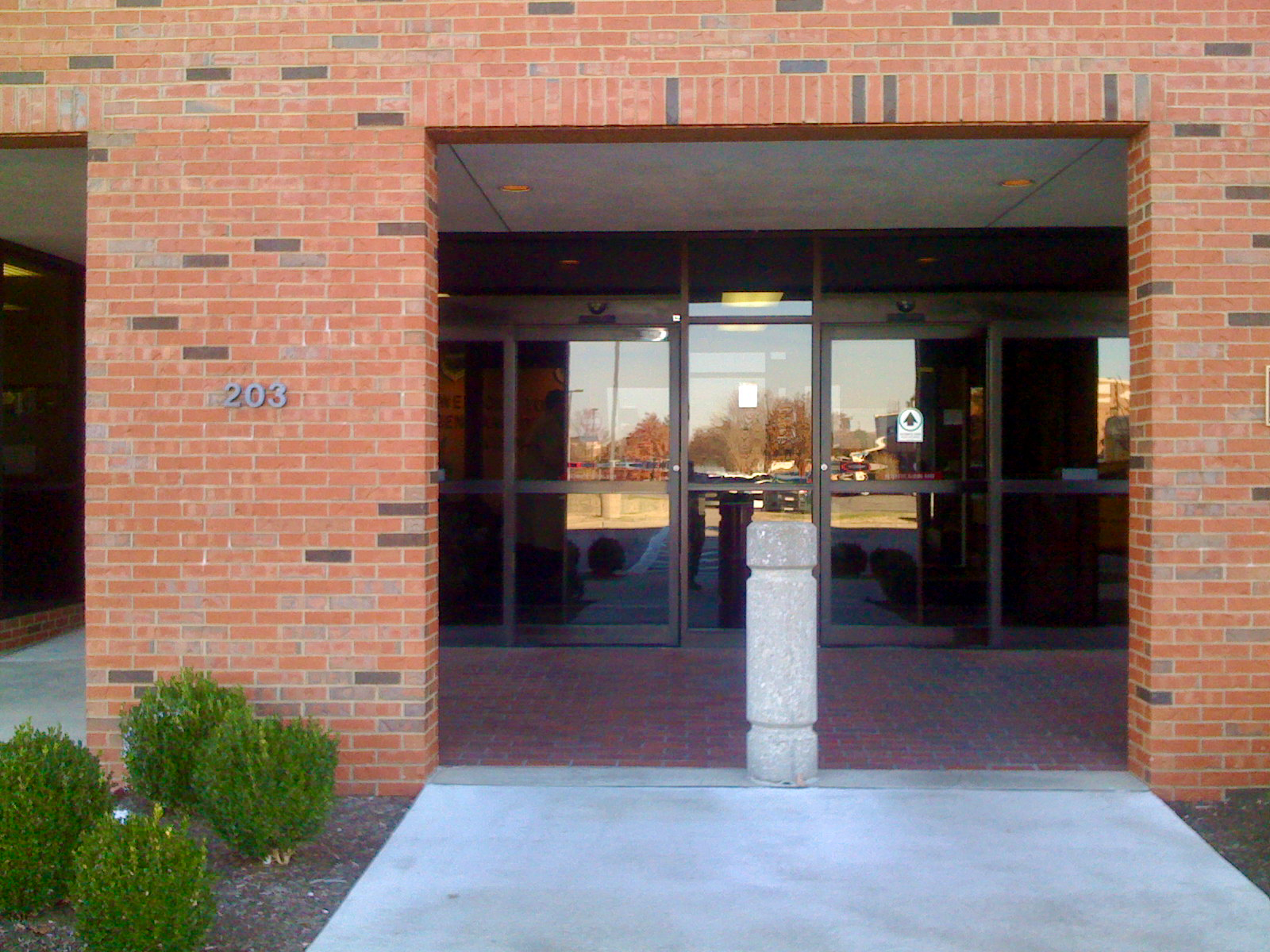
In November 2008, HQ AFCA was at Scott Air Force Base

In November 2019, AFNIC was designated the Cyberspace Capabilities Center under Air Combat Command. The center, or CCC, absorbed the Air Force Network Integration Center, Air Combat Command's Cyberspace Support Squadron and the 38th Cyberspace Readiness Squadron, which were all located at Scott Air Force Base and inactivated during a ceremony.

The CCC falls under Air Combat Command, which accepted cyber responsibilities in the summer of 2018. ACC has been making strides to foster innovation and integrate cyber functions to better support combatant commander requests for forces. The secretary of the Air Force and Air Force chief of staff directed the realignment to ACC to help the service support the National Defense Strategy’s goal of preparing for a future high-end fight.

== Designations and Dates ==
- 15 November 1938 – Army Airways Communications System [constituted as a non-unit]
- 13 April 1943 – Army Airways Communications System Wing (constituted; activated effective 26 April 1943)
- 26 April 1944 – Army Airways Communications System
- 13 March 1946 – Air Communications Service
- 11 September 1946 – Airways and Air Communications Service
- 1 July 1961 – Air Force Communications Service
- 15 November 1979 – Air Force Communications Command
- 28 May 1993 – Air Force Command, Control, Communications, and Computer Agency
- 13 June 1996 – Air Force Communications Agency (AFCA). Status changed from a field operating agency of USAF to a subordinate unit of the Air Force Communications and Information Center on 1 April 1997. Status changed from a subordinate unit of the Air Force Communications and Information Center to a field operating agency of the USAF on 1 October 2000. Status changed from a Field Operating Agency of the USAF to a subordinate unit of Air Force Space Command on 4 May 2009.
- 15 July 2009 – Air Force Network Integration Center (AFNIC)
- 7 November 2019 – Cyberspace Capabilities Center

== Assignments ==
- Flight Control Command, 26 Apr 1943;
- Army Air Forces, 13 Jul 1943;
- Air Transport Command, 13 Mar 1946-1 Jun 1948.
- Military Air Transport Service, 16 Aug 1948;
- United States Air Force, 1 Jul 1961;
- Air Force Communications and Information Center, 1 Apr 1997;
- United States Air Force, 1 Oct 2000;
- Air Force Space Command, 5 May 2009;
- Air Combat Command, 17 Jul 2018-.

== Stations ==
- 27 March 1943 Bolling Field, Washington, D.C.
- 3 May 1943 Municipal Building, Asheville, North Carolina
- 17 December 1945 Langley Field, Virginia
- 12 December 1946 Gravelly Point, Virginia (Adjacent to Washington National Airport)
- 19 November 1948 Andrews Air Force Base, Maryland
- 15 January 1958 Scott Air Force Base, Illinois
- 16 July 1970 Richards-Gebaur Air Force Base, Missouri
- 1 November 1977 Scott Air Force Base, Illinois

== Awards ==
Air Force Organizational Excellence Award: 1 July 1984 - 30 June 1986, 1 July 1986 - 30 June 1988, 1 July 1988 - 30 June 1990, 1 July 1990 - 30 June 1992, 1 July 1992 - 30 June 1994, 1 July 1994 - 30 June 1996, 1 April 1997 - 30 Sept 1998, 1 Oct 1998 - 30 Sept 2000, 20 Apr 2002 - 30 Sept 2003

== See also ==
- List of United States Air Force Field Operating Agencies
