= 2d Systems Operations Squadron =

2d Systems Operations Squadron

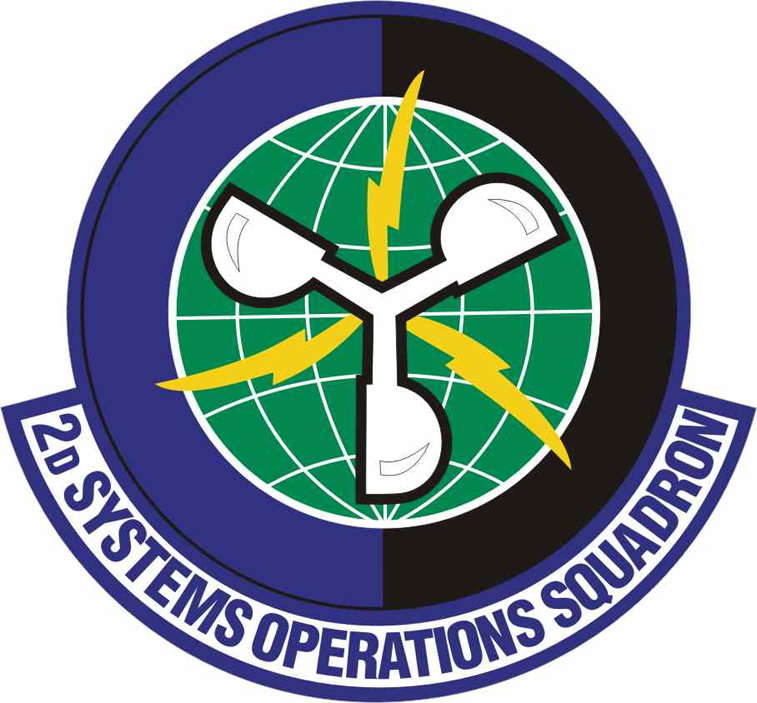
- 2nd Systems Operations Squadron emblem (approved 8 May 2007 (Note: Symbolism: Blue and yellow are the Air Force colors. Blue alludes to the sky, the primary theater for Air Force operations. Yellow refers to the sun and the excellence required of Air Force personnel. Black represents strength and determination, Black and blue alludes the squadrons day and night operations. Green signifies adaptability, and is a color traditionally connected with the Army, a military service deriving direct benefit from the unit’s products and services. The flashes are three in number, symbolic of the three Air Force Weather enabling concepts of environmental characterization, managing net-centric data and services and information exploitation. Each flash has three points, signifying support to strategic-, operations, and tactical operations. The anemometer symbolizes the squadron’s mission as an element of Air Force Weather. The three flashes and the anemometer share a common point and denote the fusing-the transformation- raw data into actionable environmental information. The globe represents the worldwide impact of the unit’s mission.)
- Active: 2007-present
- Country: United States
- Branch: United States Air Force
- Type: Squadron
- Role: Weather Systems Operations
- Part of: Air Combat Command
- Garrison/HQ: Offutt Air Force Base
- Decorations: Air Force Outstanding Unit Award

The 2d Systems Operations Squadron, stationed at Offutt Air Force Base, Nebraska, delivers global environmental intelligence products and services for the defense of the United States of America and its global interests through the 24 × 7 operation, sustainment and maintenance of Air Force Weather's strategic center computer complex, production network, and applications.

== Mission ==
The 2nd Systems Operations Squadron (2nd SYOS) delivers global environmental intelligence products and services for the defense of the United States of America and its global interests and operates and sustains the United States Air Force's $303M strategic weather high performance computing center to deliver authoritative environmental intelligence to decision makers across the spectrum of global operations.

The squadron operates the United States Air Force's largest Special Purpose Processing Node, the linchpin force enabler for the Air Force weather enterprise, generating thousands of critical environmental products and services to weather forecasters and operational end users every day, on a global scale. They maintain the Department of Defense's tactical weather location identifier program which ensures transmission of and access to vital weather information at deployed and oftentimes austere operating locations across the globe. Professionals operate the 2nd Weather Group's Change Management program that oversees 205 software projects annually and maintains 126 software baselines to deliver cutting-edge capabilities across the spectrum of military operations. They apply over 20,000 system patches annually to mitigate security vulnerabilities across 78 production platforms, ensure data integrity across 90 databases, and enable DoD's sole space weather warning capability to secure USA's $104B strategic satellite fleet.

== Organization ==
The 2nd SYOS is a 128-member squadron of military and civilian professionals, assigned to the 2nd Weather Group at Offutt Air Force Base, NE, that provides strategic-to operational-level specialized airpower by uniquely supporting the communication, computing, and programming needs of the highly-technical, data intensive Air Force Weather global enterprise. The squadron is composed of three flights: Operations, Software Sustainment and Change Management. Collectively, they form the core of the weather enterprise engine.

== History ==
The 2nd SYOS was activated on 28 March 2007 as part of an Air Force Weather Agency restructure.

On 27 March 2015 the Air Force Weather Agency was re-designated as the 557th Weather Wing and was aligned under the United States Air Force's Air Combat Command, Twelfth Air Force. The purpose of the change is to ultimately refocus attention strictly to the weather forecasting mission and heritage that the agency prides itself in.

== Lineage ==
- Constituted as the 2d Systems Operations Squadron on 17 January 2007
- Activated on 28 March 2007

=== Assignments ===
- Air Force Weather Agency, 28 March 2007 to 26 March 2015
- 557th Weather Wing, 27 March 2015 to Present
- 2d Weather Group, 28 March 2007 – present

=== Stations ===
- Offutt Air Force Base, Nebraska, 28 March 2007 – present

=== Commanders ===
- Lt Col C. Cantrell (28 Mar 2007 – 3 Aug 2009)
- Lt Col J. Shull (3 Aug 2009 – 22 Jul 2011)
- Lt Col M. Gauthier (22 Jul 2011 – 23 Jun 2014)
- Lt Col J. Blackerby (23 Jun 2014 – 26 Jun 2016)
- Lt Col J. McMillen (26 Jun 2016 – 30 Jun 2018)
- Lt Col R. DeLeon (30 Jun 2018 – 30 Jun 2020)
- Lt Col H. Schiano (30 Jun 2020 - 14 July 2022)
- Lt Col N. Gomez (14 July 2022 - 19 July 2024)
- Lt Col D. Bresser (19 July 2024 - 14 November 2025 (Deactivation))

=== Awards ===
- Air Force Outstanding Unit Award, 19 September 2007 – 31 December 2008
- 2007 Lt Gen Harold W. Grant Award nominee from AFWA (Note: The Lt Gen Harold W. Grant Award recognizes a communications and information organization each year for excellent support to the Air Force mission.)
- 2008 Lt Gen Harold W. Grant Award nominee from AFWA
- 2012 Lt Gen Harold W. Grant Award nominee from AFWA
