= Field mill =

Electric field measuring instrument

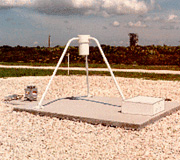
Field mill installation at the Kennedy Space Center in Florida

signal conditioning inside a field mill. ➀ Chopper wheel; ➁ sensor plates; ➂ base plate; ➃ rotary encoder; ➄ drive; ➅ amplifier; ➆ multiplier; ➇ low-pass; ➈ display

Principle in plain view

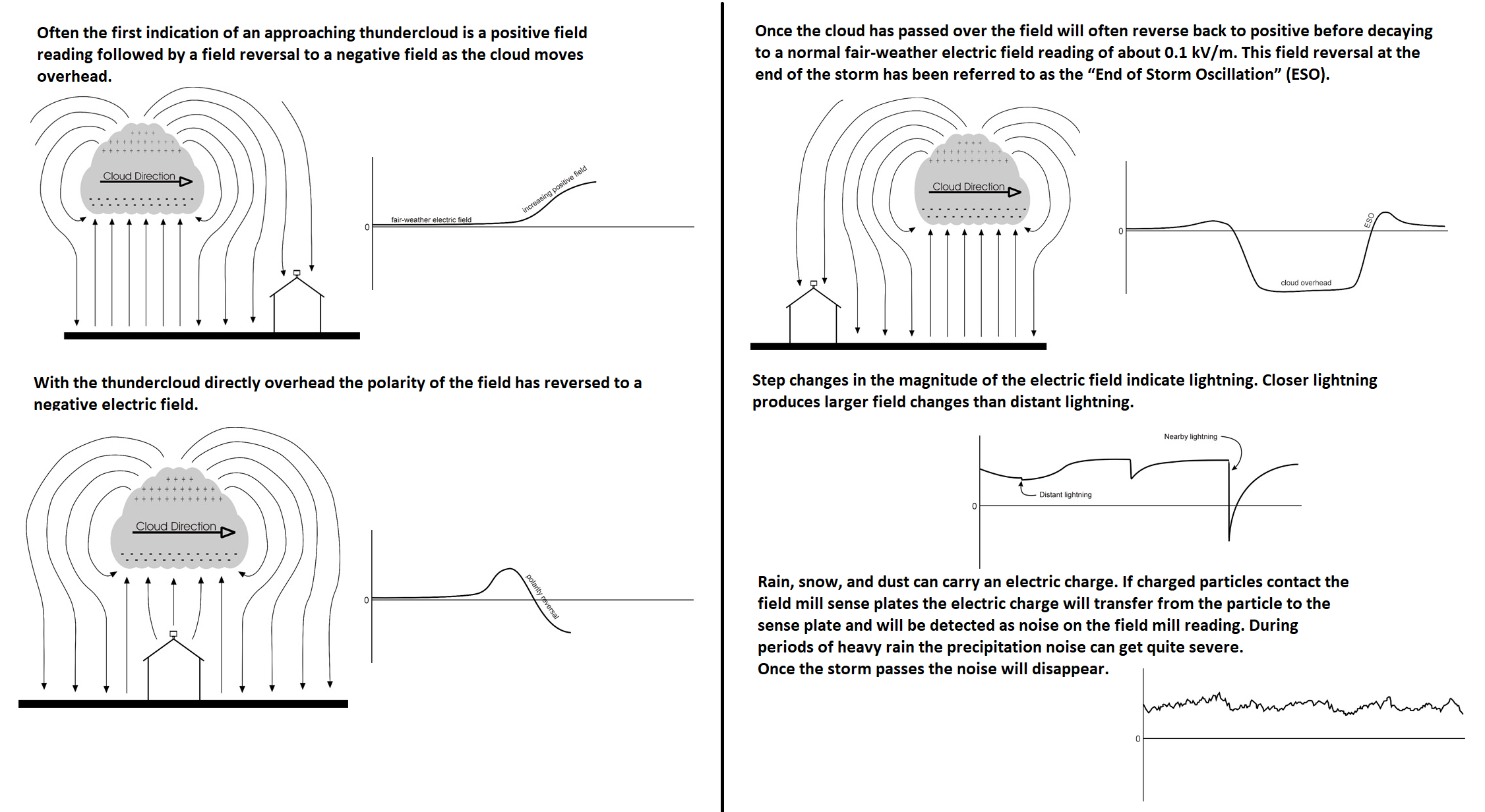
Electric Field mill operation

A field mill is a specialized instrument used for measuring the strength of electric fields in the atmosphere, one of the key parameters of atmospheric electricity. They are used in the launch criteria for rockets bound for orbit, as well as the now-retired Space Shuttle, to avoid lightning strikes. They are also used in outdoor laboratories for lightning protection equipment to determine favorable experiment conditions, or simply to measure the atmospheric electric field away from thunderstorms.

The "mill" is a typical rotating shutter design in the instrument. It acts as a chopper, converting the tiny DC signal of ambient static electricity into a tiny AC signal that is easier to detect without the amplifier's DC bias swamping it. It can be used on the ground, or deployed airborne and flown through anvil head clouds to make measurements.

== KSC electric field mill network ==
At Kennedy Space Center (KSC) in Florida, 31 field mills are deployed around KSC and the nearby Cape Canaveral Space Force Station. Data from the field mills help forecasters determine when electric charge aloft might trigger lightning during a launch.
