= 2nd Weather Squadron =

2nd Weather Squadron

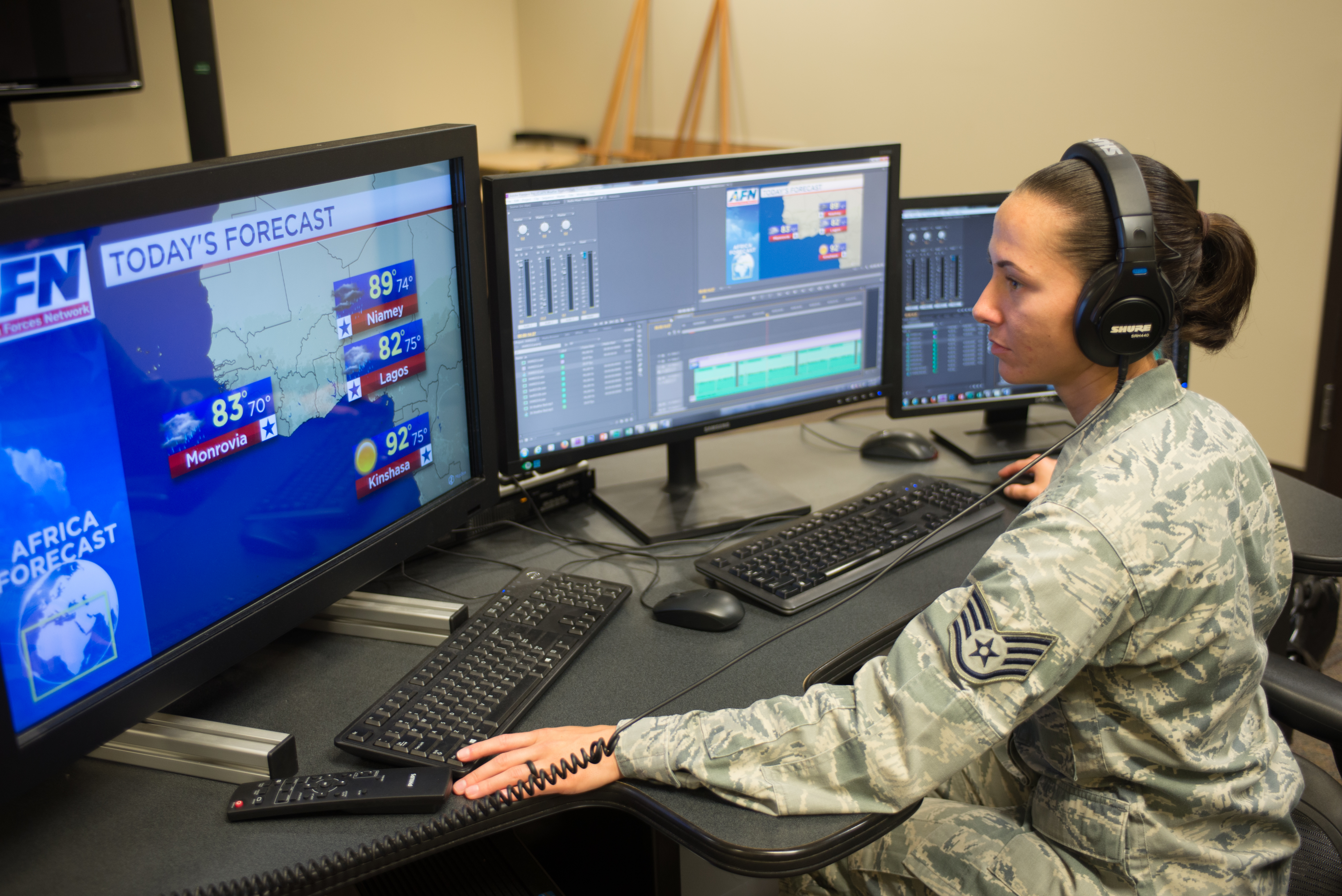
- A squadron member prepares a weather forecast animation in the American Forces Network Weather Center at Offutt AFB, Nebraska in 2018
- Country: United States
- Branch: United States Air Force
- Size: 151 personnel
- Part of: Air Combat Command: Sixteenth Air Force; 557th Weather Wing; 2nd Weather Group
- Garrison/HQ: Offutt Air Force Base, Nebraska

Insignia
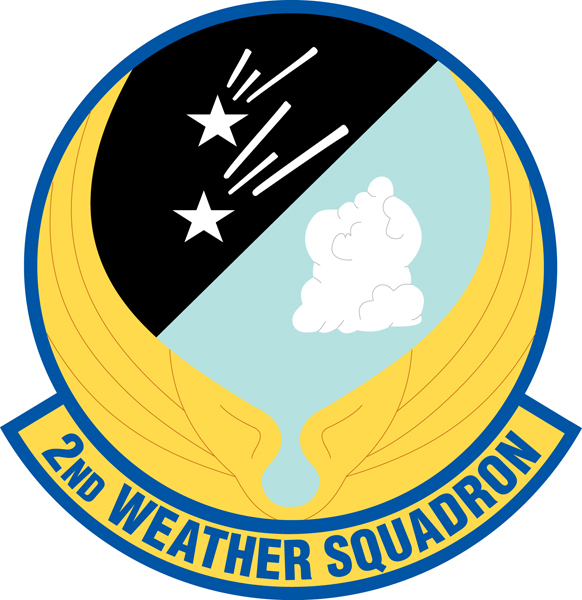
- 2nd Weather Squadron emblem

The 2nd Weather Squadron (2 WS) is an active United States Air Force unit assigned to the 2nd Weather Group of the 557th Weather Wing and is headquartered at Offutt Air Force Base, Nebraska. The squadron's mission is broad and includes the preparation of weather analysis for the intelligence community, observation of space weather (being the Department of Defense's sole provider of this type of information), monitoring of volcanic ash, cloud analysis, production of weather broadcasts for the American Forces Network, as well as other tasks. The squadron's personnel is located at seven different sites worldwide.

The 2nd WS operates five solar observatories around the globe: Det. 1, Learmonth, Australia; Det. 2, Sagamore Hill, Mass.; Det. 4, Holloman AFB, N.M.; Det. 5, Kaena Point, Hawaii; and San Vito, Italy.

== Emblem ==
The black of the shield symbolizes night, with the two stars indicative of the 2nd Weather Squadron. The blue of the shield represents day with a typical cloud formation symbolizing weather, the inference being the 2nd WS is on duty night and day, observing and forecasting the weather elements. The wings represent the Air Force to which the weather service is assigned.

== History ==
The Second Weather Squadron was constituted on 24 June 1937 and assigned to the Office of the Chief of the Air Corps on 1 July 1937 at Langley Field, Va. It was one of three original squadrons organized when the weather function transferred from the Signal Corps to the Air Corps. The squadron moved to Patterson Field, Ohio, in March 1941, and was assigned to the Directorate of Weather, Army Air Forces in March 1942. It was redesignated as the 2nd Weather Squadron, Regional, in June 1942 and assigned to the Flight Control Command in April 1943 and to the Weather Wing, Flight Control Command (later Army Air Forces Weather Wing) in May 1943. The squadron was once again redesignated as the 2d Weather Squadron in November 1943 and disbanded on 7 September 1944 at Patterson Field, Ohio, and replaced by the 69th Army Air Forces Base Unit (2d Weather Region).

The 2d Weather Squadron was reconstituted on 10 August 1951 at Carswell Air Force Base, Texas, and assigned to the 2101st Air Weather Group (MAJCOM) on 5 September 1951. It was assigned to the 1st Weather Group in April 1952 and moved to Westover Air Force Base, Mass., in June 1955 and inactivated there on 8 October 1956.

The squadron was activated once again in May 1967 to the Military Airlift Command until the Air Weather Service organized the 2d Weather Squadron in June 1967 at Offutt Air Force Base, Neb. It was assigned to the 3d Weather Wing in June 1967, replacing Detachment 1, 3d Weather Wing, and was inactivated in July 1969.

The 2d Weather Squadron was activated at Andrews Air Force Base, Md., and assigned to Air Force Global Weather Central on 1 July 1975. It was assigned directly to Air Weather Service in January 1981 and to the 4th Weather Wing in January 1984, until it was inactivated 30 September 1991.

The 2nd WS's Detachment 11 became the 45th Weather Squadron, at Patrick Air Force Base, Florida in November, 1991.

When the Air Force Weather Agency was restructured in 2007, the 2nd Weather Squadron was activated on 28 March and assigned to the 2nd Weather Group.

== Awards ==
Service Streamer, American Theater, World War II, 7 Dec 1941 – 7 September 1944

Air Force Outstanding Unit Award, 1 July 1980 – 30 June 1982

== See also ==
- List of United States Air Force weather squadrons
