= 557th Weather Wing =

US Air Force unit

557th Weather Wing

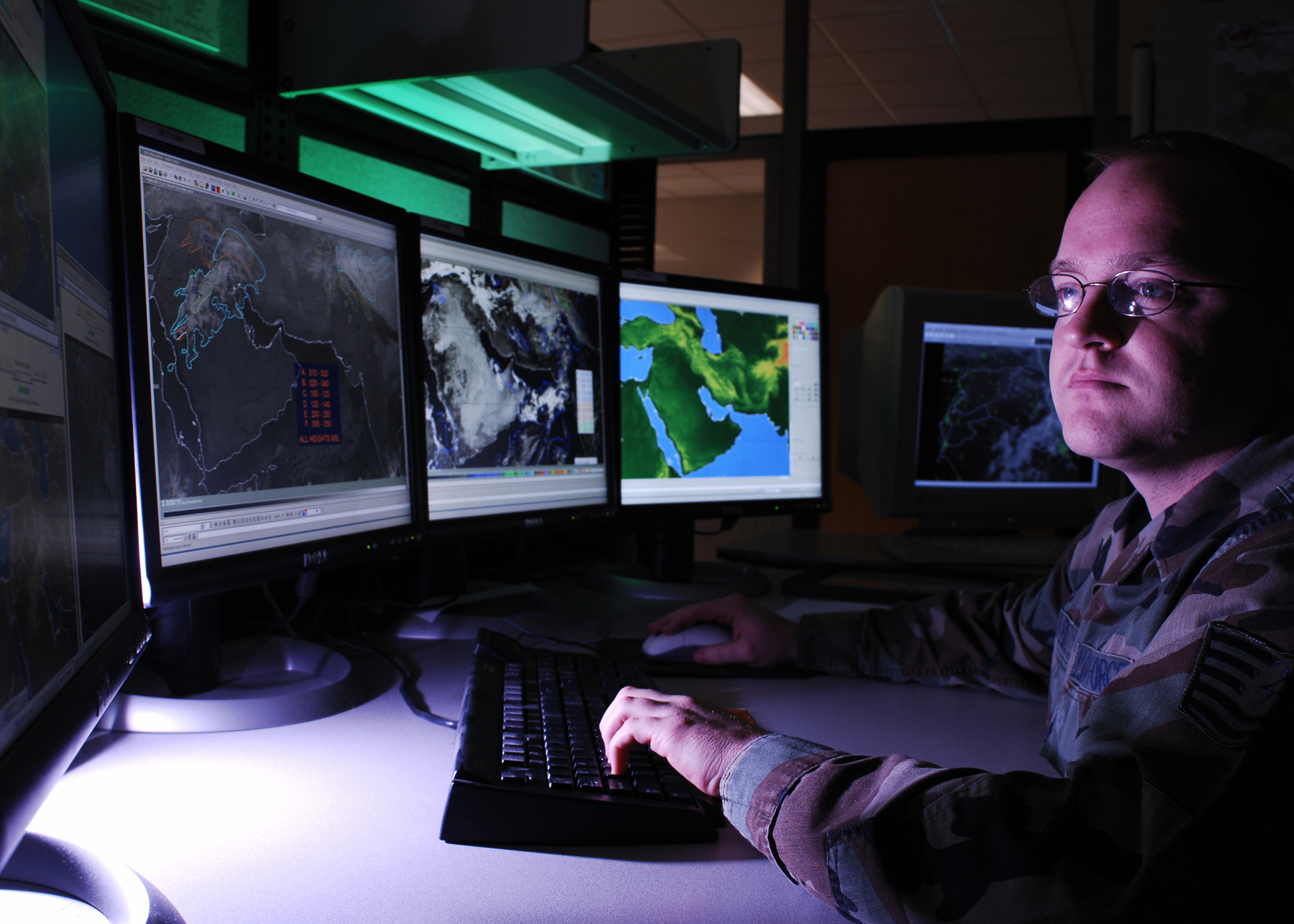
- Weather technician analyzes cloud bases for Southwest Asia at Offutt Air Force Base
- Active: 13 April 1943 – present (83 years, 5 months)
- Country: United States
- Branch: United States Air Force
- Role: Weather observation, reporting and analysis
- Part of: Air Combat Command: Sixteenth Air Force
- Garrison/HQ: Offutt Air Force Base, Nebraska
- Motto: Coelum Ad Proelium Elige (Latin for 'Choose the Weather for Battle')
- Decorations: Air Force Organizational Excellence Award

Commanders
- Current commander: Col. Kenneth Hank Chilcoat

Insignia
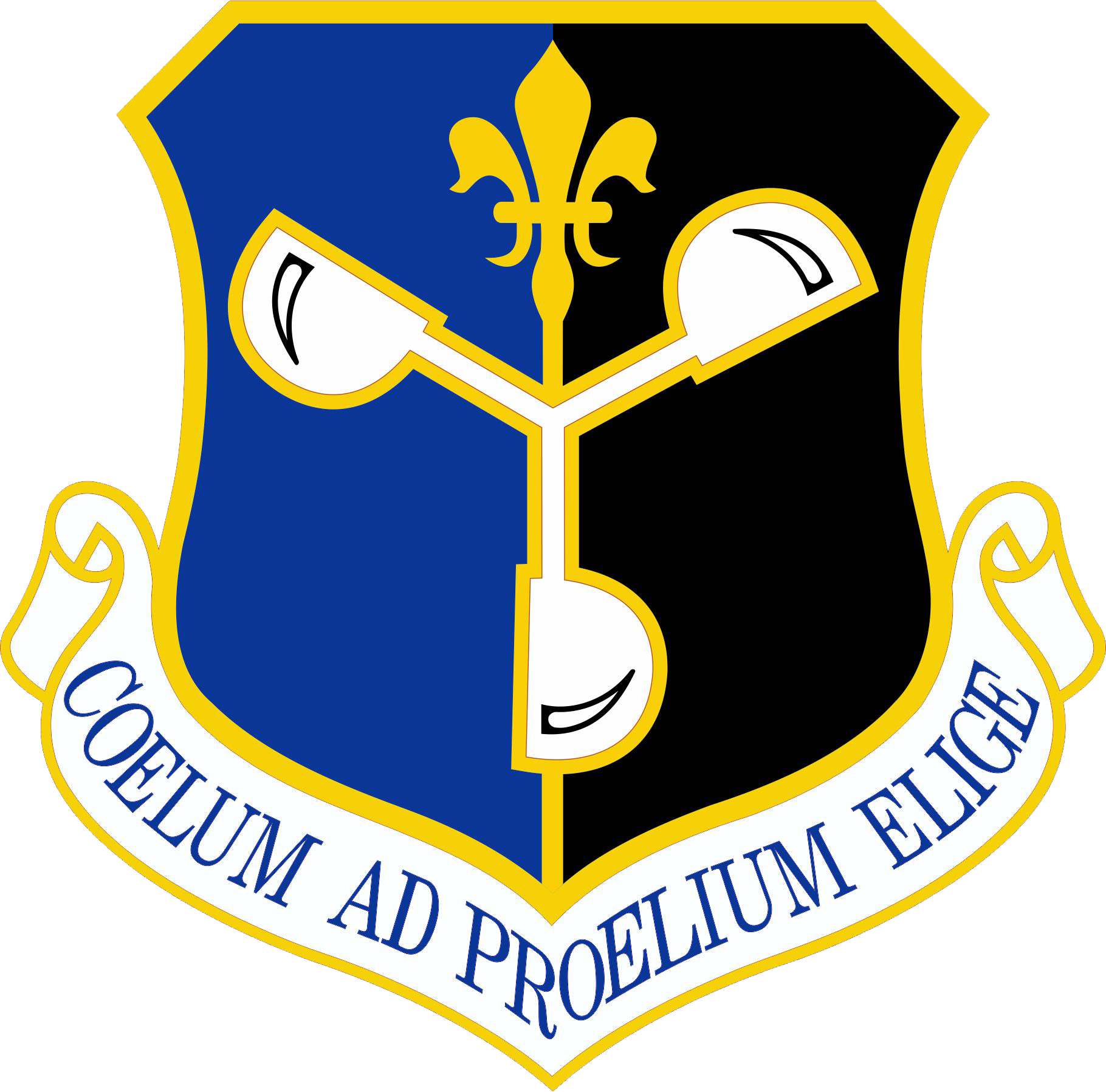
- 557th Weather Wing emblem (Note: Approved 24 July 1952. Used by The Army Air Forces Weather Service from 8 September 1942 and by the Weather Wing, Flight Control Command from its activation.)

The 557th Weather Wing is a United States Air Force formation and its lead military meteorology center. It reports environmental situational awareness worldwide to the Air Force, the United States Army, joint warfighters, Unified Combatant Commands, the national intelligence community, and the Secretary of Defense. It is headquartered at Offutt Air Force Base, in Bellevue, Nebraska.

The wing and subordinate weather squadrons collect, analyze, and generate a comprehensive weather database of forecast, climatological, and space weather products.

== Tasks ==
The wing's task is to provide weather information to American military forces anytime. It has over 1,800 active-duty, reserve, civilian and contract personnel and is headquartered on Offutt Air Force Base, Nebraska, with a $175 million annual budget. Weather forecasts are produced using numerical weather prediction software, such as the Weather Research and Forecasting model and the Unified Model.

== Organization ==
The 557th Weather Wing is organized into a headquarters element consisting of staff agencies, two groups, three directorates, and five solar observatories.

The 1st Weather Group, with headquarters at Offutt Air Force Base, aligns stateside weather operations with the Air Force war-fighting initiative overseeing Operational Weather Squadrons. Each of the squadrons produces forecasts for a specified area of the United States. The 15th Operational Weather Squadron, at Scott Air Force Base, Illinois, handles the Northern and Northeast United States; 25th Operational Weather Squadron, at Davis-Monthan Air Force Base, Arizona, handles the Western United States; and 26th Operational Weather Squadron, at Barksdale Air Force Base, Louisiana, handles the Southern United States. The squadrons also train enlisted and officers.

The 2nd Weather Group, with headquarters at Offutt Air Force Base, delivers terrestrial, space and climatological global weather information to Joint combatants, Department of Defense (DoD) decision-makers, national agencies, and allied nations for the planning and execution of missions across the complete spectrum of military operations through the operation, sustainment and maintenance of Air Force Weather's US$277 million strategic center computer complex, production network, and applications. The group is composed of the 2nd Weather Squadron, 2nd Systems Operations Squadron, the 2nd Weather Support Squadron, the 16th Weather Squadron, the 2nd Combat Weather Systems Squadron at Hurlburt Field, Florida, and the 14th Weather Squadron in Asheville, North Carolina. It also includes four solar observatories staffed by detachments of the 2nd Weather Squadron: Det. 1, Learmonth, Australia; Det. 2, Sagamore Hill, Massachusetts; Det. 4, Holloman AFB, New Mexico; and Det. 5, Palehua, Hawaii.

The Operations, Training and Evaluation Directorate (A3) delivers technical training for the career field, oversees the development of career field training plans and computer-based tutorials on new equipment, is constructing the first formal AFWWS Technical Training Program, and coordinates standardization and evaluation visits of wing units.

The Communications Directorate (A6) provides overall direction for the development of doctrine, policies and procedures, as well as professional, technical, and managerial expertise, for communication and information systems, information assurance, and information management for wing. They also provide communication and information policy, guidance, management, operations, software development, and maintenance of communications and computer systems and services to satisfy the centralized weather support requirements of the DoD and other government agencies. Directs the planning, programming, budgeting, acquisition, and life cycle management for all standard weather systems and computer processing equipment.

The Strategic Plans, Requirements and Programs Directorate (A5/A8) directs the planning, programming, budgeting, acquisition, and life cycle management for all standard weather systems and computer processing equipment. Equipping the weather force is mainly a function of the A8 directorate. They coordinate capabilities development conducted by three separate production centers and integrate them into a single Air Force Weather Weapon System.

The Lt. Gen. Thomas Samuel Moorman Building, valued at US$26.7 million, is the headquarters for the 557th Wing, with 188,000 sq ft (17,500 m^{2}). The three-story building, designed to support 1,100 people, and was scheduled to become fully operational by 2011 as the staff moved in increments.

== Component units ==
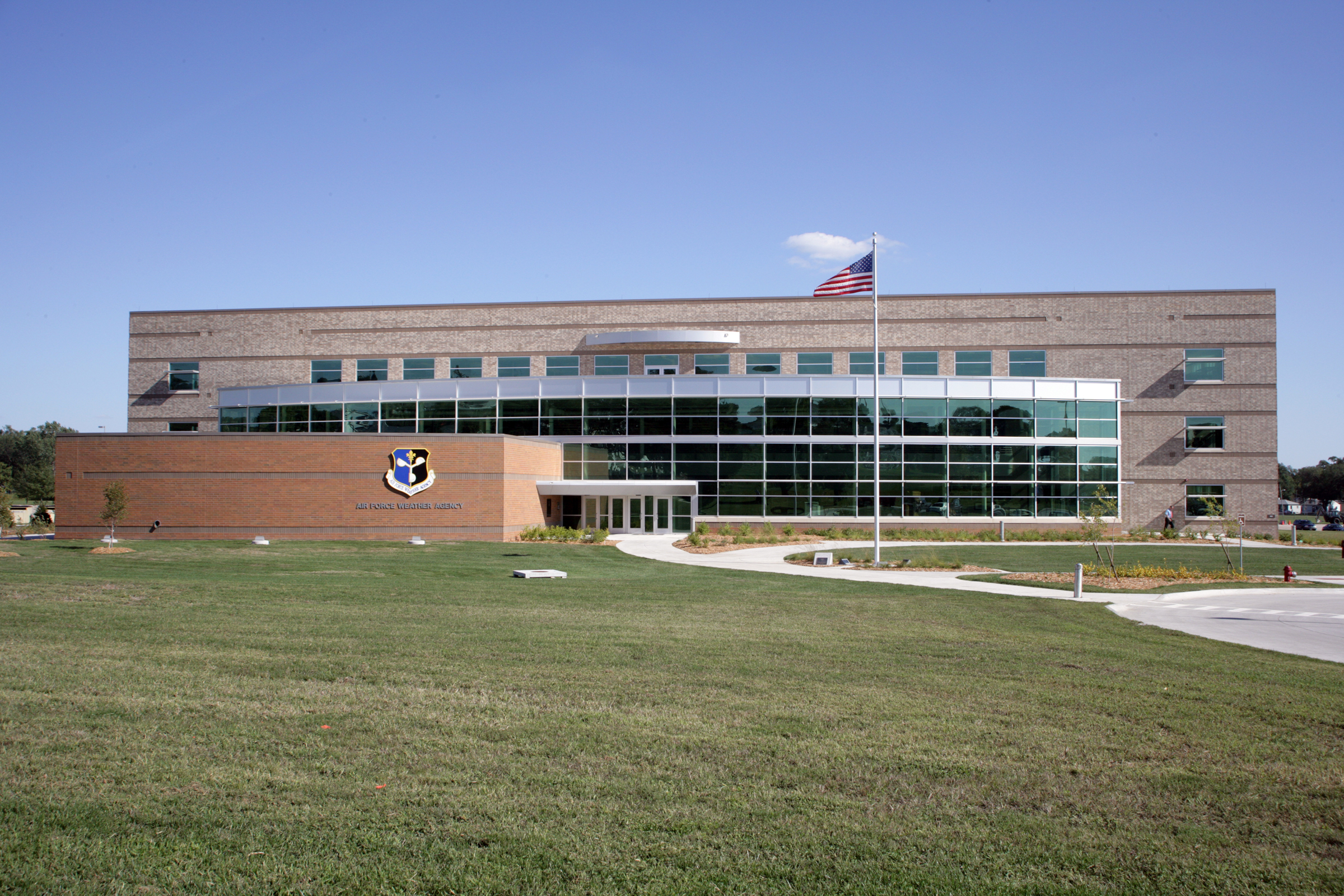
New AFWA building

Unless otherwise indicated, units are based at Offut AFB, Nebraska, and subordinate units are at the same location as their commanding group.

1st Weather Group

- 15th Operational Weather Squadron (Scott Air Force Base, Illinois)
- 17th Operational Weather Squadron (Joint Base Pearl Harbor–Hickam, Hawaii)
- 21st Operational Weather Squadron (Kapaun Air Station, Germany)
- 25th Operational Weather Squadron (Davis–Monthan Air Force Base, Arizona)
- 26th Operational Weather Squadron (Barksdale Air Force Base, Louisiana)
- 28th Operational Weather Squadron (Shaw Air Force Base, South Carolina)

2nd Weather Group

- 2nd Combat Weather Systems Squadron (Hurlburt Field, Florida)
- 2nd Systems Operations Squadron
- 2nd Weather Squadron
  - Detachment 1 (RAAF Base Learmonth, Australia)
  - Detachment 2 (Sagamore Hill Solar Observatory, Massachusetts)
  - Detachment 3 (San Vito dei Normanni Air Station, Italy)
  - Detachment 4 (Holloman Air Force Base, New Mexico)
  - Detachment 5 (Kaena Point Space Force Station, Hawaii)
  - Operating Location A (Peterson Space Force Base, Colorado)
  - Operating Location B (Joint Base Langley–Eustis, Virginia)
  - Operating Location D (Keesler Air Force Base, Mississippi)
  - Operating Location P (Boulder, Colorado)
- 2nd Weather Support Squadron
- 14th Weather Squadron (Federal Climate Complex, Asheville, North Carolina)
- 16th Weather Squadron

== History ==
=== Origins ===
The 557th Weather Wing can trace its heritage to the organization of the Meteorological Service of the United States Army Signal Corps, which was established during World War I. By 1937, the Army was supplementing the weather services of the United States Weather Bureau by operating thirty weather stations of its own in the United States and six more overseas. Because most of the Army stations were operated for the benefit of the Air Corps, on 1 July 1937, the Secretary of War transferred responsibility for Army weather services to the Office of the Chief of the Air Corps. This responsibility was given to the Weather Section, Office Chief of Air Corps, which was replaced by the Weather Section, Training & Operations Div, Air Corps on 20 June 41; the Director of Weather, Directorate of Technical Services, Operations Staff, Army Air Forces on 9 Mar 42; the Weather Unit, Assistant Chief Air Staff, Operations Commitments & Requirements (renamed the Weather Division, Assistant Chief Air Staff, Operations Commitments & Requirements on 9 March 1942.

Within the United States, the 1st, 2d, and 3d Weather Squadrons were organized. Each handled a region that was congruent with the area of responsibility of one of the three wings assigned to General Headquarters Air Force. (Note: In December 1940, the 4th Weather Squadron was added, providing one weather region for each of the four air districts(after April 1942, numbered air forces).)

=== World War II ===
On 24 July 1942, supervision of Army weather activities within the United States was centralized in the Army Air Forces Weather Service, (Note: This "Air Weather Service" was the name of a function, not an organization.) headed by the Director of Weather on the Air Staff. However, in 1943 the AAF reorganized to move as many operations out of Washington, D.C., as possible, and responsibility for the AAF Weather Service was transferred to Flight Control Command, which organized and activated the Weather Wing, Flight Control Command to manage this responsibility. This wing is the direct organizational ancestor of the 557th Weather Wing. By 3 May 1943, Flight Control Command had moved the headquarters of the Weather Wing to Asheville, North Carolina. Although responsibility for the AAF Weather Service was returned to the Air Staff in July, the wing remained in North Carolina. Although the AAF Weather Wing commanded weather activities in the United States, it had no authority over those in overseas theaters of operations. It influenced those units, however, by establishing procedures and standards for them to follow and by defining weather equipment requirements for the Signal Corps and operationally testing the equipment.

In July 1945, after the defeat of Germany, but while the war with Japan was still in progress, the AAF Weather Service and the AAF Weather Wing were combined and the wing was redesignated AAF Weather Service. This reorganization followed the successful examples of Air Transport Command (ATC) and Army Airways Communications System, concentrating responsibility in a single service with operational control of units providing the service. Action transferred overseas weather units to the command of the new service. On 7 January 1946, the service moved to Langley Field, Virginia.

In early 1946, the AAF determined to place its technical services under the command of ATC. On 13 March 1946, AAF Weather Service was redesignated Air Weather Service and along with Air Communications Service, Air Rescue Service. and Air Pictorial Service, assigned to ATC Soon afterwards it moved to Gravelly Point, Virginia, where it was collocated with ATC headquarters.

=== Weather reconnaissance ===
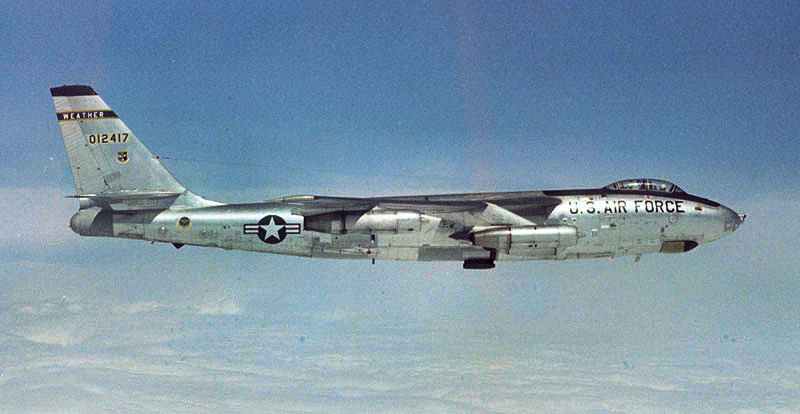
Air Weather Service Boeing WB-47 (Note: Aircraft is Boeing WB-47E Stratojet, serial 51-2417. Originally a Boeing B-47E-60-BW and later converted to a WB-47. This plane was transferred to the Military Aircraft Storage and Disposition Center on 12 September 1969. It was declared excess six days later and scrapped. Baugher, Joe (8 September 2023). "1951 USAF Serial Numbers". Joe Baugher.)

During the war, the AAF had developed weather reconnaissance units for scouting and route weather observation and reporting, but these units remained under the command of theater commanders or ATC. Once Air Weather Service became part of ATC, the time was ripe to place a weather reconnaissance unit under its command. In July 1946, it established the Air Weather Group (Provisional) at Morrison Field, Florida. In October, this group was taken out of provisional status and became the 308th Reconnaissance Group, Weather.

=== Expansion worldwide ===
With the formation of the United States Air Force in 1947, Air Weather Service assumed the responsibility of worldwide weather reporting and forecasting for both the Air Force and the Army. In 1948, Air Weather Service moved to Andrews Air Force Base, Maryland, and was assigned to the newly activated Military Air Transport Service, which was later redesignated Military Airlift Command. Air Weather Service moved to Scott Air Force Base, Illinois, in 1958, where it remained for nearly four decades.

=== Transfer of weather functions to the operational commands ===
Air Force Weather, organized as the Air Weather Service from 1947 to 1993, continued to provide environmental awareness for both the Air Force and the Army. By 1991, Air Weather Service had divested itself of its major field structure and the bulk of Air Force Weather was realigned under the direct administration of the supported commands.

Air Force Weather Agency and its predecessors have been essentially instrumental in protecting life and property at home as well. Since World War II, Air Force weather personnel have provided hurricane reconnaissance. In 1948, two Air Force weather officers issued the first tornado warning. Air Force Weather participated in the nation's development's severe storm forecasting centers.

With its early adoption of emerging computing and communications technologies, Air Force Weather was at the fore of the Space Age. In the 1960s, Air Force Weather began assimilating weather data collected from meteorological satellites. Air Force Weather, as the single agent for all the DoD, began solar observations and forecasting.

Air Force Weather endorsed the Information Revolution early in the 1980s with tools that provided state-of-the art computing at the lowest echelons to gather, process, and disseminate weather data. In concert with Air Force communicators, Air Force Weather constructed communications networks that enabled weather information to be disseminated around the world in moments. Today, the Air Force Weather Agency, through its Weather Product Management and Distribution System at Offutt AFB, employs the internet to rapidly disseminate weather data around the globe.

Working with the other national agencies, Air Force Weather has been instrumental in the development of modern meteorological technologies, such as the deployment of NEXRAD, the Next Generation Radar, in the 1990s. Air Force Weather continues to refine and develop forecasting models relevant for modern military operations.

In April 1991, the Office of the Director of Weather was created on the Air Staff to provide policy and guidance for Air Force Weather.

The Air Force designated Air Weather Service a field operating agency and reassigned it to Headquarters United States Air Force in 1993. On 15 Oct. 1997, Air Weather Service was redesignated the Air Force Weather Agency and moved to Offutt Air Force Base, Nebraska.

On 27 March 2015, the Air Force Weather Agency was redesignated as the 557th Weather Wing and was aligned under the United States Air Force's Air Combat Command, Twelfth Air Force.

On 29 October 2019, the 557th Weather Wing was transferred to the USAF Air Combat Command's Sixteenth Air Force (Air Forces Cyber).

== Lineage ==
- Constituted as the Weather Wing, Flight Control Command on 14 April 1943 and activated

Redesignated Army Air Forces Weather Wing on 6 July 1943
Redesignated Army Air Forces Weather Service on 1 July 1945
Redesignated Air Weather Service on 13 March 1946
Redesignated Air Force Weather Agency on 15 October 1997
Redesignated 557th Weather Wing 27 March 2015

=== Assignments ===
- Flight Control Command 14 April 1943
- Army Air Forces, 6 July 1943
- Air Transport Command, 13 March 1946
- Military Air Transport Command (later Military Airlift Command), 1 June 1948
- United States Air Force, 1 April 1991
- Twelfth Air Force, 17 March 2015
- Sixteenth Air Force, c. 29 October 2019

=== Stations ===
- Washington, DC (Pentagon), 14 April 1943
- Asheville, North Carolina, 3 May 1943
- Langley Field, Virginia, 7 January 1946
- Gravelly Point, Virginia, 14 June 1946
- Andrews Air Force Base, Maryland, 1 December 1948
- Scott Air Force Base, Illinois, 23 June 1958
- Offutt Air Force Base, Nebraska, 15 October 1997

=== Components ===
==== Wings ====
- 1st Weather Wing, 8 February 1954 – c. 15 February 1991
- 2d Weather Wing, 8 February 1954 – 1 October 1991
- 3d Weather Wing, 8 February 1954 – c. 16 July 1991
- 4th Weather Wing, 8 August 1959 – 30 June 1972, 1 October 1983 – c. 15 September 1991
- 5th Weather Wing, 8 October 1965 – c. 15 September 1991
- 6th Weather Wing, 8 October 1965 – 1 August 1975
- 7th Weather Wing, 8 October 1965 – 30 June 1972, 1 January 1976 – c. 15 September 1991
- 9th Weather Reconnaissance Wing, 8 October 1965 – 1 September 1975
- 43d Weather Wing, c. October 1945 – 3 June 1948
- 43d Weather Wing (later 2043d Air Weather Wing, 2143d Air Weather Wing), 1 June 1948 – 8 February 1954
- 59th Weather Wing, c. December 1945 – 3 October 1947
- 59th Weather Wing (later 2059th Air Weather Wing), 1 June 1948 – 1 June 1952
- 2043d Air Weather Wing (see 43d Weather Wing)
- 2058th Air Weather Wing (see 2105th Air Weather Group)
- 2059th Air Weather Wing (see 59th Weather Wing)
- 2143d Air Weather Wing (see 43d Weather Wing)
- Continental Weather Wing (see 67th AAF Base Unit)
- Domestic Weather Wing (see 67th AAF Base Unit)

==== Groups ====
- 1st Air Weather Group (Provisional), 19 July 1946 – 17 October 1946
- 1st Weather Group, 20 April 1952 – 8 October 1956, 3 May 2006 – present
- 2d Weather Group, 20 April 1952 – 8 October 1965, 28 February 2007 – present
- 3d Weather Group, 20 April 1952 – 8 August 1959
- 4th Weather Group, 20 April 1952 – 8 October 1965
- 6th Weather Group, 20 April 1952 – 18 June 1958
- 7th Weather Group, 20 April 1952 – 18 June 1958
- 7th Weather Group (later 2107th Air Weather Group), 1 June 1948 – 20 April 1952
- 8th Weather Group, 20 April 1952 – 8 October 1965
- 9th Weather Group (later 9th Weather Reconnaissance Group), 20 April 1952 – 8 July 1965
- 101st Weather Group (see 68th AAF Base Unit)
- 102d Weather Group (see 74th AAF Base Unit)
- 103d Weather Group (see 70th AAF Base Unit)
- 104th Weather Group (see 71st AAF Base Unit)
- 308th Reconnaissance Group, Weather, 17 October 1946 – 5 January 1951
- 2105th Air Weather Group (later 2058th Air Weather Wing), 1 January 1949 – 8 February 1954
- 2107th Air Weather Group (see 7th Weather Group)

==== Squadrons ====
- 1st Weather Squadron, 3 May 1943 – 7 September 1944
- 2d Weather Squadron, 3 May 1943 – 7 September 1944, 8 July 1967 – 8 July 1969, 1 August 1975 – 1 January 1976
- 3d Weather Squadron, 3 May 1943 – 7 September 1944
- 4th Weather Squadron, 3 May 1943 – 7 September 1944
- 8th Weather Squadron, 3 May 1943 – 1945, June 1952 – 8 February 1954
- 9th Weather Squadron, 3 May 1943 – 7 September 1944
- 10th Weather Squadron, October 1945 – 3 July 1946
- 11th Weather Squadron, October 1945 – December 1945
- 12th Weather Squadron, 30 June 1972 – 1 January 1976
- 16th Weather Squadron, 3 May 1943 – December 1945
- 18th Weather Squadron, October 1945 – August 1946
- 19th Weather Squadron, July 1945 – August 1946
- 22d Weather Squadron, December 1943 – 5 February 1946
- 23d Weather Squadron, 1 November 1943 – 7 September 1944
- 24th Weather Squadron, 1 November 1943 – 7 September 1944, 30 June 1972 – 1 January 1976
- 25th Weather Squadron, 1 November 1943 – 7 September 1944
- 27th Weather Squadron, 5 June 1945 – 3 November 1945
- 28th Weather Squadron, 5 June 1945 – 9 November 1945
- 36th Weather Squadron, 3 October 1949 – 23 June 1951
- 37th Weather Squadron, 3 October 1949 – 23 June 1951
- 38th Weather Squadron, 3 October 1949 – 23 June 1951
- 53d Reconnaissance Squadron, 20 March 1946 – 17 October 1946, 2 April 1951 – 20 April 1953
- 54th Reconnaissance Squadron, 20 March 1946 – 1 August 1947
- 55th Reconnaissance Squadron, 20 March 1946 – 15 October 1947, 21 February 1951 – 20 April 1953
- 57th Reconnaissance Squadron, 21 February – 21 May 1951
- 59th Reconnaissance Squadron, 20 March 1946 – 15 October 1947 (attached to 1st Air Weather Group [Provisional] 19 July 1946 – 17 October 1946)
- 2150th Air Weather Squadron (later 1210th Weather Squadron), 1 July 1960 – 1 May 1963

==== Army Air Forces Base Units ====
- 66th AAF Base Unit (Weather Technician Unit, later Redeployment and Training Unit), 7 September 1944 – 10 May 1946
- 67th AAF Base Unit (Tuskegee Weather Detachment), 7 September 1944 – 27 April 1945
- 67th AAF Base Unit (Weather Qualification and Service Group, later Redeployment and Training Unit), 27 April 1945 – 1 June 1945
- 67th AAF Base Unit (Domestic Weather Wing, later Continental Weather Wing), 1 October 1945 – 26 September 1947
- 68th AAF Base Unit (1st Weather Region, later 101st Weather Group), 7 September 1944 – 26 September 1947
- 69th AAF Base Unit (2d Weather Region), 7 September 1944 – 1 October 1945
- 70th AAF Base Unit (3d Weather Region, later 103d Weather Group), 7 September 1944 – 3 June 1948
- 71st AAF Base Unit (4th Weather Region, later 104th Weather Group), 7 September 1944 – 3 June 1948
- 72d AAF Base Unit (23d Weather Region), 7 September 1944 – 1 October 1945
- 72d AAF Base Unit (Special Projects Unit), 1 October 1945 – 21 April 1947
- 73d AAF Base Unit (24th Weather Region), 7 September 1944 – 1 October 1945
- 74th AAF Base Unit (25th Weather Region, later 102d Weather Group), 7 September 1944 – 26 September 1947

(Note: After September 1947, Air Force Base Units.)

Other

- Air Force Space Forecast Center, 16 October 1991 – 1 October 1994
- USAF Environmental Technological Applications Center (later Air Force Combat Climatology Center, Air Force Combat Climatology Squadron), 1 July 1991 – 19 October 2007
- Air Force Global Weather Central (later Air Force Global Weather Center), 8 July 1969 – 1 July 1972
- Combat Weather Facility (later Air Force Combat Weather Center), 19 January 1995 – 1 April 2009

=== Awards and campaigns ===
Award streamer	Award	Dates	Notes
	Air Force Organizational Excellence Award	1 May 1984 – 30 April 1986	Air Weather Service
	Air Force Organizational Excellence Award	1 May 1986 – 30 April 1988	Air Weather Service
	Air Force Organizational Excellence Award	1 September 1993–30 September 1995	Air Weather Service
	Air Force Organizational Excellence Award	1 October 1995–0 September 1996	Air Weather Service
	Air Force Organizational Excellence Award	1 September 1996–30 September 1998	Air Weather Service (later Air Force Weather Agency)
	Air Force Organizational Excellence Award	1 October 1998–30 September 1999	Air Force Weather Agency
	Air Force Organizational Excellence Award	1 October 1999–30 September 2001	Air Force Weather Agency
	Air Force Organizational Excellence Award	1 October 2001–30 September 2003	Air Force Weather Agency

- 2000 Air Force Association Theodore Von Karman Award

Campaign Streamer	Campaign	Dates	Notes
	American Theater without inscription	14 April 1943 – 2 March 1946	Weather Wing, Flight Control Command (later AAF Weather Wing, AAF Weather Service)

== See also ==
- List of United States Air Force weather squadrons
- Thomas Samuel Moorman
- Donald Norton Yates
