= List of air refueling wings of the United States Air Force =

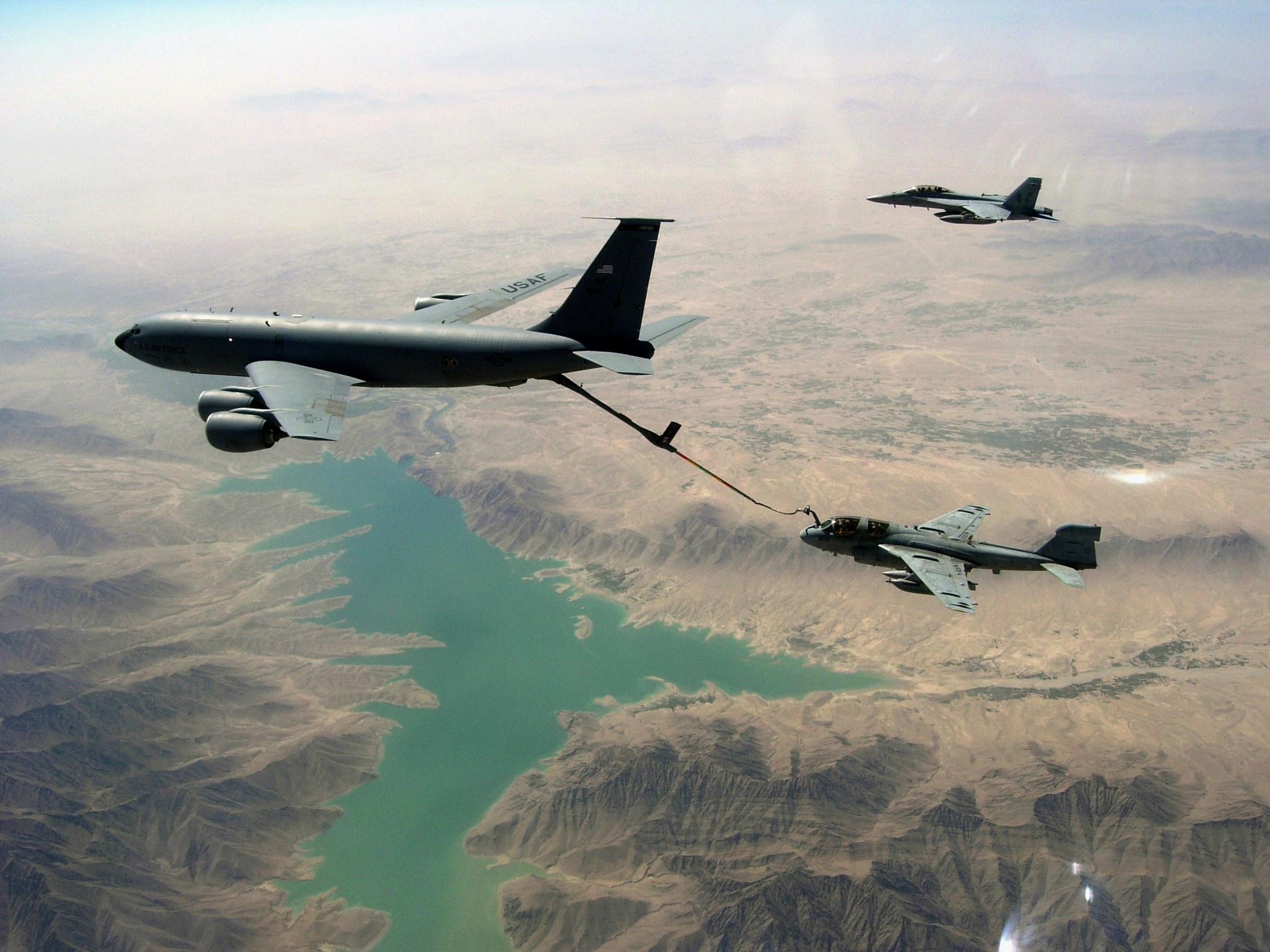
KC-135R refueling Navy aircraft in Afghanistan

The United States Air Force organized its first air refueling squadrons in 1948. In 1955, Strategic Air Command (SAC) organized the first wing to command air refueling units at Dow Air Force Base, Maine. Since then, air refueling wings have been organized by Tactical Air Command (TAC), Military Airlift Command (MAC), United States Air Forces in Europe (USAFE) and Air Mobility Command (AMC). Additional wings have been organized in the Air National Guard (ANG) and the Air Reserves (AFRES). (Note: In addition to the wings listed, The 335th Bombardment Group was redesignated the 335th Air Refueling Wing in July 1985. It retains this designation, but it has not been active under any designation since the redesignation. Department of the Air Force/MPM Letter 648q, 31 July 1985, Subject: Reconstitution, Redesignation, and Consolidation of Selected Air Force Organizations)

== Background ==
Prior to 1991, some refueling wings' full designations also included an additional parenthetical. They included:

- Air Refueling Wing, Heavy: Boeing KC-135 Stratotanker, McDonnell Douglas KC-10 Extender
- Air Refueling Wing, Medium: Boeing KC-97 Stratofreighter, Boeing KB-29 Superfortress, Boeing KB-50 Superfortress
- Air Refueling Wing, Tactical: Boeing KC-97 Stratofreighter, Boeing KB-29 Superfortress, Boeing KB-50 Superfortress
- Air Refueling Wing, Fighter-Bomber: Boeing KB-29 Superfortress
- Air Refueling Wing (Training): Boeing KC-97 Stratofreighter

Air refueling squadrons were also assigned to other types of wings, most frequently to bombardment wings, but also to strategic wings, strategic aerospace wings, strategic fighter wings, fighter-bomber wings, tactical reconnaissance wings, or (generic) wings.

== List of wings ==
Wing	Dates active	Station	Previous designation	Subsequent designation	Command of assignment	Notes
6th Air Refueling Wing	1 October 1996 – 1 January 2001, 30 September 2019 – present	MacDill AFB	6th Air Base Wing, 6th Air Mobility Wing	active	AMC	
11th Air Refueling Wing	2 July 1968 – 25 May 1969	Altus AFB	11th Bombardment Wing	11th Strategic Group	SAC	
19th Air Refueling Wing	1 October 1983 – 1 July 1996	Robins AFB	19th Bombardment Wing	19th Airlift Wing	SAC, AMC	
22nd Air Refueling Wing	1 October 1982 – present	March AFB; McConnell AFB	22nd Bombardment Wing	active	SAC, AMC	
43rd Air Refueling Wing	1 June 1992 – 1 July 1994	Malmstrom AFB	43rd Bombardment Wing	43rd Air Refueling Group	AMC	
68th Air Refueling Wing	1 October 1986 – 22 April 1991	Seymour Johnson AFB	68th Bombardment Wing	68th Electronic Combat Group	SAC	
92nd Air Refueling Wing	1 July 1994 – present	Fairchild AFB	92nd Bomb Wing	active	AMC	
100th Air Refueling Wing	30 September 1976 – 15 March 1983; 1 February 1992 – present	Beale AFB, RAF Mildenhall	100th Strategic Reconnaissance Wing, 100th Air Division	active	SAC, USAFE	
101st Air Refueling Wing	1 April 1976 – present	Bangor IAP	101st Fighter-Interceptor Wing	active	ANG	
106th Air Refueling Wing	c. September 1969 – 1 December 1972	Floyd Bennett Field; Suffolk County Airport	none	none	ANG	(Note: The wing replaced the 106th Military Airlift Wing, but was a newly-constituted unit. It was replaced by the 106th Fighter-Interceptor Wing, which again was a newly-constituted unit.)
107th Air Refueling Wing	c. 16 October 1995 – c. 1 July 2008	Niagara Falls ARS	107th Air Refueling Group	107th Airift Wing	ANG	
108th Air Refueling Wing	19 October 1991 – c. 1 December 2009	McGuire AFB	108th Tactical Fighter Wing	108th Wing	ANG	
117th Air Refueling Wing	c. 16 October 1994 – present	Sumpter Smith ANGB	117th Reconnaissance Wing	active	ANG	
121st Air Refueling Wing	c. 16 January 1993 – present	Rickenbacker ANGB	121st Fighter Wing	active	ANG	
126th Air Refueling Wing	1 July 1961 – present	O'Hare IAP; Scott AFB	126th Air Defense Wing	active	ANG	
128th Air Refueling Wing	c. 16 October 1995 – present	Billy Mitchell Field	128th Air Refueling Group	active	ANG	
134th Air Refueling Wing	c. 16 October 1995 – present	McGhee-Tyson Airport	134th Air Refueling Group	active	ANG	
136th Air Refueling Wing	c. 1 October 1964 – 8 April 1978	Hensley Field	136th Air Defense Wing	136th Tactical Airlift Wing	ANG	
137th Air Refueling Wing	c. 1 October 2008 – 1 October 2015	Will Rogers World Airport	137th Airlift Wing	137th Special Operations Wing	ANG	
141st Air Refueling Wing	1 July 1976 – present	Fairchild AFB	none	active	ANG	
151st Air Refueling Wing	c. 16 October 1995 – present	Utah ANGB	151st Air Refueling Group	active	ANG	
155th Air Refueling Wing	c. 16 October 1995 – present	Nebraska ANGB	155th Air Refueling Group	active	ANG	
157th Air Refueling Wing	c. 16 October 1995 – present	Pease ANGB	157th Air Refueling Group	active	ANG	
161st Air Refueling Wing	c. 16 October 1995 – present	Phoenix Sky Harbor Airport	161st Air Refueling Group	active	ANG	
163d Air Refueling Wing	c. 16 October 1995 – c. 20 November 2007	March ARB	163rd Air Refueling Group	163rd Reconnaissance Wing	ANG	
168th Air Refueling Wing	c. 16 October 1995 – present	Eielson AFB	168th Air Refueling Group	active	ANG	
171st Air Refueling Wing	4 October 1972 – present	Greater Pittsburgh IAP	none	active	ANG	(Note: The wing replaced the 171st Aeromedical Airlift Wing, but was a newly-constituted unit. The two wings were consolidated on 18 August 1987.)
184th Air Refueling Wing	14 August 2002 – c. 1 April 2008	McConnell AFB	184th Bombardment Wing	184th Intelligence wing	ANG	
185th Air Refueling Wing	1 June 2003 – present	Colonel Bud Day Field	185th Fighter Group	active	ANG	
186th Air Refueling Wing	c. 16 October 1995 – present	Key Field	186th Air Refueling Group	active	ANG	
190th Air Refueling Wing	c. 16 October 1995 – present	Forbes Field	190th Air Refueling Group	active	ANG	
301st Air Refueling Wing	15 June 1964 – 30 September 1979; 5 January 1988 – 1 June 1992	Rickenbacker AFB; Malmstrom AFB	301st Bombardment Wing	(Note: The wing was redesignated 311th Air Refueling Wing in inactive status, but this action was later revoked.)	SAC	
305th Air Refueling Wing	1 January 1970 – 1 October 1994	Grissom AFB	305th Bombardment Wing	305th Air Mobility Wing	SAC, AMC	
319th Air Refueling Wing	1 October 1993 – 1 March 2011	Grand Forks AFB	319th Bomb Wing	319th Air Base Wing	AMC	
334th Air Refueling Wing	not active as a refueling wing		334th Bombardment Group	334th Air Expeditionary Group		
336th Air Refueling Wing	not active as a refueling wing		336th Bombardment Group	336th Crew Training Group (Note: The wing was consolidated with the 3636th Combat Crew Training Wing in January 1993.)		
340th Air Refueling Wing	1 October 1984 – 1 October 1992	Altus AFB	340th Bombardment Wing	340th Flying Training Group	SAC, AMC	
380th Air Refueling Wing	1 July 1992 – 30 September 1995	Plattsburgh AFB	380th Bombardment Wing	380th Air Expeditionary Wing	SAC, AMC	
384th Air Refueling Wing	15 November 1972 – 1 July 1987	McConnell AFB	384th Bombardment Wing	384th Bombardment Wing	SAC	
434th Air Refueling Wing	1 October 1994 – present	Grissom ARB	434th Wing	active	AFRES	
452d Air Refueling Wing	1 October 1976 – 1 May 1994	March ARB	452nd Tactical Airlift Wing	452nd Air Mobility Wing	AFRES	
459th Air Refueling Wing	1 October 2003 – present	JB Andrews	459th Airlift Wing	active	AFRES	
497th Air Refueling Wing	1 January 1963 – 15 September 1964	Plattsburgh AFB	none (Note: Replaced 4108th Air Refueling Wing.)	none (Note: Consolidated with 497th Bombardment Group on 31 January 1984. Department of the Air Force/MPM Letter 539q, 31 January 1984, Subject: Consolidation of Units.)	SAC	
499th Air Refueling Wing	1 January 1963 – 25 June 1966	Westover AFB	none (Note: Replaced 4050th Air Refueling Wing.)	none (Note: Consolidated with 499th Bombardment Group on 31 January 1984. Department of the Air Force/MPM Letter 539q, 31 January 1984, Subject: Consolidation of Units.)	SAC	
500th Air Refueling Wing	1 January 1963 – 15 December 1964	Selfridge AFB	none (Note: Replaced 4045th Air Refueling Wing.)	none (Note: Consolidated with 500th Bombardment Group on 31 January 1984. Department of the Air Force/MPM Letter 539q, 31 January 1984, Subject: Consolidation of Units.)	SAC	
722nd Air Refueling Wing	1 January 1994-1 April 1996	March ARB	none (Note: Absorbed residual elements of 22nd Air Refueling Wing, which moved to McConnell AFB.)	none	AMC	
Air Refueling Wing, Provisional, 802nd	c. 10 August 1990 – c. 10 April 1991	Southwest Asia	none	none	SAC	
Air Refueling Wing, Provisional, 804th	c. 1 September 1990 – c. 12 April 1991	Incirlik AB	none	none	SAC	
914th Air Refueling Wing	1 June 2017 – present	Niagara Falls ARS	914th Airlift Wing	active	AFRES	
916th Air Refueling Wing	1 October 1994 – present	Seymour Johnson AFB	916th Air Refueling Group	active	AFRES	
927th Air Refueling Wing	1 October 1994 – present	Selfridge ANGB; MacDill AFB	927th Air Refueling Group	active	AFRES	
931st Air Refueling Wing	5 March 2016 – present	McConnell AFB	931st Air Refueling Group	active	AFRES	
939th Air Refueling Wing	1 April 2003 – 30 June 2008	Portland ANGB	939th Rescue Wing	none	AFRES	
940th Air Refueling Wing	1 October 1994 – 1 July 2009; 29 April 2016 – present	McClellan AFB; Beale AFB	940th Air Refueling Group; 940th Wing	active	AFRES	
Air Refueling Wing, Provisional, 1700th	c. 19 August 1990 – c. 11 March 1991	Al Taif AB	none	none	AFCENT	
Air Refueling Wing, Provisional, 1701st	c. 7 August 1990 – c. November 1990	King Abdulaziz AB	none	Strategic Wing, Provisional, 1701	AFCENT	
Air Refueling Wing, Provisional, 1702nd	21 September 1990 – c. 8 March 1991	Muscat Seeb Airport	none	none	AFCENT	
Air Refueling Wing, Provisional, 1703rd	c. 10 August 1990 – c. 10 March 1991	King Khalid IAP	none	none	AFCENT	
Air Refueling Wing, Provisional, 1706th	c. 28 September 1990 – c. 24 May 1991	Cairo West AB	none	none	AFCENT	
Air Refueling Wing, Provisional, 1707th	c. 1990 – c. 1991	RAFO Masirah	none	none	AFCENT	
Air Refueling Wing, Provisional, 1709th	c. 7 August 1990 – c. 14 March 1991	King Abdulaziz AB	none	none	AFCENT	
Air Refueling Wing, Provisional, 1710th	c. 19 1990 – c. 1991	Southwest Asia	none	none	AFCENT	
Air Refueling Wing, Provisional, 1711th	c. October 1990 – c. March 1991	King Khalid IAP	none	none	AFCENT	
Air Refueling Wing, Provisional, 1712th	c. 20 December 1990 – c. 14 March 1991	Al Minhad AB	none	none	AFCENT	
Air Refueling Wing, Provisional, 1713th	c. October 1990 – c. March 1991	Dubai IAP	none	none	AFCENT	
4045th Air Refueling Wing	1 July 1959 – 1 January 1963	Selfridge AFB	none	none (Note: Replaced by 500th Air Refueling Wing. Ravenstein, pp. 272-273)	SAC	
4050th Air Refueling Wing	1 April 1955 – 1 January 1963	Westover AFB	none	none (Note: Replaced by 499th Air Refueling Wing.)	SAC	
4060th Air Refueling Wing	8 March 1955 – 1 February 1960	Dow AFB	none	none	SAC	
4061st Air Refueling Wing	1 July 1957 – 15 July 1961	Malmstrom AFB	none	none (Note: Subordinate base support units transferred to 341st Strategic Missile Wing. Ravenstein, Combat Wings, p. 181)	SAC	
4108th Air Refueling Wing	1 January 1961 – 1 January 1963	Plattsburgh AFB	none	none (Note: Replaced by 497th Air Refueling Wing.)	SAC	
4397th Air Refueling Wing	1 July 1958 – 15 June 1962	Randolph AFB	none (Note: Absorbed the Boeing B-47 Stratojet resources of the 3510th Combat Crew Training Wing.)	none	SAC	
4505th Air Refueling Wing	1 July 1958 – 8 October 1963	Langley AFB	none	none	SAC	
