= 51st Bombardment Squadron =

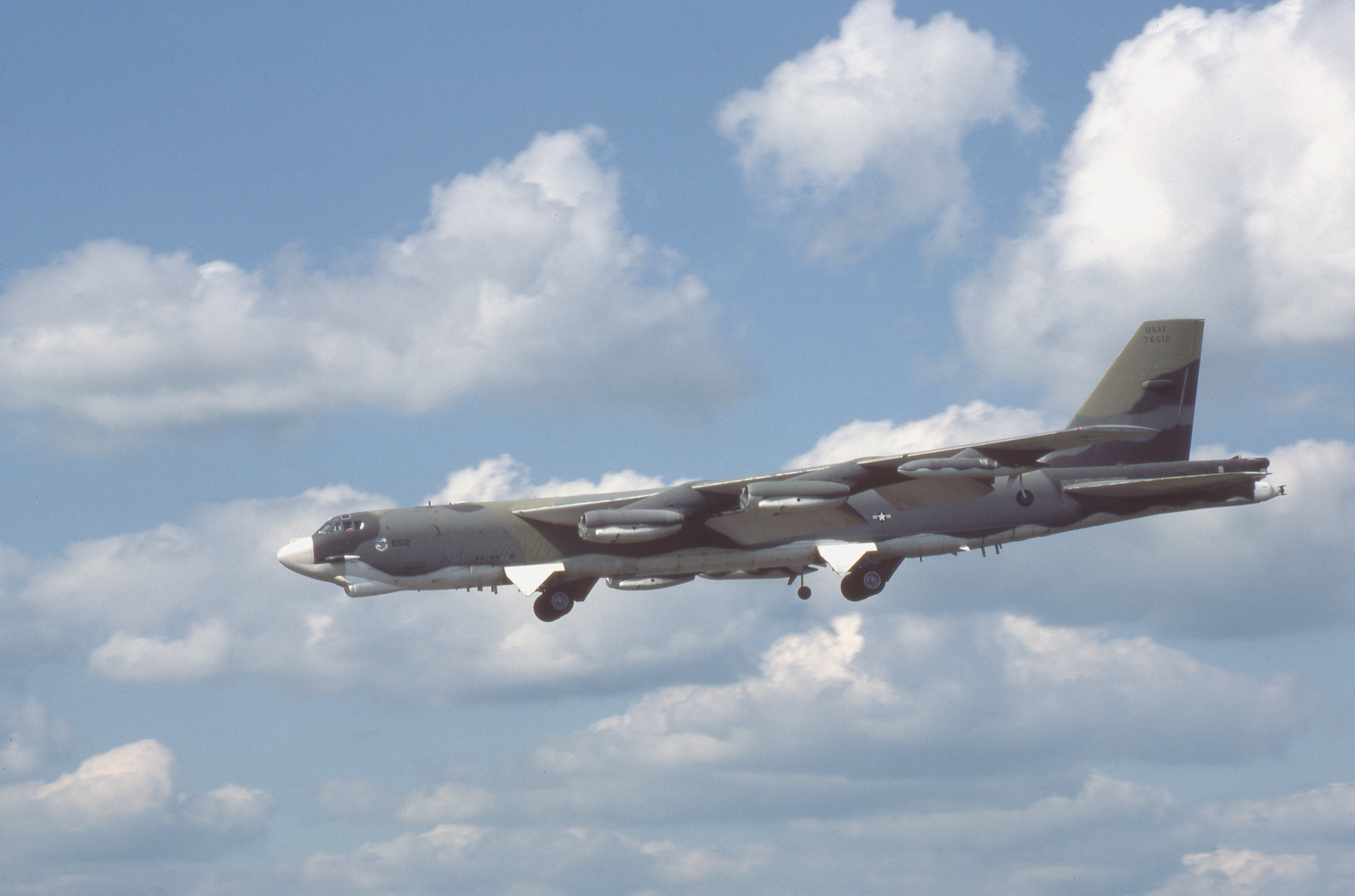
- B-52G as flown by the squadron
- Active: 1947–1949; 1951–1982
- Country: United States
- Branch: United States Air Force
- Role: strategic bomber
- Decorations: Air Force Outstanding Unit Award

Insignia
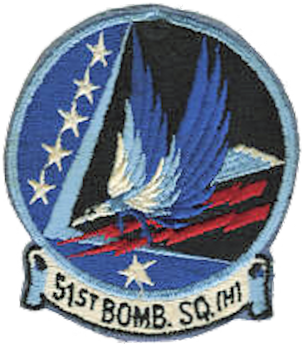
- Patch with 51st Bombardment Squadron emblem (B-52 era)

- 51st Bombardment Squadron emblem (B-47 era)

The 51st Bombardment Squadron is an inactive United States Air Force unit. It was last assigned to the 68th Bombardment Wing at Seymour Johnson Air Force Base, North Carolina, where it was inactivated on 30 September 1982.

The squadron was first activated in 1947 in the reserve as the 51st Reconnaissance Squadron. It does not appear to have been fully manned or equipped before it was inactivated in the 1949 military budget cuts. It was reactivated as part of Strategic Air Command as the 51st Strategic Reconnaissance Squadron, but soon converted to the strategic bomber mission. It continued this mission with Boeing B-47 Stratojets and Boeing B-52 Stratofortresses until inactivating 30 years later.

== History ==
=== Air Force reserve ===
The squadron first activated in the reserve in August 1947 as the 51st Reconnaissance Squadron at Hamilton Field, where it was assigned to the 68th Reconnaissance Group. The 415th AAF Base Unit (later the 2346 AF Reserve Training Center) of Air Defense Command supervised the squadron's training.

As the post war Air Force took shape, the National Guard was considered the first line of reserve. Reserve units got what was left over after National Guard units received facilities, equipment and aircraft. Aircraft were allotted to reserve units as a means of maintaining flying proficiency, not combat readiness. Aircraft assigned to the reserves were overwhelmingly trainers, with a few fighters and no bombers. The fighters had been withdrawn in December 1946, and no heavy bombers were ever assigned. The allotment of units to the reserves was made only for planning purposes and mobilization plans called for personnel assigned to the units to be called to active duty during mobilization as individuals, not as units.

In 1948 Continental Air Command assumed responsibility for managing reserve and Air National Guard units from ADC. In May 1949, the Air Force reorganized its operational reserve forces into 25 wings located at 23 reserve training centers, a reduction of 18 training centers. In this reduction, the squadron was inactivated in June 1949.

=== Strategic Air Command ===
==== Medium bomber operations at Chenault Air Force Base ====
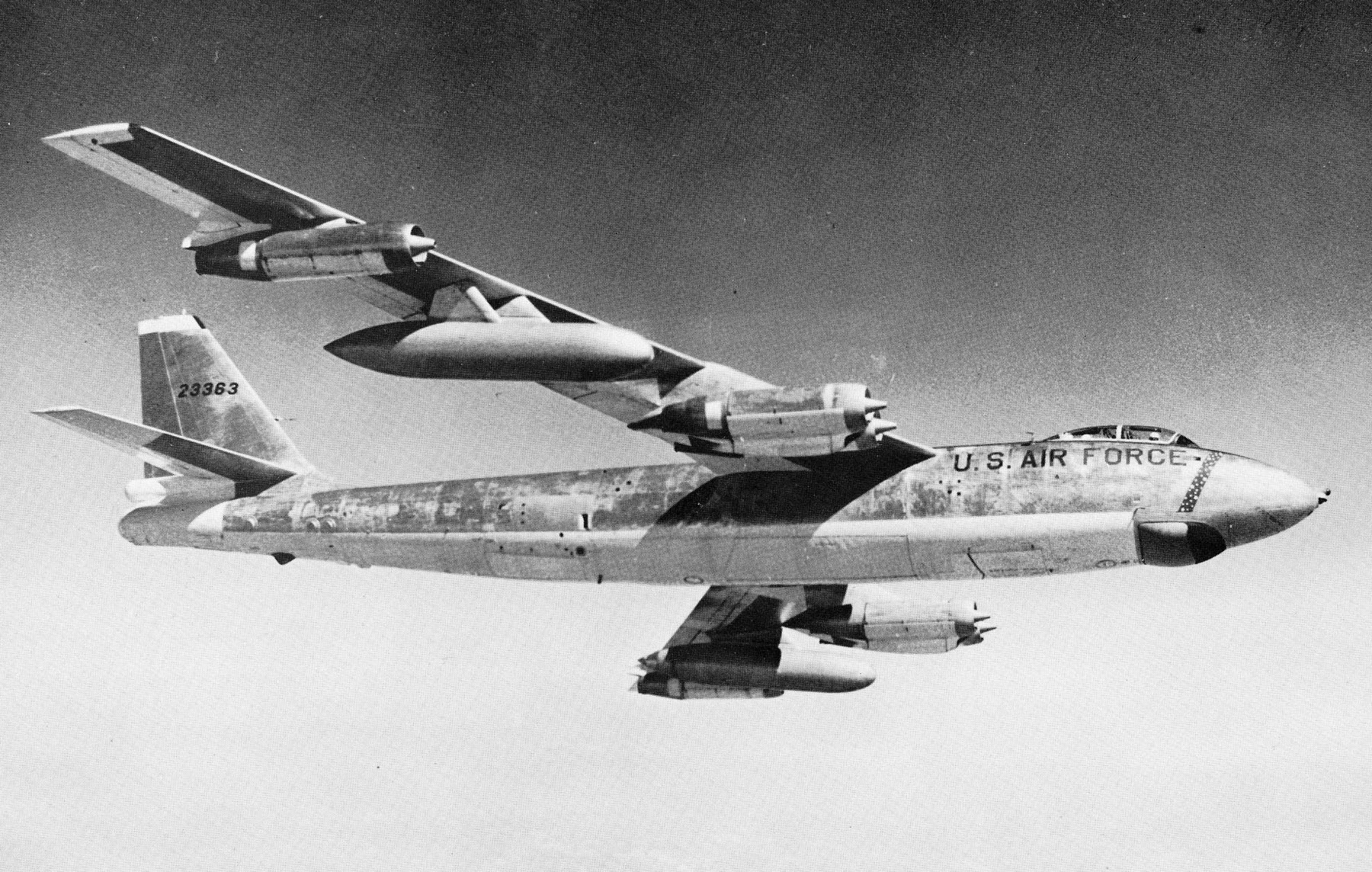
B47 Stratofortress as flown by the squadron

The squadron was redesignated the 51st Strategic Reconnaissance Squadron and activated in October 1951 at Lake Charles Air Force Base, receiving its initial cadre from the 44th Bombardment Wing. The squadron began training with Boeing B-29 Superfortresses borrowed from other units, until receiving its own B-29s in May 1952. Never having flown reconnaissance missions, it became the 51st Bombardment Squadron the following month. It operated with B-29s until late 1953 when the squadron received new Boeing B-47 Stratojet bombers. Only about half of the B-47s initially assigned to the 68th Bombardment Wing were equipped for combat. Becoming operationally ready with the B-47 in May 1954, the squadron conducted strategic bombardment training to meet Strategic Air Command (SAC)'s global commitments.

The squadron deployed its Stratojets with the 68th Wing to RAF Fairford from 14 June to 7 August 1954 and to RAF Brize Norton from 25 September 1957 to 8 January 1958. Unit deployments were replaced by Operation Reflex alert operations by October 1957. Reflex placed Stratojets on alert at bases closer to the Soviet Union for 90 day periods, although individuals rotated back to home bases during unit Reflex deployments. The 68th Wing detached crews and planes for Reflex to RAF Fairford and to Sidi Slimane Air Base, Morocco.

From 1958, the Boeing B-47 Stratojet units of SAC began to assume an alert posture at their home bases, reducing the amount of time spent on alert at overseas bases. General Thomas S. Power set an initial goal of maintaining one third of SAC's planes on fifteen minute ground alert, fully fueled and ready for combat to reduce vulnerability to a Soviet missile strike. The SAC alert commitment was increased to half the squadron's aircraft in 1962.

Soon after the detection of Soviet missiles in Cuba, SAC brought all degraded and adjusted alert sorties up to full capability. On 22 October, B-47s were dispersed. Most dispersal bases were civilian airfields with AF Reserve or Air National Guard units. B-47s were configured for execution of the Emergency War Order as soon as possible after dispersal. On 24 October SAC went to DEFCON 2, placing all the squadron's aircraft on alert. With easing tensions, on 15 November 1/6 of the squadron's dispersed B-47s were recalled to their home bases. On 21 November SAC went to DEFCON 3 and the remaining dispersed B-47s were recalled on 24 November. On 27 November SAC returned to normal alert posture. On its return to Chennault, the squadron began phasing down in preparation for the base's closure.

==== Heavy bomber operations at Seymour Johnson Air Force Base ====
On 20 March 1963, the squadron became non-operational, and on 15 Apr 1963, it moved on paper to Seymour Johnson Air Force Base, North Carolina, where it assumed the personnel, equipment and mission of the 73d Bombardment Squadron, which was simultaneously inactivated. The squadron conducted strategic bombardment training to meet SAC commitments. From 28 March to 28 August 1965, the squadron deployed to Loring Air Force Base, Maine.

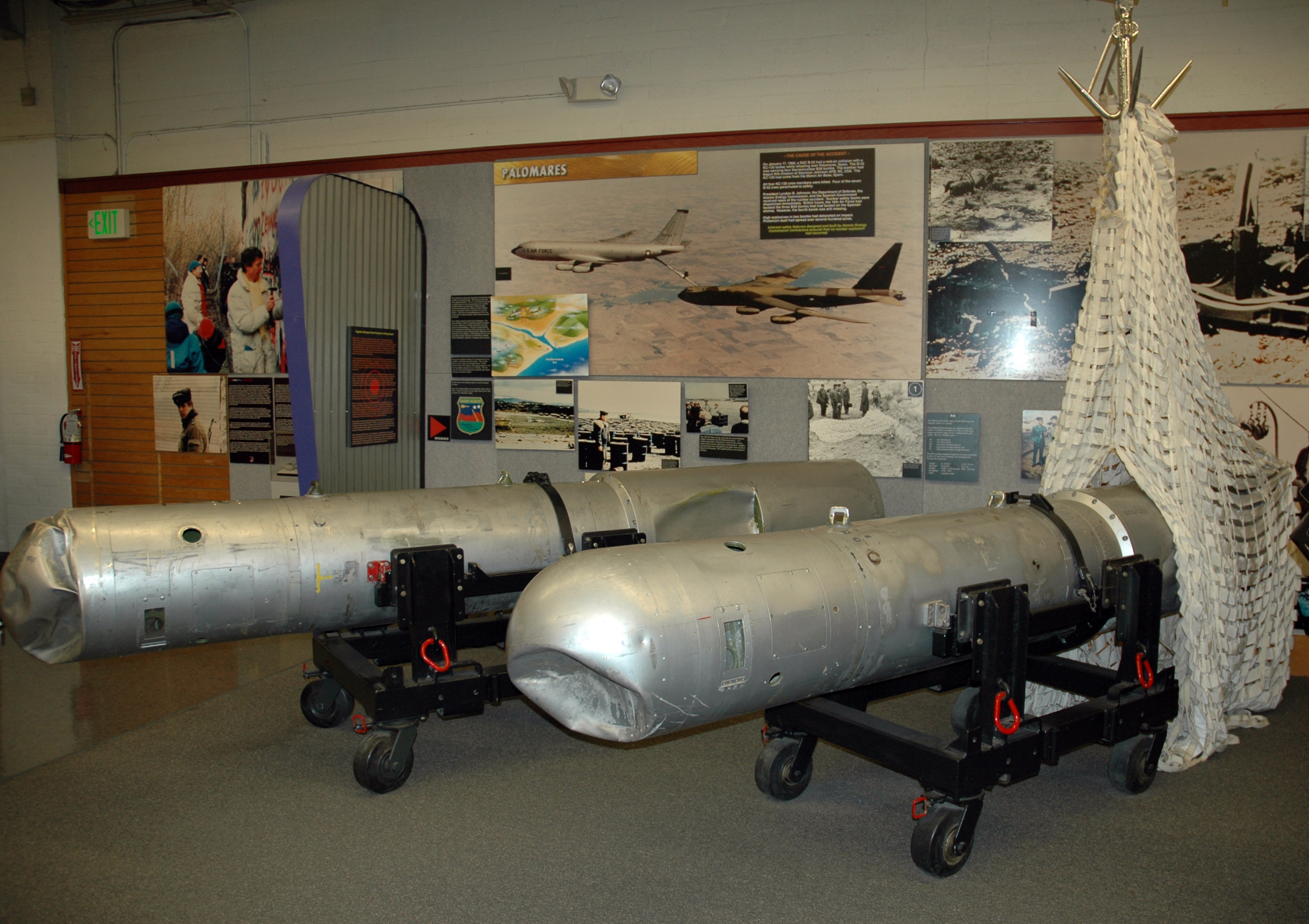
The casings of two nuclear bombs involved in the Palomares accident on display at the National Museum of Nuclear Science & History

SAC planners devised methods to protect their bomber force in addition to the ground alert program. SAC also maintained an airborne B-52 force for "airborne alert training" in Operation Chrome Dome. On 17 January 1966, a squadron B-52G armed with four Mark 28 FI nuclear bombs collided with a Boeing KC-135 Stratotanker while refueling on a Chrome Dome mission near Palomares, Spain. The conventional explosives in two bombs exploded, spreading radioactive material over two square kiometers. The accident prompted Spain to ban nuclear armed flights over its territory, and, along with the 1968 Thule Air Base B-52 crash helped terminate the Chrome Dome operation.

The squadron's aircraft and most of its aircrews were loaned to other SAC units for Operation Arc Light and Operation Linebacker II from 27 May 1972 until 15 July 1973. The squadron returned to nuclear alert after the end of the Vietnam War, with alert aircraft dispersed to Homestead Air Force Base, in addition to those at Seymour Johnson. It was inactivated in September 1982 as the 68th Bombardment Wing was replaced by the 68th Air Refueling Group.

== Lineage ==
- Constituted as the 51st Reconnaissance Squadron, Very Long Range, Weather in 1947

Activated on 1 August 1947
Inactivated on 27 June 1949
Redesignated 51st Strategic Reconnaissance Squadron, Medium, Photo
Activated on 10 October 1951
Redesignated 51st Bombardment Squadron, Medium on 16 June 1952
Redesignated 51st Bombardment Squadron, Heavy on 15 April 1963
Inactivated on 30 September 1982

=== Assignments ===
- 68th Reconnaissance Group, 1 August 1947 – 27 June 1949
- 68th Strategic Reconnaissance Group, 10 August 1951 (attached to 68th Strategic Reconnaissance Wing after 10 October 1951)
- 68th Strategic Reconnaissance Wing (later 68th Bombardment Wing), 16 June 1952 – 30 September 1982

=== Stations ===
- Hamilton Field (later Hamilton Air Force Base), California, 9 April 1947 – 27 June 1949
- Lake Charles Air Force Base (later Chennault Air Force Base), Louisiana, 10 October 1951
- Seymour Johnson Air Force Base, North Carolina, 15 April 1963 – 30 September 1982

=== Aircraft ===
- Boeing B-29 Superfortress, 1951-1952
- Boeing B-47 Stratojet, 1953–1963
- Boeing B-52 Stratofortress, 1963–1982

== See also ==
- List of B-52 Units of the United States Air Force
- List of B-47 units of the United States Air Force
- List of B-29 Superfortress operators
- List of United States Air Force weather reconnaissance squadrons
