= 52 Squadron =

52 Squadron may refer to:

- No. 52 Squadron IAF, India
- No. 52 Squadron PAF, Pakistan
- No. 52 Squadron RAF, United Kingdom
- No. 52 Squadron RNZAF, New Zealand; see list of squadrons of the RNZAF
- 52d Aero Squadron, Air Service, United States Army; see list of American aero squadrons
- 23d Pursuit Squadron, United States Army Air Corps
- VA-52 (U.S. Navy)
- VF-52, United States Navy
- VPB-52, United States Navy

== United States Air Force ==
- 52nd Airlift Squadron
- 52nd Bombardment Squadron
- 23rd Fighter Squadron
- 52d Combat Communications Squadron
- 52nd Expeditionary Flying Training Squadron
- 52d Reconnaissance Squadron
