= 1st Weather Reconnaissance Squadron =

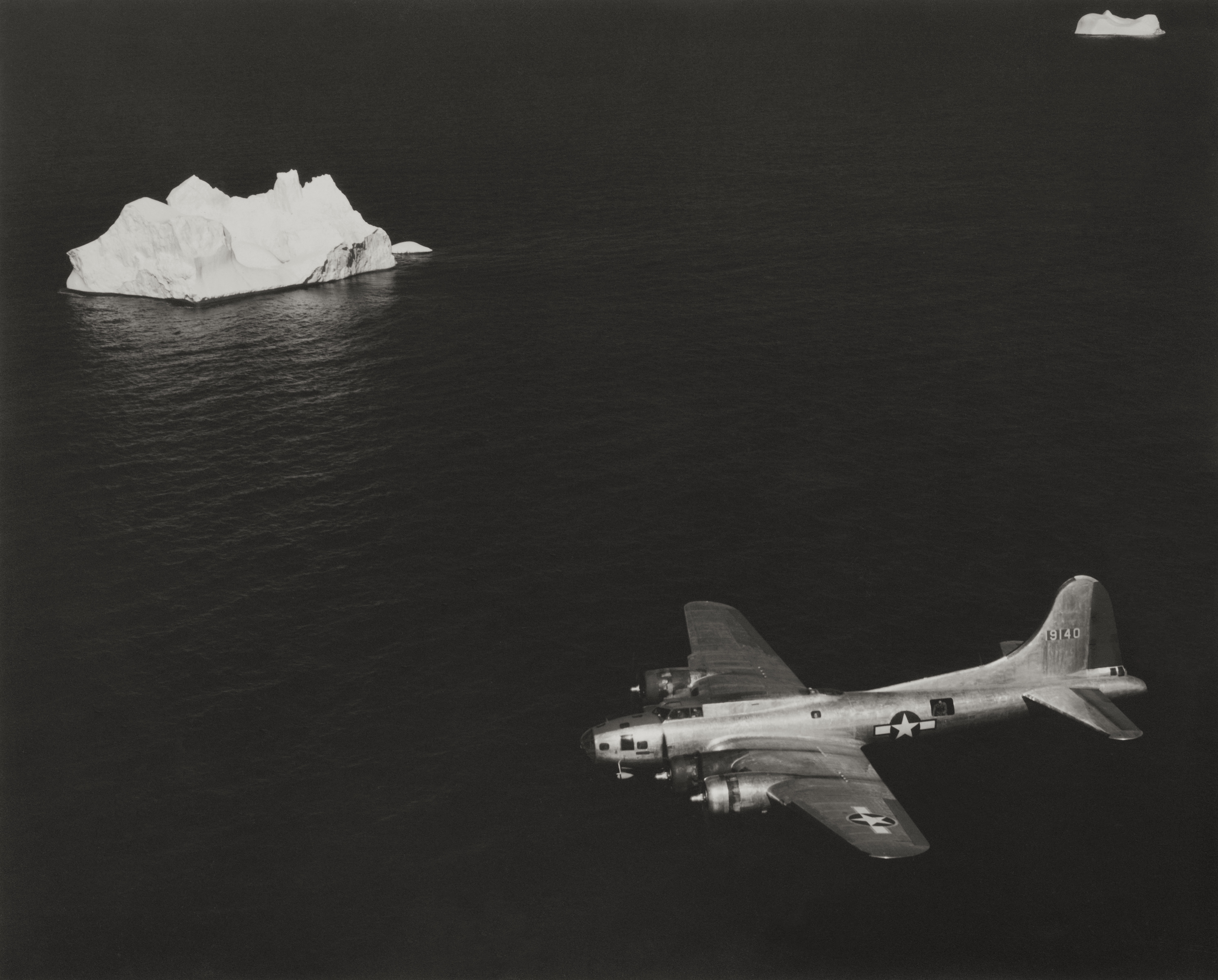
- RB-17E #41-9140. Modified B-17s like this were used over the North Atlantic by the 1st & 53d Weather Reconnaissance Squadrons.
- Active: 1942–1945
- Country: United States
- Branch: Army Air Forces
- Type: Flying Squadron
- Role: Weather Reconnaissance

Commanders
- Capt Arthur A. McCartan: 23 September 1942
- Lt Col Clark L. Hosmer: 23 June 1943
- Maj Karl T. Rauk: 14 August 1944
- Capt Sidney C. Bruce: 14 February 1945

Insignia
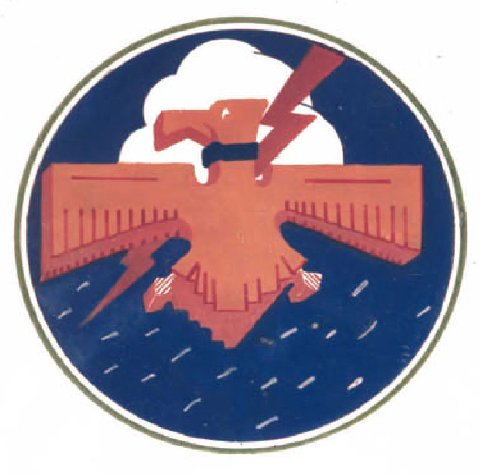
- The Thunderbird – Emblem of the Army Air Forces Weather Reconnaissance Squadron (Test) Number One and subsequent units. Approved 26 March 1943.

Aircraft flown
- Bomber: A-28 Hudson
- Reconnaissance: RB-17E Flying Fortress; RB-17F Flying Fortress; RB-17G Flying Fortress; TB-25D Mitchell; TB-25J Mitchell

The 1st Weather Reconnaissance Squadron is an inactive United States Army Air Force unit. It saw service between April 1943 and May 1945. On 21 December the squadron was inactivated at Grenier Field, New Hampshire. (Note: This unit is not related to the 1st Weather Reconnaissance Squadron (Special), which was organized by Military Air Transport Service on 1 June 1948 at Fairfield-Suisun Air Force Base, California and assigned to the 308th Reconnaissance Group, redesignated 2078th Weather Reconnaissance Squadron (Special) on 1 October 1948, moved to Tinker Air Force Base, Oklahoma on 10 November 1949, where it was discontinued on 20 March 1950. That squadron used the emblem approved for the 1st Weather Reconnaissance Squadron as well. Markus, p. 152.)

During World War II the United States had to move large numbers of aircraft to the European and Mediterranean Theaters via the North Atlantic ferry route, a series of short flights between Newfoundland, Labrador, Greenland, Iceland and the UK. Weather conditions in winter closed the route and made crossing perilous at any time. The amount of time the route was open could be increased and the losses en route decreased by accurate weather forecasting. Land based weather stations left large gaps; the solution was the development of airborne meteorology.

The 1st Weather Reconnaissance Squadron was formed to gather weather data for the North Atlantic ferry routes, particularly the segments over the ocean. This data was used to provide forecasts for the safe passage of aircraft flying between North America and Britain. It became operational in April 1943 and operated throughout the North Atlantic region.

== History ==
=== Background ===
During World War II, the United States had to move large numbers of aircraft to the European and Mediterranean Theaters. (Note: 47,649 airplanes out of 76,076 total deployed to all theaters overseas, from 1 December 1941 to 1 September 1945.) Nearly 15,000 were sent across the North Atlantic to Britain before being dispersed to their areas of operations. Even before the US entered the war, the British were buying thousands of US planes to build up the Royal Air Force and replace aircraft lost in the Battles of France and Britain. While larger, four engine planes could be flown directly, one and two engine planes did not have the necessary range. At first, these smaller planes were partially disassembled and carried across on cargo ships but that was inefficient, slow, and the ships were often attacked by German submarines. (Note: Convoys between Halifax, Nova Scotia and Liverpool, England took about two weeks. Loading and unloading took additional time, as did waiting for the convoy to form and waiting for docking at the destination.) (Note: Sixteen ships carrying airplanes recorded sunk in the North Atlantic between 22 February 1940 and 4 August 1942.)

Work started in 1940 on an alternative, the North Atlantic ferry route, a series of shorter flights across Newfoundland, Labrador, Greenland and Iceland to the UK. The necessary airfields and resources were in place by summer of 1942 for the first large scale flights by the Eighth Air Force. Large numbers of aircraft were ferried during the summer but weather conditions in the winter closed the route and made any crossing more perilous. (Note: 882 planes reached Britain over the North Atlantic route from 23 June 1942 to 1 January 1943. Most of the planes, a mix of Boeing B-17 Flying Fortresses, Lockheed P-38 Lightnings and Douglas C-47 Skytrains, were part of Operation Bolero as the Eighth Air Force relocated to Britain.)

The stormy and erratic weather in the North Atlantic region presented the same problem faced by ships sailing between North America and Britain, and required the same solution: accurate weather forecasting. With the defeat of France, and Germany's aerial attacks on Britain in midyear 1940, it was clear that the Army Air Forces' (AAF) weather services would soon be inadequate to the need. Facilities and personnel were rapidly produced to provide weather stations, weather observers and weather forecasters. (Note: By 7 December 1941, the weather services had 4,300 officers and men.)

Importantly, the AAF's weather services were fundamental for the growth of air transport services and the ferrying of aircraft. Weather stations for the North Atlantic ferry route were developed from Eastern Canada north to the Arctic Circle and east to Iceland. In addition to readings collected by land stations, data was also available from United States Coast Guard ships on weather patrol in the North Atlantic. On 13 August 1941, a detachment of weather officers and men was activated at Gander Airport, Newfoundland, to coordinate and extend the network of facilities and provide forecasts for the area. However, these facilities were still sparse considering the immense region to cover and forecasts were necessary limited. Data was unavailable for large sections of land and large stretches of the ocean where storm systems could hide. The problem was how to cover this expanse with the scarce resources at hand. The solution was the flying meteorologist.

=== Mission ===
The squadron’s mission was to gather weather data over the North Atlantic ferry routes, particularly from the segments over the ocean. This data was used to provide forecasts for the safe passage of aircraft flying between North America and Britain. There were three routes used for this. Two routes had short flights from Canada to Greenland to Iceland and to Scotland. Airplanes could also fly directly from Canada to Scotland.

=== Organization ===
Shortly before the US declared war on the Axis powers in 1941, there were discussions at AAF headquarters about organizing several weather reconnaissance squadrons. As a result, the Army Air Forces Weather Reconnaissance Squadron (Test) Number One was constituted in August 1942. It was assigned to the 2d Weather Squadron and stationed at Patterson Field in Ohio. It was tasked with finding the types of equipment, personnel, and procedures necessary for gathering and reporting weather data during flight. The results of this research were supposed to be the basis for forming operational squadrons. But the program lacked support and languished until the next spring.

In April 1943, the squadron was made operational and assigned to Flight Control Command. It moved to Truax Field in Madison, Wisconsin for training. In June, its headquarters moved to Presque Isle Army Air Field, Maine under command of Lt. Col. Clark L. Hosmer. In July, it was assigned to the recently activated Army Air Forces Weather Wing.

Hosmer was an important personality in AAF weather circles. He was a pilot, a graduate of West Point and trained in meteorology at the California Institute of Technology. In August 1941, he was assigned command of the small weather detachment at Gander Airport in Newfoundland, working alongside the Canadian weather unit until their own facilities were ready. Under Hosmer, the detachment developed weather facilities stretching across the North Atlantic Region from Canada to Iceland, and eventually became the 8th Weather Squadron. (Note: The joint American & Canadian facilities at Gander were critical for air operations in the North Atlantic region and became increasingly more important as the war continued. Gander Airport, along with the field at Goose Bay, Labrador, was the western terminus for the cargo, passenger and combat aircraft crossing the North Atlantic Route. Gander was also the operational center of a weather net stretching from the US to Britain and the largest forecast station at the western edge of the Atlantic.) When Eighth Air Force moved to Britain in 1942, he stationed his most experienced forecasters along the route. He also persuaded Eighth Air Force commanders to scout the legs of the route ahead of the fighter aircraft with B-17 bombers. As a result, the accident ratio was 5.2%, about half of what was expected. When the Army Air Forces Weather Reconnaissance Squadron (Test) Number One went operational, his knowledge of weather and advocacy of weather reconnaissance made him a natural fit as its commander. (Note: Hosmer was chief of operations of the AAF Weather Wing under Lt. Col. W.O. Senter when he was assigned.) Hosmer served for 14 months before he was reassigned to Headquarters AAF. During that time, he and 58 of his aircrew were awarded medals for their performance.

In December 1943, the squadron was redesignated the 30th Weather Reconnaissance Squadron, Air Route, Medium and assigned to Air Transport Command (ATC). ATC grew out of the Air Corps Ferrying Command that started in 1941 when America was still nominally neutral. The Ferrying Command's sole duty was flying Lend-Lease aircraft from the manufacturers on the West Coast of the US to points in Canada and the East Coast. From there the planes were sent to Britain, either by ship or flown by British pilots. Starting in 1942, the ATC became a worldwide delivery system, carrying cargo and passengers, and flying replacement aircraft, to all theatres. ATC served the material needs of all the services in the war, not just the AAF. Notably, ATC operated the North Atlantic ferry route, and the reassignment was in line with their preference for unified commands. (Note: Operational control of the 30th WRS remained with the 8th Weather Squadron.)

Hosmer was replaced by Maj. Karl T. Rauk in August 1944 and the squadron redesignated the 1st Weather Reconnaissance Squadron. In September, the squadron headquarters moved to Grenier Field near Manchester, New Hampshire.

With the failure of the last German offensive at the Battle of the Bulge in early 1945, German forces were fatally damaged and the effects were felt on the ferry routes to the European Theater. The monthly averages for aircraft arriving in Europe fell from 1551 in 1944 to 681 in 1945. With the end of the war in sight, the squadron was reorganized in February. Rauk was promoted to Lt. Col. and assigned command of the 3d Reconnaissance Squadron, Weather, Heavy(3d RS). The 3d also received the 1st Squadron's RB-17 flight and its mission. Rauk was replaced by Capt. Sidney C. Bruce and the 1st Squadron was reassigned to the 311th Photographic Wing, Mapping and Charting. By September, the squadron was operating only a single flight. The squadron was inactivated in December.

=== Equipment ===
==== Aircraft ====
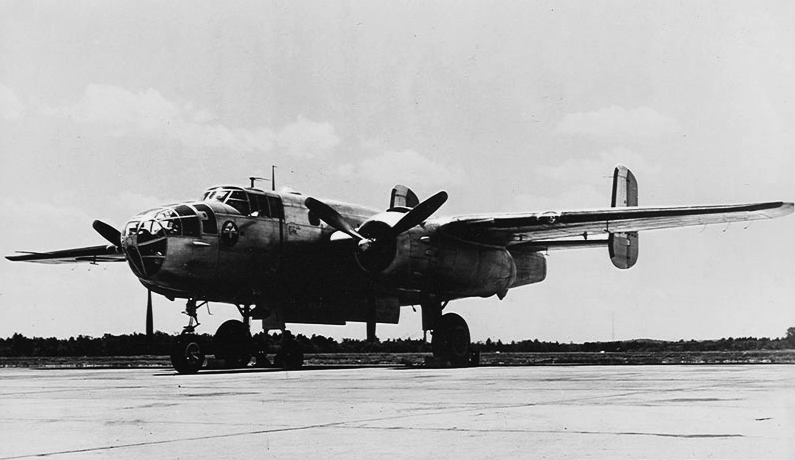
1st WRS TB-25#43-36089

When interest in the AAF Weather Reconnaissance (Test) Number One renewed in spring of 1943, it was assigned a single Lockheed Hudson. Originally, in August 1943, it was intended to equip it with six Consolidated B-24 Liberators but heavy demands for combat aircraft kept the squadron unsupplied and unattended until March 1943.The Hudson was unsuitable and would soon be unobtainable since Lockheed was stopping production. A modified version of the North American B-25 Mitchell was chosen instead. The armaments were removed, eliminating the weight from the guns, turrets, armor plating and bombsight. In their place, additional fuel tanks were installed in the bomb bay. This modification was later redesignated the TB-25D. The crew complement was pilot, co-pilot, navigator, weather officer, radio operator and flight engineer.

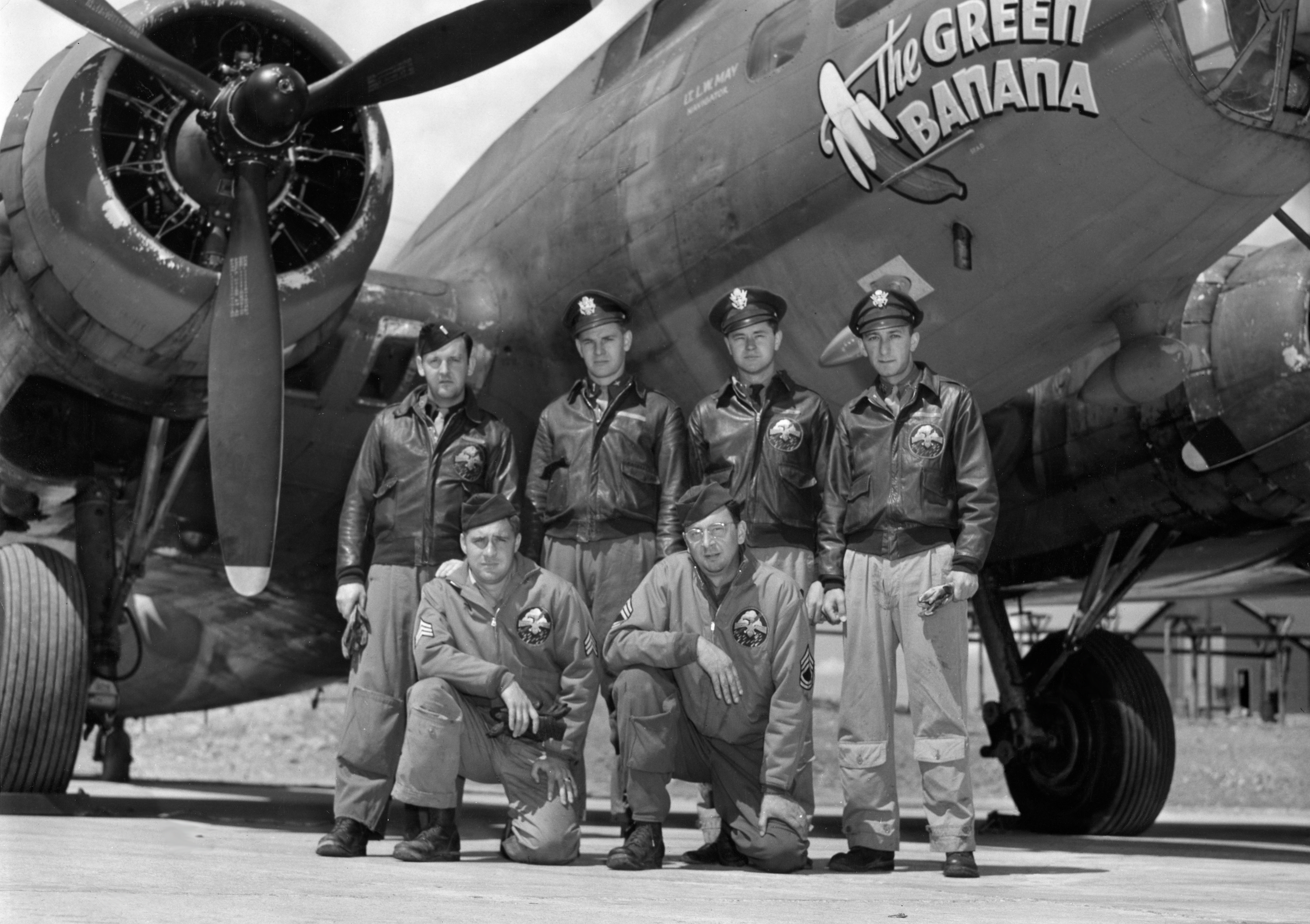
1st WRS RB-17E "The Green Banana" & Crew – 9 June 1944

The squadron received an initial nine TB-25Ds, in May 1943, and two more TB-25Ds in the next year. In August 1944, the squadron received nine B-25Js with the same modifications. The D models had a top speed of 284 mph at 15,000 feet with a range of 1,500 miles. The J models had a top speed of 272 mph at 13,000 feet with a range of 1,350 miles.

When the squadron was given three Boeing B-17Es for winter operations in 1943–1944, the crews that went to pick them up in Spokane, Washington in December, found that the airplanes had 1941 serial numbers and had already flown many hours over the Aleutians. It took weeks of maintenance before they were ready for missions in February 1944. The airplanes were stripped of armament and armor and had additional fuel tanks in the bomb bays. They were designated RB-17Es, with a crew complement of pilot, co-pilot, navigator, weather officer, radio operator and flight engineer. Over the next year, the squadron received two additional airplanes, an RB-17F and an RB-17G. The RB-17Fs and RB-17Gs and their crews were on detached service from Air Transport Command; only the weather officers were members of the squadron.

==== Instruments ====
The TB-25s were outfitted with: ML-313/AM psychrometer, ML-175-T-1 psychrometer, Friez Aerograph, SCR-718A radio altimeter, Kollsman pressure altimeter, C-13A free air thermometer, cloud height meter.

The RB-17s were outfitted with: ML-313/AM psychrometer, Friez or Pioneer Aerograph ML-715, SCR-518 or SCR-718 Radio Altimeter, K-20 camera for cloud photography, cloud height meter, weather observer's table, de-icing equipment.

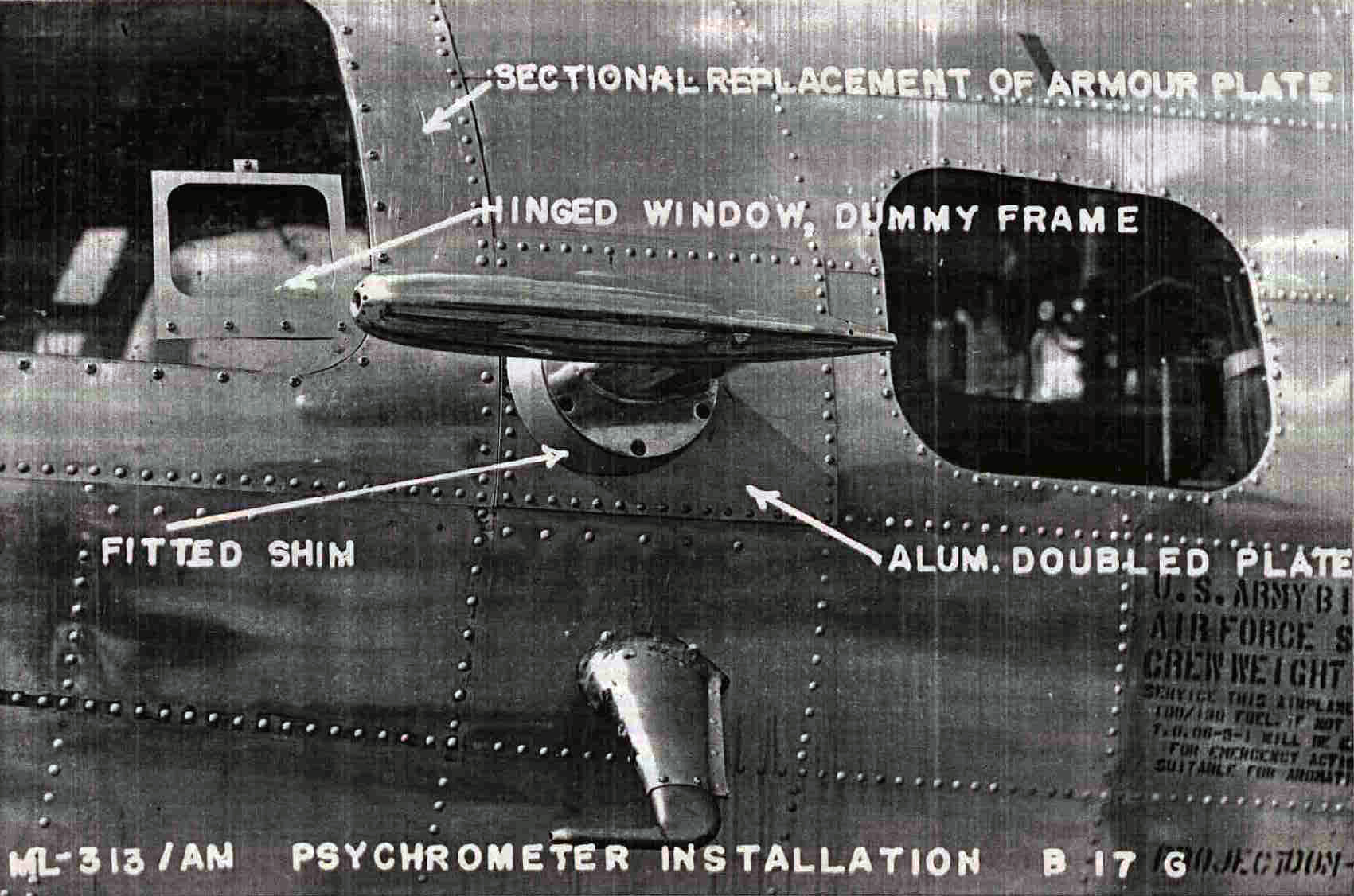
1st WRS RB-17G Weather Instruments

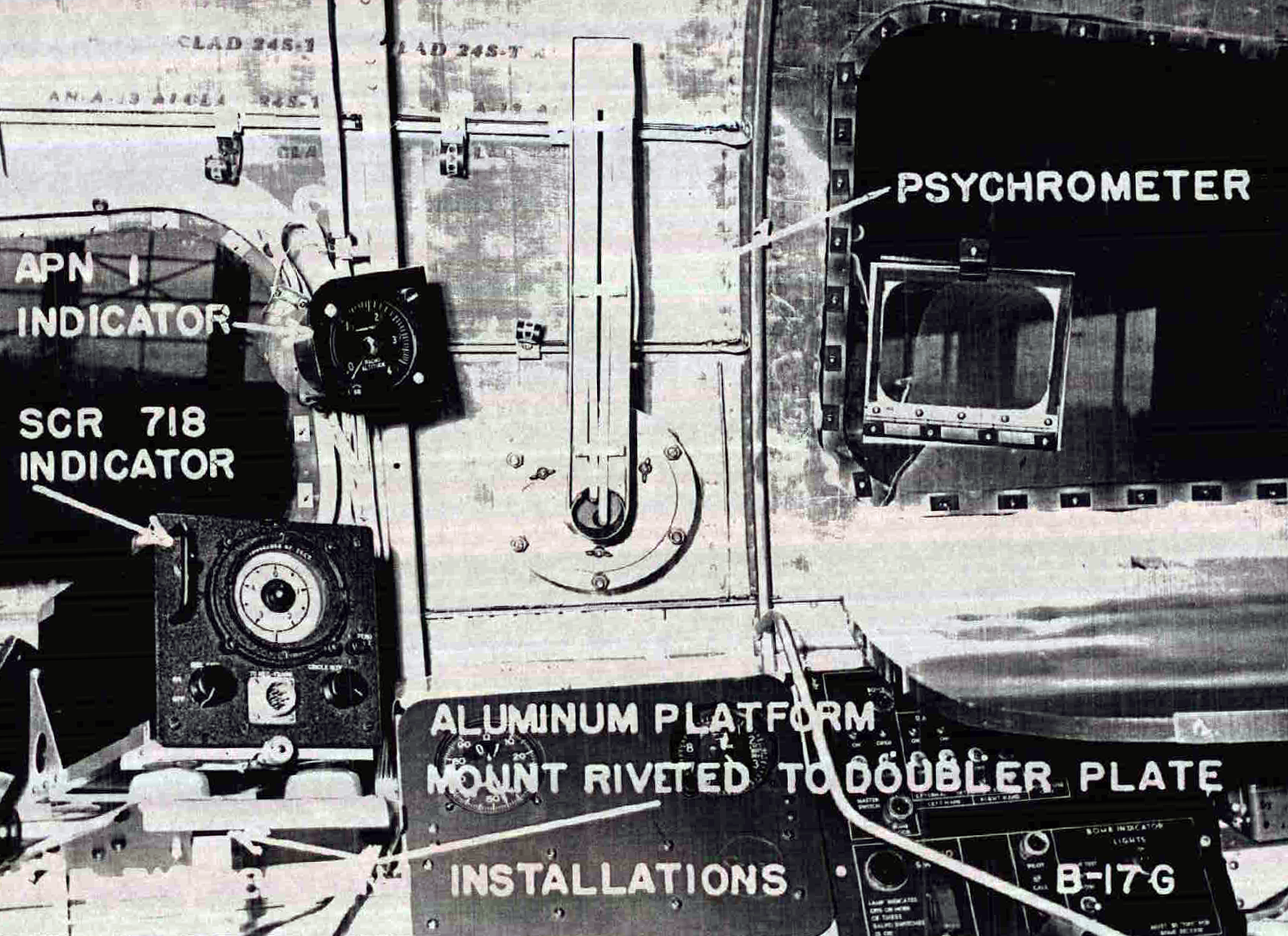
1st WRS RB-17G Weather Instruments

The psychrometers were a wet bulb-dry bulb pair of thermometers. The moisture evaporating from the wet fabric on one bulb cooled it, the lower the humidity the lower the temperature. By comparing the two temperatures, it was possible to calculate the relative humidity. The thermometers were inside the nose of the airplane. Air was trapped by probes attached to the outside and directed in over the thermometer bulbs. When the psychrometer was first tried in the airplanes, the readings were inaccurate. It was found that when exposed to an airstream moving over 200 mph, the friction of the air heated the thermometers. The amount of heating was unpredictable, making it impossible to calculate a correction. New psychrometers were developed that slowed the air before making the readings. With these devices, accuracy was 98–99%.

The aerograph combined three instruments, an air pressure sensor, a humidity sensor and a temperature sensor. The sensors were connected to pens that drew graphs on a paper chart wrapped around a rotating drum. The paper chart was replaced with a new one when it was full. When all the charts from a mission were collected in the mission log, they provided a continuous record of conditions of the flight. The air pressure sensor was an aneroid barometer and the humidity sensor was strands of human hair. As the hair absorbed or evaporated moisture, it lengthened or shortened, moving the pen.

The radio altimeter gave a true reading of the airplane's altitude when it was over the sea. Over land, the radio altimeter only gave the altitude over the land below. Without knowing the elevation of the land, it wasn't possible to know the true altitude. The pressure altimeter gave the same readings over land or sea, but it could not distinguish between a change in air pressure caused by a change in altitude and a change in air pressure caused by a change in barometric pressure. Therefore, the pressure altimeter was only accurate to a range of altitudes. By using both altimeters together over the ocean, it was possible to determine the true altitude, the true air pressure at that altitude and the pressure at other altitudes at that point.

On some RB-17E missions, there was also a bucket in the event the weather officer got airsick.

=== Observations ===
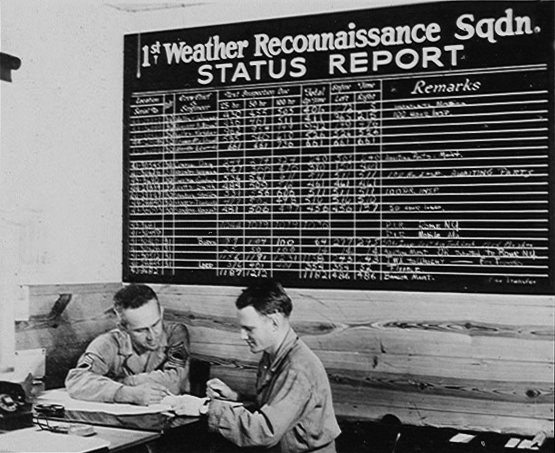
1st WRS Mission Briefing

All the effort of the officers and men of the squadron had one goal, to place the necessary instruments and a trained observer in the air at the right place and time. The success of any mission depended on the reliability of the readings they made. The instruments used were typically what any weather observer would have used at the time, modified where needed to adapt to the special circumstances of flight. In particular, they were designed to give readings from the air outside the airplane, not inside.

In all types of aircraft used, the weather officer sat in the nose where the bombardier would be in a combat airplane. The glazing gave good views of the sky, and, when flying at low, the sea. The weather officer's task was to observe and record both the visible conditions outside the airplane and the indications on the instruments. The psychrometer and aerograph indicated the relative humidity. The free air thermometer and aerograph gave the air temperature. The radio altimeter gave the altitude, and the pressure altimeter and aerograph gave the air pressure. By using both altimeters, the weather officer determined and recorded the air pressure at standard altitudes, such as 5,000 and 10,000 feet. Wind speed and direction were determined from the aircraft's drift off course. By watching for sharp changes in temperature and humidity on the aerograph chart, the weather officer noted the strength and locations of cold fronts. By having the airplane fly along a constant pressure altitude, the weather officer could map an isobaric surface.

Looking outside, he observed the height, amount and type of clouds and could photograph significant formations. He could also observe the amount and duration of any icing. At low altitudes, he could estimate the wind speed and direction if its effect on the ocean's surface was strong enough. All these observations were logged and periodically radioed to the weather reporting network. At the end of the mission, the weather officer submitted his log to the 8th Weather Squadron forecasters for analysis.

=== Operations ===
While the squadron's headquarters were in the northeastern US, it operated throughout the North Atlantic region. It had headquarters first at Presque Isle, Maine, and then Grenier Field in New Hampshire. Reconnaissance flights were staged out of: Gander Airport, Newfoundland; Goose Bay, Labrador; Bluie West 1, Greenland; Meeks Field, Iceland; Stornoway in the Hebrides, Scotland; Kindley Field; Bermuda; Lajes Field, Azores; Atkinson Field, British Guiana; Morrison Field, Florida; Borinquen Field, Puerto Rico; Waller Field, Trinidad; and Belem Airport, Brazil. During its 31 months of operations, it performed four different missions; area synoptic reconnaissance, route reconnaissance, vertical soundings and hurricane reconnaissance.

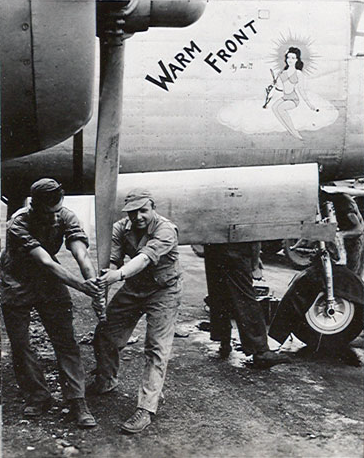
1st WRS TB-25 Maintenance

The first missions in 1943 were route reconnaissance flown by TB-25Ds. The planes scouted ahead of a planned flight of aircraft across a short hop route, reporting the weather along the way by Morse code. At the end of the reconnaissance the weather officer also sent a report describing the types of aircraft that could cross safely. Because weather reports were vital information that the Germans could intercept, they were encrypted before they were sent.

Under Clark Hosmer the squadron's initial nine TB-25Ds were divided into three flights of three airplanes. Each flight was assigned one leg of the route. The first leg was between Labrador and Greenland, a second between Greenland and Iceland, and a third between Iceland and Scotland. Each were 700 to 800 miles. In the first six months of Hosmer's command, the squadron flew 446 missions and no planes were lost to weather on flights scouted by the squadron. This achievement earned medals for the commander and his crews.

By December the North Atlantic weather was too dangerous for twin engine B-25s to fly in safely and six planes were sent to the 9th Weather Region to fly reconnaissance for the South Atlantic ferry route. Two airplanes each went to: Morrison Field, Flight C; Trinidad, Flight D; and Brazil, Flight E. Their missions were primarily route reconnaissance at first, shifting to more synoptic missions towards the end of their assignments. They returned north in May 1944.

Route reconnaissance was very good for short term forecasts over one route, but wasn’t very efficient, so early in 1944 the squadron began emphasizing synoptic area reconnaissance. Since weather moves from west to east over the North Atlantic, it was possible to make useful forecasts for all the routes by taking readings over a large area from Newfoundland and Labrador to Greenland.

In December 1943, the squadron received a flight of three B-17s on detached service from ATC. These heavier aircraft with four engines were better able to handle the rough winter weather. When they started flying in February 1944, they flew a synoptic track out and back from either Goose Bay or Gander Field. This was at first designated Flight B, later as Falcon Flight. On a typical mission, the airplane started at 0730GMT from Gander and flew a round trip of 1400 nautical miles. On the outbound segment, the airplane flew 700 nautical miles at 10,000 feet and returned inbound at 500 feet. During the flight, the weather officer periodically recorded the altitude, temperature, air pressure, relative humidity and the wind speed and direction. He also recorded the amount and duration of any icing, the strength and location of any cold fronts and the amount, type and height of any clouds. The readings were reported every 100 miles by radio. These missions continued until February 1945. Meanwhile, the three B-25s that were left behind at Presque Isle in December 1943 were organized into Flight A and flew a few missions that winter between Presque Isle, Goose Bay and Gander Field.

In March 1944, the squadron instituted a synoptic flight, named Eagle, from Lajes Field in the Azores. Two B-25s flew a daily 1200-mile track. In May, Eagle Flight assisted the Navy moving six blimps from Massachusetts to French Morocco. Eagle Flight continued until August 1945.

In May 1944, the B-25s returned from the 9th Weather Region and resumed reconnaissance in the North Atlantic. Three new routes were set, named Redbird, Bluebird and Blackbird: Redbird initially between Goose Bay and BW1 then between Goose Bay and Presque Isle; Bluebird between Bluie West 1 and Meeks Field; Blackbird between Meeks Field and Stornoway. Most of the missions were route reconnaissance but shifted towards more synoptic missions through the summer. Starting in July, there was an additional out and back synoptic track named Raven flown south of Iceland from Meeks Field.

In the winter, the squadron again sent three flights of airplanes south, to Lajes Field, Kindley Field in Bermuda, and Atkinson Field, British Guiana. Eagle Flight at Lajes got an additional four to six planes, depending on the month. The operations out of Kindley were named Robin Flight. Eagle and Robin Flights continued until they were inactivated in August 1945. The operations out of Atkinson were named Duck Flight.

In May 1945, Duck flight moved to Morrison Field, Florida, where it replaced the Hurricane Reconnaissance Unit that had flown for the 1944 hurricane season. Duck Flight flew routine reconnaissance throughout the summer, looking for hurricanes to the east, and south to Antigua, BVI. On 12 September, they found one of the most violent ones ever recorded, Kappler's Hurricane.

The developing hurricane was spotted by weather officer 2nd Lt. Bernard J. Kappler while on a routine mission. With little difficulty, Kappler's B-25 flew through the storm that was already close to hurricane strength. They flew on to Antigua for the night with orders to return to the storm in the morning. The next day was more troublesome. Kappler's airplane encountered winds up to 120 knots, severe turbulence and heavy rain before penetrating the eye. The storm was estimated at 200 miles across. Damage on the ground was extensive but no air crew were lost. Automated recordings made as the storm passed over Morrison Field showed the highest sustained wind at 170 mph with a gust to 198 mph.

In the period June through November 1945, Duck Flight flew into six tropical storms, two hurricanes and completed 258 synoptic missions for a total of 1145 hours of operation. Duck Flight moved back to Grenier Field that December and was inactivated. (Note: Elements of the 53d Reconnaissance Squadron, Very Long Range, Weather took over hurricane reconnaissance the next season.) On 21 December, the 1st Weather Reconnaissance Squadron, Air Route, Medium, was inactivated at Grenier Field, New Hampshire.

== Squadron specifications ==
=== Lineage ===
- 16 August 1942: Constituted as the Army Air Forces Weather Reconnaissance Squadron (Test) Number 1.
- 21 December 1943: Redesignated as the 30th Weather Reconnaissance Squadron, Air Route, Medium.
- 5 August 1944: Redesignated as the 1st Weather Reconnaissance Squadron, Air Route, Medium.

=== Assignments ===
- 21 August 1942: Activated and assigned to Headquarters Army Air Forces Directorate of Weather, which further assigned it to 2d Weather Squadron (Regional Control).
- 13 April 1943: Assigned to Flight Control Command.
- 6 July 1943: Assigned to Army Air Forces Weather Wing.
- 21 Dec 1943: Assigned to Air Transport Command (ATC).
- 9 February 1945: Assigned to 311th Photographic Wing, Mapping and Charting.
- 21 Dec 1945: Inactivated.

=== Stations ===
- 21 August 1942: Patterson Field, Ohio.
- 13 April 1943: Truax AAF, Madison Wisconsin.
- 23 June 1943: Presque Isle, Maine.
- 5 September 1944: Grenier Field, New Hampshire.

=== Aircraft ===
- A-28 Hudson
- RB-17E Flying Fortress
- RB-17F Flying Fortress
- RB-17G Flying Fortress
- TB-25D Mitchell
- TB-25J Mitchell

=== Awards ===
- Service Streamer, American Theater, World War II, 7 December 1941 – 2 March 1946.

=== Insignia ===
The figure on the patch is a thunderbird. In some native American cultures, thunderbirds control the weather. A thunderbird throws lightning and creates thunder as it flaps its wings. The background of the patch is blue for the sky. On the sky are clouds, rain drops and a lightning bolt.

== See also ==
- List of United States Air Force weather reconnaissance squadrons
