= 42nd Air Division =

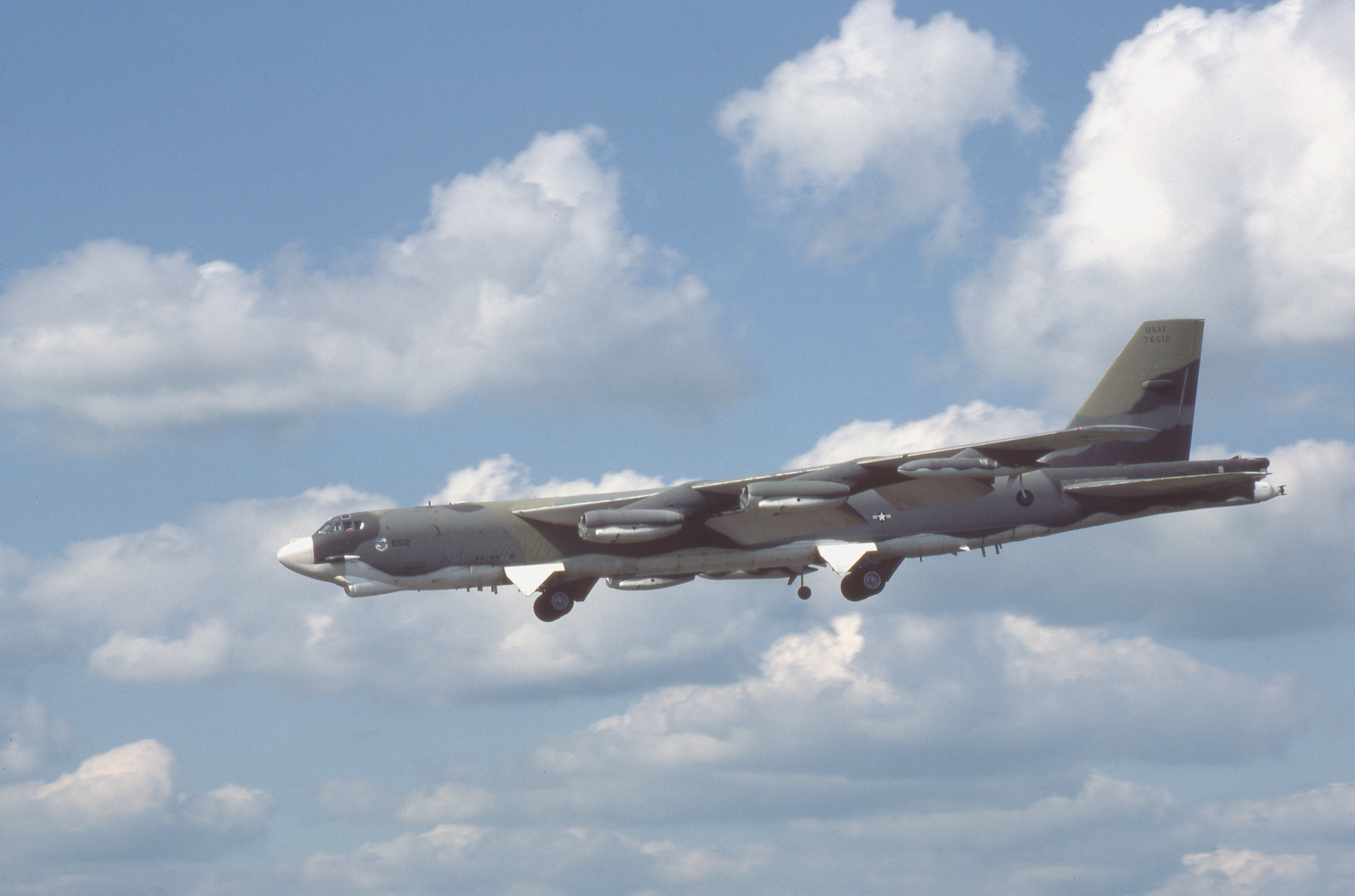
- B-52G as flown by division wings in the 1980s
- Active: 1943–1945; 1951–1958; 1959–1969; 1970–1991
- Country: United States
- Branch: United States Air Force
- Role: Command of strike forces
- Decorations: French Croix de Guerre with Palm

Insignia
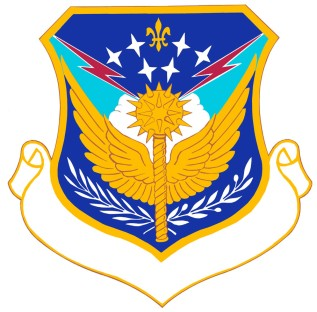
- 42nd Air Division emblem (Note: Approved 29 December 1965. Description: Per chevron inverted azure and light blue between in chief a fleur de lis or enarched with four mullets of four points above two of same argent, all between two lightning bolts gules fimbriated of the fourth [color] and in base saltirewise a palm and an olive branch of the last [color], in fess point a cloud formation of the like [color] and over all in pale a winged mace displayed or, all within a diminished border of the last [color].)

The 42nd Air Division was a unit of the United States Air Force. It was established as the 42 Bombardment Wing (Dive) on 8 February 1943. The wing first saw combat in September 1943. It was inactivated in 1991.

== History ==
Activated in 1943 as the 42nd Bombardment Wing and controlled Martin B-26 Marauder groups as part of Twelfth Air Force. "The wing first saw combat in the invasion of Italy, where its units flew close support missions to stop the German counterattack on the beachhead at Salerno during September 1943. As the Allied forces progressed, the 42nd took a leading part in interdicting Axis road and rail transport, and later in 1944, in the attacks against the monastery at Cassino. In August 1944, it supported the Allied landings in southern France. As the war drew to a close the 42nd attacked German positions along the Siegfried Line and, in support of the Allied forces in their sweep across southern Germany, bombed enemy strong points, and communications and supply facilities."

The French Bretagne Bombardment Group was attached in 1943.

Reactivated an intermediate command echelon of Strategic Air Command in March 1951, the 42nd Air Division "equipped and trained its assigned units to conduct strategic air warfare using nuclear or conventional weapons anywhere in the world. It also trained and maintained air refueling assets. Tankers from units assigned to the 42nd supported the Eielson Tanker Task Force and, over the years, occasionally deployed to Spain for Spanish Area Support. The division conducted numerous staff assistance visits and simulated no notice inspections, and participated in exercises such as Buy None and Global Shield."

Aircraft and personnel from units assigned to the division, at various times in the late 1960s and early 1970s, deployed to Southeast Asia and took part in Operation Arc Light and Operation Young Tiger missions. Subordinate units of the 42nd deployed aircraft and personnel in support of the Vietnam War.

The division was inactivated in 1991 as part of the post-Cold War reduction of USAF forces.

== Lineage ==
- Established as the 42nd Bombardment Wing (Dive) on 8 February 1943

Activated on 16 February 1943
Redesignated 42nd Bombardment Wing (Medium) on 31 July 1943
Redesignated 42nd Bombardment Wing, Medium on 23 October 1944
Inactivated on 25 October 1945

- Redesignated 42nd Air Division on 2 March 1951

Organized on 10 March 1951
Discontinued on 16 June 1952

- Activated on 16 June 1952

Inactivated on 8 January 1958

- Activated on 15 July 1959.

Redesignated 42nd Strategic Aerospace Division on 1 June 1962
Redesignated 42nd Air Division on 1 July 1963
Inactivated on 2 July 1969
Activated on 1 January 1970
Inactivated on 9 July 1991

=== Assignments ===
- Third Air Force, 16 February 1943
- Twelfth Air Force, 31 July 1943
- Northwest African Strategic Air Force, 21 August 1943
- XII Bomber Command, 1 September 1943
- Fifteenth Air Force 1 November 1943
- Twelfth Air Force, 1 January 1944
- XII Tactical Air Command, 27 November 1944
- First Tactical Air Force (Provisional), 6 January 1945
- XII Tactical Air Command, 21 May 1945
- United States Air Forces in Europe, 26 July 1945
- Army Service Forces (for inactivation), 13 25 October 1945
- Eighth Air Force, 10 March 1951 – 16 June 1952; 16 June 1952
- Second Air Force, 1 April 1955
- Ninth Air Force, 1 July 1957
- Eighteenth Air Force, 1 October 1957
- Twelfth Air Force, 1–8 January 1958
- Second Air Force, 15 July 1959 – 2 July 1969
- Second Air Force, 1 January 1970
- Eighth Air Force, 1 January 1975 – 9 July 1991

=== Components ===
Wings

- 2nd Bombardment Wing: 1 July 1965 – 2 July 1969; 1 December 1982 – 16 June 1988
- 12th Fighter-Escort Wing (later 12 Strategic Fighter Wing, 12 Fighter-Day Wing): 9 April 1951 – 16 June 1952 (detached 20 July – 20 November 1951). 16 June 1952 – 8 January 1958 (detached 18 May – 10 August 1953 and 10 May – 7 August 1954)
- 17th Bombardment Wing: 1 July 1973 – 30 September 1975
- 19th Bombardment Wing (later 19 Air Refueling Wing): 30 June 1971 – 16 June 1988
- 27th Fighter-Escort Wing (later 27 Strategic Fighter wing, 27 Fighter Bomber Wing): 6 August 1951 – 16 June 1952. 16 June 1952 – 8 January 1958 (detached 6 October 1952 – 13 February 1953 and 7 May – 17 August 1955)
- 43rd Bombardment Wing: 1–31 January 1970
- 68th Bombardment Wing: 30 June 1971 – 30 September 1982
- 97th Bombardment Wing: 1 July 1963 – 2 July 1969. 1 January 1970 – 30 June 1971; 1 July 1973 – 16 June 1988
- 131st Fighter-Bomber Wing: c. 10 March – c. 31 July 1951
- 301st Air Refueling Wing: 31 March 1970 – 1 July 1973; 1 July 1975 – 30 September 1979
- 305th Air Refueling Wing: 1 January 1970 – 1 July 1973; 1 December 1982 – 16 July 1988
- 306th Bombardment Wing: 30 June 1971 – 1 July 1974
- 308th Strategic Missile Wing: 1 January – 31 March 1970; 1 April 1973 – 1 December 1982
- 319th Bombardment Wing: 16 June 1988 – 9 July 1991
- 321st Strategic Missile Wing: 16 June 1988 – 9 July 1991
- 381st Strategic Missile Wing: 1 March 1962 – 1 July 1963
- 454th Bombardment Wing: 1 July 1963 – 2 July 1969
- 4347th Combat Crew Training Wing: 15 July 1959 – 15 June 1963
- 4397th Air Refueling Wing: 15 July 1959 – 15 June 1962

Groups

- 1st Fighter Group: 24 August – 15 December 1953
- 17th Bombardment Group: 24 August 1943 – 29 May 1945
- 31 Bombardment (French Air Force): attached 6 January – c. 1 May 1945
- 34 Bombardment (French Air Force): attached 6 January – c. 1 May 1945
- 68th Air Refueling Group: 30 September 1982 – 16 June 1988
- 319th Bombardment Group: 24 August 1943 – 10 November 1944
- 320th Bombardment Group: 24 August 1943 – 29 May 1945
- 325th Fighter Group: 24 August – 22 October 1943

Squadrons

- 307th Air Refueling Squadron, 1 July 1953 – 18 November 1953

=== Stations ===
- Birmingham Army Air Field, Alabama, 22 February – 31 July 1943

Deployed at Anniston Army Airfield, Alabama, 16–30 June 1943

- Ariana Airfield, Tunisia, 21 August 1943
- Elmas Airfield, Sardinia, 15 November 1943
- Borgo Airfield, Corsica, 21 September 1944
- Dijon-Longvic Airfield (Y-9), France, 24 November 1944
- Camp Shanks, New York, 24–25 October 1945
- Bergstrom Air Force Base, Texas, 10 March 1951 – 8 January 1958
- McConnell Air Force Base, Kansas, 15 July 1959
- Blytheville Air Force Base, Arkansas, 1 July 1963 – 2 July 1969
- Blytheville Air Force Base, Arkansas, 1 January 1970
- McCoy Air Force Base, Florida, 30 June 1971
- Blytheville Air Force Base (later Eaker Air Force Base), Arkansas, 1 September 1973
- Grand Forks Air Force Base, North Dakota, 16 June 1988 – 9 July 1991

=== Aircraft and missiles ===
Curtiss P-40 Warhawk, 1940 Martin B-26 Marauder, 1943–1945 Lockheed P-38 Lightning, 1943

Convair B-36 Peacemaker, 1951–1957 Republic F-84 Thunderjet, 1951–1958 Boeing KB-29 Superfortress, 1953–1957 McDonnell F-101 Voodoo, 1957–1958 Boeing KC-97 Stratofreighter, 1957–1958

Boeing B-52 Stratofortress, 1963–1969 Boeing KC-135 Stratotanker, 1963–1969 LGM-25C Titan II, 1963–1969 Boeing EC-135, 1966–1969

Boeing B-52 Stratofortress, 1970, 1973–1988 Boeing KC-135 Stratotanker, 1972–1988 LGM-25C Titan II, 1970, 1973–1982 Boeing EC-135, 1970–1973, 1982–1988 McDonnell Douglas KC-10 Extender, 1982–1988 Rockwell B-1 Lancer, 1988–1991 Minuteman-III (LGM-30G), 1988–1991

=== Decorations ===
This unit earned the following unit decorations:

- French Croix de Guerre with Palm, April 1944 – June 1944

== See also ==
- List of United States Air Force air divisions
