= 73rd Bombardment Squadron =

73d Bombardment Squadron
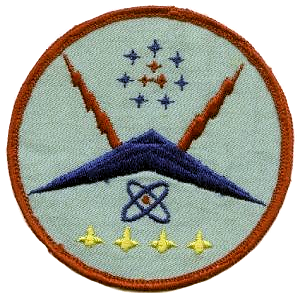
- Emblem of the 73d Bombardment Squadron
- Active: 1941–1963
- Country: United States
- Branch: United States Air Force
- Role: Bombardment

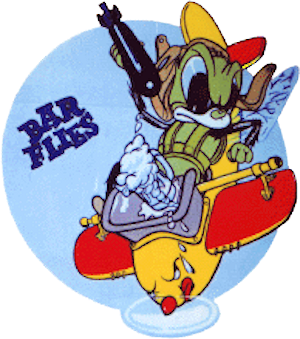
Emblem of the World War II 73d Fighter Squadron

See 73d Bombardment Squadron (World War II) for the United States Army Air Forces World War II squadron

The 73d Bombardment Squadron is an inactive United States Air Force unit. It was last assigned to the 4241st Strategic Wing, based at Seymour Johnson Air Force Base, North Carolina. It was inactivated on 15 April 1963.

== History ==
Established in late 1941 as a pursuit squadron in the Hawaii Territory, initially equipped with obsolete P-26 Peashooters, later with some early model Curtiss P-40C Warhawks. Most aircraft were destroyed on the ground at Wheeler Field during the Pearl Harbor Attack; squadron was reassigned to Bellows Field for re-equipping, being re-formed by May 1942 and redesignated as a Fighter Squadron assigned to the new Seventh Air Force. Deployed to Midway Island after the Battle of Midway as a defensive squadron, providing air defense of the island. Reassigned back to Hawaii at the beginning of 1943, remained part of the Territory's air defense forces.

Received P-47D Thunderbolts in late 1943; deployed to Saipan in the Northern Mariana Islands. During the Marianas Campaign, worked closely with Marine ground forces, pioneered close infantry support and employed the first use of napalm. On Saipan the squadron was attacked by Japanese ground forces in June 1944 on Aslito Airfield soon renamed Isley Field, Saipan, sustaining modest casualties. Pilots and ground personnel took a crash course in infantry tactics afterward. Received the new long range P-47Ns in early 1945, before moving next door to Okinawa on Ie Shima.

With the P-47N the squadron pioneered Very Long Range (VLR) fighter operations across the Pacific with missions of historic length and duration: Kauai to Midway Atoll, Midway to Kaneohe and Makin to Jaluit and Maloelap. By 1945, with the long range P-47Ns, VLR sorties were the rule rather than the exception. In April 1945 the squadron began flying 1300 mile escorts and sweeps from Iwo Jima to Honshu. In May 1945 the 73d advanced to le Shima where they reached out to Japanese targets in Kyu-shu and China.

During the summer of 1945 was reassigned to the Twentieth Air Force and continued its fighter sweeps against Japanese airfields and other targets, in addition to flying long-range B-29 escort missions to Japanese cities, until the end of the war. Assigned to Eighth Air Force on Okinawa in August 1945, shortly after V-J Day. Returned to the United States and inactivated in Jan 1946.

Activated in the postwar air force reserve, but never manned or equipped. Inactivated due to budget shortages in 1949.

Reactivated in 1952 as a Strategic Air Command RB-36 Peacemaker strategic reconnaissance squadron at Ramey AFB, Puerto Rico; flew very long range intelligence gathering missions over the borders of the Soviet Union, North Korea and Communist China until 1959 when the B-36 was retired. In 1959 was reassigned to SAC provisional 4241st Strategic Wing, being re-equipped with B-52G Stratofortress intercontinental heavy bombers. Was reassigned to Seymour Johnson AFB, North Carolina by SAC to disperse its heavy bomber force. Conducted worldwide strategic bombardment training missions and providing nuclear deterrent.

Was inactivated in 1963 when SAC inactivated its provisional Strategic Wings, redesignating them permanent Air Force Wings. Squadron was inactivated with aircraft/personnel/equipment being redesignated 51st Bombardment Squadron in an in-place, name-only transfer.

== Lineage ==
- Constituted 73d Pursuit Squadron (Interceptor) on 4 October 1941

Activated on 5 October 1941
Redesignated 73d Fighter Squadron on 15 May 1942
Inactivated on 12 January 1946

- Activated in the reserve on 1 August 1947

Inactivated on 27 June 1949

- Redesignated 73d Strategic Reconnaissance Squadron (Heavy) on 4 June 1952

Activated on 16 June 1952
Redesignated 73d Bombardment Squadron (Heavy) on 1 October 1955.
Discontinued, and inactivated on 15 April 1963; personnel/aircraft/equipment redesignated as 51st Bombardment Squadron

== Assignments ==
- 18th Pursuit (later Fighter) Group, 5 October 1941
- 318th Fighter Group, 15 October 1942 – 12 January 1946
- 72d Reconnaissance Group, 1 August 1947 – 27 June 1949
- 72d Strategic Reconnaissance (later Bombardment) Wing, 16 June 1952
- 4241st Strategic Wing, 5 January 1959 – 15 April 1963

=== Stations ===
- Wheeler Field, Hawaii Territory, 5 October 1941
- Bellows Field, Hawaii Territory, 22 May 1942
- Henderson Field, Midway Eastern Island, 17 June 1942
- Kaneohe Field, Hawaii Territory, 26 January 1943
- Mokuleia Field, Hawaii Territory, 5 May 1943
- Bellows Field, Hawaii Territory, 8 November 1943
- East Field Saipan, Mariana Islands, c. 23 June 1944
- Ie Shima Airfield, Okinawa, 30 April 1945
- Naha Airfield, Okinawa, November–December 1945
- Fort Lewis, Washington, 11–12 January 1946
- Hamilton Field (later AFB), California, 1 August 1947 – 27 June 1949
- Ramey AFB, Puerto Rico, 16 June 1952
- Seymour Johnson AFB, North Carolina, 5 January 1959 – 15 April 1963

=== Aircraft ===
- Boeing P-26, 1941
- P-40 Warhawk, 1941–1943
- P-47 Thunderbolt, 1943–1945
- P-38 Lightning, 1944–1945
- RB-36 Peacekeeper, 1953–1958
- B-52G Stratofortress, 1959–1963

== See also ==
- List of B-52 Units of the United States Air Force
