= 52nd Bombardment Squadron =

52d Bombardment Squadron
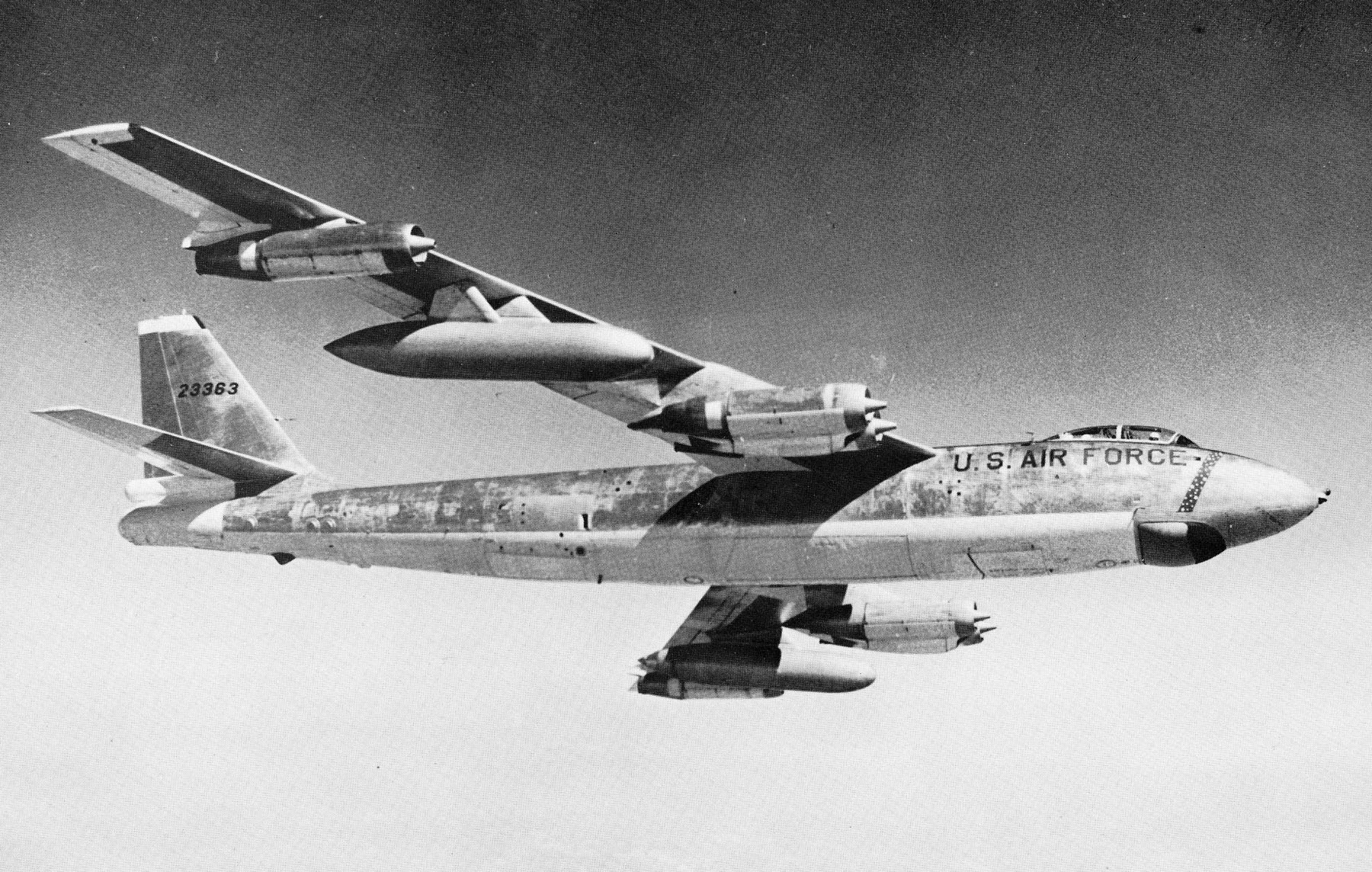
- B-47 Stratojet as flown by the squadron
- Active: 1947–1949; 1951–1963
- Country: United States
- Branch: United States Air Force
- Role: Strategic bombardment

Insignia
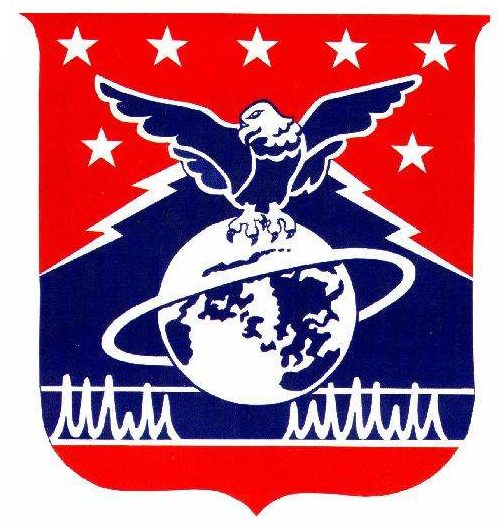
- 52nd Bombardment Squadron emblem (Note: Approved 12 June 1952.)

The 52nd Bombardment Squadron is an inactive United States Air Force strategic bombardment unit. It was activated as the 52nd Reconnaissance Squadron in the reserves from 1947 to 1949, but was not fully manned or equipped with operational aircraft before inactivating in 1949.

The squadron was reactivated as the 52nd Strategic Reconnaissance Squadron in 1952. It briefly flew Boeing B-29 Superfortresses, but soon equipped with Boeing B-47 Stratojets as a strategic bomber unit assigned to the 68th Bombardment Wing at Chennault Air Force Base, Louisiana. It was inactivated in 1963 as the B-47 began to be withdrawn from active service and Chenault was closing.

== History ==
=== Air Force reserve ===
The squadron first activated in the reserve in August 1947 as the 52nd Reconnaissance Squadron at Hamilton Field, California where it was assigned to the 68th Reconnaissance Group. The 415th AAF Base Unit (later the 2346 AF Reserve Training Center) of Air Defense Command supervised the squadron's training.

As the post war Air Force took shape, the National Guard was considered the first line of reserve. Reserve units got what was left over after National Guard units received facilities, equipment and aircraft. Aircraft were allotted to reserve units as a means of maintaining flying proficiency, not combat readiness. Aircraft assigned to the reserves were overwhelmingly trainers, with a few fighters and no bombers. The fighters had been withdrawn in December 1946, and no heavy bombers were ever assigned. The allotment of units to the reserves was made only for planning purposes and mobilization plans called for personnel assigned to the units to be called to active duty during mobilization as individuals, not as units.

In 1948 Continental Air Command assumed responsibility for managing reserve and Air National Guard units from ADC. In May 1949, the Air Force reorganized its operational reserve forces into 25 wings located at 23 reserve training centers, a reduction of 18 training centers. In this reduction, the squadron was inactivated in June 1949.

=== Strategic Air Command ===
The squadron was redesignated the 52nd Strategic Reconnaissance Squadron and activated in October 1951 at Lake Charles Air Force Base, receiving its initial cadre from the 44th Bombardment Wing. The squadron began training with Boeing B-29 Superfortresses borrowed from other units, until receiving its own B-29s in May 1952. Never having flown reconnaissance missions, it became the 52nd Bombardment Squadron the following month. It operated with B-29s until late 1953 when the squadron received new Boeing B-47 Stratojet bombers. Only about half of the B-47s initially assigned to the 68th Wing were equipped for combat. Becoming operationally ready with the B-47 in May 1954, the squadron conducted strategic bombardment training to meet Strategic Air Command (SAC)'s global commitments.

The squadron deployed its Stratojets with the 68th Wing to RAF Fairford from 14 June to 7 August 1954 and to RAF Brize Norton from 25 September 1957 to 8 January 1958. Unit deployments were replaced by Operation Reflex alert operations by October 1957. Reflex placed Stratojets on alert at bases closer to the Soviet Union for 90 day periods, although individuals rotated back to home bases during unit Reflex deployments. The 68th Wing detached crews and planes for Reflex to RAF Fairford and to Sidi Slimane Air Base, Morocco.

From 1958, the Boeing B-47 Stratojet units of SAC began to assume an alert posture at their home bases, reducing the amount of time spent on alert at overseas bases. General Thomas S. Power set an initial goal of maintaining one third of SAC's planes on fifteen minute ground alert, fully fueled and ready for combat to reduce vulnerability to a Soviet missile strike. The SAC alert commitment was increased to half the squadron's aircraft in 1962.

Soon after the detection of Soviet missiles in Cuba, SAC brought all degraded and adjusted alert sorties up to full capability. On 22 October, B-47s were dispersed. Most dispersal bases were civilian airfields with Air Force Reserve or Air National Guard units. B-47s were configured for execution of the Emergency War Order as soon as possible after dispersal. On 24 October SAC went to DEFCON 2, placing all the squadron's aircraft on alert. With easing tensions, on 15 November 1/6 of the squadron's dispersed B-47s were recalled to their home bases. On 21 November SAC went to DEFCON 3 and the remaining dispersed B-47s were recalled on 24 November. On 27 November SAC returned to normal alert posture. On its return to Chennault, the squadron began phasing down in preparation for the base's closure. It became non-operational on 20 March 1963, and was inactivated on 15 April 1963.

== Lineage ==
- Constituted as the 52nd Reconnaissance Squadron, Weather Scouting c. 10 March 1947

Activated 12 July 1947
Inactivated on 27 June 1949
Redesignated 52nd Strategic Reconnaissance Squadron, Photographic c. 4 October 1951
Activated on 10 October 1951
Redesignated 52nd Bombardment Squadron, Medium on 16 June 1952
Inactivated on 15 April 1963

=== Assignments ===
- 68th Reconnaissance Group, 12 July 1947 – 27 June 1949
- 68th Strategic Reconnaissance Group, 10 October 1951 (attached to 68th Bombardment Wing)
- 68th Bombardment Wing, 16 June 1952 – 15 April 1963 (not operational after 20 March 1963)

=== Stations ===
- Hamilton Field (later Hamilton Air Force Base), California, c. 12 July 1947 – 27 June 1949
- Lake Charles Air Force Base (later Chennault Air Force Base, Louisiana, 10 October 1951 – 15 April 1963

=== Aircraft ===
- Boeing B-29 Superfortress, 1951–1953
- Boeing B-47 Stratojet, 1953–1963

== See also ==
- List of United States Air Force weather reconnaissance squadrons
- List of B-47 units of the United States Air Force
- List of B-29 Superfortress operators

== Notes ==
Explanatory notes

Citations

=== Bibliography ===
- Cantwell, Gerald T. (1997). Citizen Airmen: a History of the Air Force Reserve, 1946-1994 (PDF). Washington, D.C.: Air Force History and Museums Program. ISBN 0-16049-269-6.
- Kipp, Robert; Peake, Lynn; Wolk, Herman. "Strategic Air Command Operations in the Cuban Crisis of 1962, SAC Historical Study No. 90 (Top Secret NOFORN, FRD, redacted and declassified)" (PDF).
- Maurer, Maurer, ed. (1983) [1961]. Air Force Combat Units of World War II (PDF) (reprint ed.). Washington, DC: Office of Air Force History. ISBN 0-912799-02-1. LCCN 61060979. Archived from the original (PDF) on 20 December 2016.
- Narducci, Henry M. (1988). Strategic Air Command and the Alert Program: A Brief History. Offutt AFB, NE: Office of the Historian, Strategic Air Command.
- Ravenstein, Charles A. (1984). Air Force Combat Wings, Lineage & Honors Histories 1947-1977 (PDF). Washington, DC: Office of Air Force History. ISBN 0-912799-12-9.
- Schake, Col Kurt W. (1998). Strategic Frontier: American Bomber Bases Overseas, 1950-1960 (PDF). Trondheim, Norway: Norwegian University of Science and Technology. ISBN 978-8277650241.
- Alert Operations and the Strategic Air Command, 1957-1991 (PDF). Offutt AFB, NE: Office of the Historian, Strategic Air Command. 1991.
