= 53rd Electronic Warfare Group =

- Active: 1941–1944; 1947–1949; 1952–1982; 1982–1991; 1993–1998; 1998–2021
- Country: United States
- Branch: United States Air Force
- Mottos: Victoria per Observatiam (Latin for 'Victory through Observation'); Follow Me
- Engagements: American Theater of World War II Mediterranean Theater of Operations
- Decorations: Air Force Outstanding Unit Award; Air Force Organizational Excellence Award

Insignia
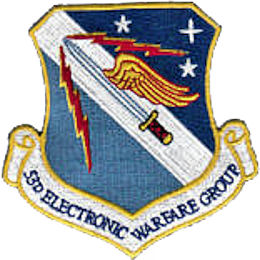
- Patch with 53rd Electronic Warfare Group emblem (Note: The group uses the 53rd Wing emblem with the group designation on the scroll. Bailey.)

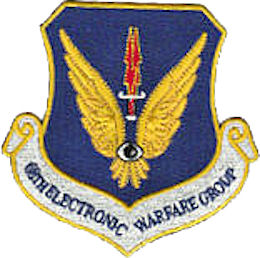
- Patch with 68th Electronic Warfare Group emblem

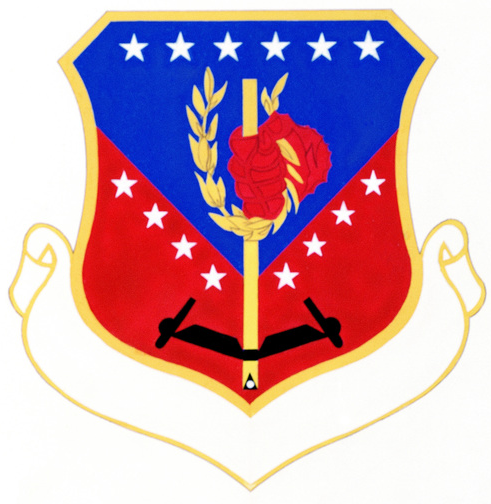
- 68th Air Refueling Wing emblem (Note: Approved c. December 1986.) (Note: The image of an air refueling boom on the emblem was changed from the type used on the KC-135 to that used on the KC-10.)

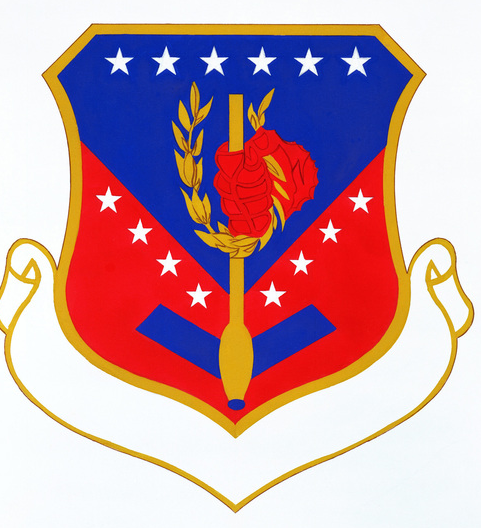
- 68th Air Refueling Group emblem (Note: Approved September 1982.)

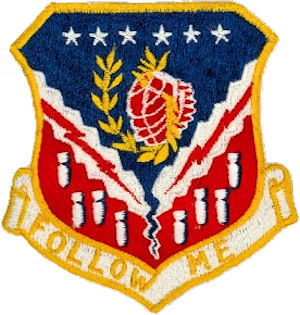
- Patch with 68th Bombardment Wing emblem (Note: Approved 3 October 1952.)

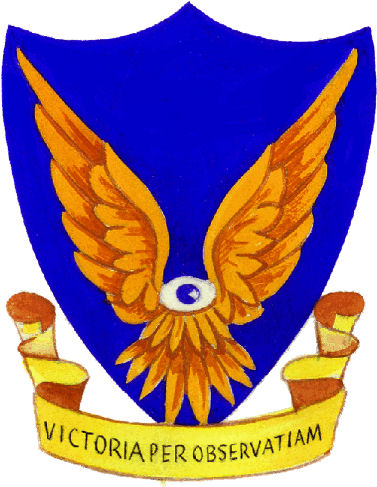
- Emblem of the 68th Reconnaissance Group (Note: Approved 17 September 1942.)

The 53rd Electronic Warfare Group was a component of the 53rd Wing of the Air Force Warfare Center, Air Combat Command, headquartered at Eglin Air Force Base, Florida. It was active from 1998 to 2021.

The group was responsible for providing operational, technical and maintenance electronic warfare expertise to USAF air combat forces, and for systems engineering, testing, evaluation, tactics development, employment, capability and technology assessment. This includes the wartime responsibility for emergency reprogramming and dissemination of EW system mission data software for combat aircraft. The group managed the Combat Shield Electronic Warfare Assessment Program for combat aircraft EW systems. Combat Shield provides operational units a system-specific capability assessment for their radar warning receivers, electronic attack pods, and integrated EW systems.

Tracing its history to the 1941 activation of the 68th Observation Group, the unit traces its lineage and heritage to the 68th Strategic Reconnaissance Group; the 68th Air Refueling Group; the 68th Bombardment Wing, Heavy, and the 68th Electronic Combat Group.

== History ==
=== World War II ===
The 68th Observation Group was established at Brownwood Army Air Field, Texas, on 1 September 1941. Its primary mission was observation aircraft training and antisubmarine patrols. The group moved to several different U.S. locations in preparation for overseas deployment in 1942.

It moved to the Mediterranean Theater of Operations (MTO), October–November 1942, and became part of Twelfth Air Force. Shortly after the group began operations most of its squadrons were detached for separate duty in order to carry out diverse activities over a wide area. Operating from bases in North Africa until November 1943, the group, or elements of the group, engaged in patrolling the Mediterranean; strafing trucks, tanks, gun positions, and supply dumps to support ground troops in Tunisia; training fighter pilots and replacement crews; and flying photographic and visual reconnaissance missions in Tunisia, Sicily, and Italy to provide information needed to adjust artillery fire.

The group moved to Italy and became part of Fifteenth Air Force in November 1943. It continued visual and photographic reconnaissance and began flying weather reconnaissance missions in Italy, France, Germany, Austria, Hungary, and the[Balkans. Also engaged in electronic-countermeasure activities, investigating radar equipment captured from the enemy, flying ferret missions along the coasts of Italy and southern France, and accompanying bomber formations to detect approaching enemy fighters. It was inactivated in 1944.

=== Strategic reconnaissance ===
The unit trained in the Reserve as the 68th Reconnaissance Group at Hamilton Field (later Hamilton Air Force Base), California between 1947 and 1949. In 1949 it was inactivated, as a result of Continental Air Command's reorganization of its flying units under the Wing-Base Hobson Plan. Its personnel were transferred to the 349th Troop Carrier Wing.

The 68th Strategic Reconnaissance Wing was activated by Strategic Air Command (SAC) on 10 October 1951, with an initial cadre of 16 people from the 44th Bombardment Wing. The group was assigned as a subordinate unit to the new wing at Lake Charles Air Force Base, Louisiana. The wing was assigned to the 37th Air Division of Second Air Force. The group was activated as the 68th Strategic Reconnaissance Group, but it was a paper unit, with token personnel assigned on additional duty to keep it active and with its flying squadrons controlled by the wing. Support organizations for the wing were also activated, but they were located at Lockbourne AFB, Ohio and were not controlled by the wing.

It was not until May 1952 that the wing received Boeing RB-29 Superfortress aircraft. Its primary mission was gathering intelligence on the Soviet Union. In June the group was discontinued entirely. Under SAC's new Dual Deputate organization, (Note: Under this plan flying [and missile] squadrons reported to the wing Deputy Commander for Operations and maintenance squadrons reported to the wing Deputy Commander for Maintenance.) squadrons all flying and maintenance squadrons were directly assigned to the wing, so no operational group element was needed. It added a Boeing KC-97 refueling mission in November 1953.

=== Strategic bombardment ===
==== Medium Bomber era ====
The wing replaced its propeller-driven RB-29s with new Boeing B-47E Stratojet swept-wing medium bombers in October 1953 and was redesignated as the 68th Bombardment Wing. The B-47 was capable of flying at high subsonic speeds and primarily designed for penetrating the airspace of the Soviet Union. Becoming operationally ready with the B-47 in May 1954, the wing conducted strategic bombardment training and air refueling to meet SAC's global commitments. The wing performed deployments to RAF Fairford, from 14 June to 7 August 1954 and to RAF Brize Norton, both in the southern United Kingdom, from 27 September 1957 to 8 January 1958. The B-47s were reaching the end of their operational life in the late 1950s, and the wing's aircraft were sent to Davis-Monthan Air Force Base in April 1963 with the closure of Chennault AFB. With the closing of Chennault, and in order to retain the lineage of the wing, Headquarters SAC received authority from Headquarters USAF to move the 68th without personnel or equipment to Seymour Johnson Air Force Base, North Carolina on 15 April where it replaced the 4241st Strategic Wing, which could not carry a permanent history or lineage.

==== Heavy Bombardment era ====
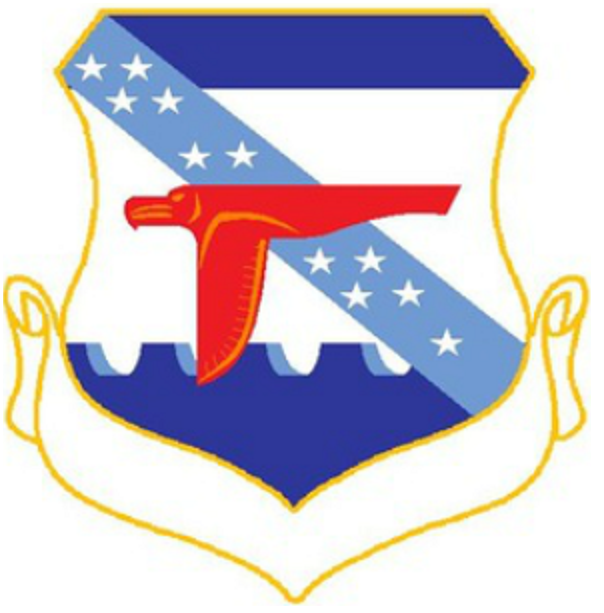
4241st Strategic Wing emblem

4241st Strategic Wing

SAC had organized the 4241st Strategic Wing at Seymour Johnson on 1 October 1958 and assigned it to Second Air Force as part of SAC's plan to disperse its Boeing B-52 Stratofortress heavy bombers over a larger number of bases, thus making it more difficult for the Soviet Union to knock out the entire fleet with a surprise first strike. The wing remained a headquarters only until 1 December 1959 when the 911th Air Refueling Squadron, flying Boeing KC-135 Stratotankers, three maintenance squadrons, and a squadron to provide security for special weapons were activated and assigned to the wing.

On 5 January 1959 the 73rd Bombardment Squadron, consisting of 15 Boeing B-52 Stratofortresses moved to Seymour Johnson from Ramey Air Force Base, Puerto Rico where it had been one of the three squadrons of the 72nd Bombardment Wing and the wing was transferred from Second Air Force to the 822nd Air Division. The wing was fully organized at the start of May when the 53rd Aviation Depot Squadron' moved from Barksdale Air Force Base, Louisiana to oversee the wing's special weapons. Starting in 1960, one third of the squadron's aircraft were maintained on fifteen-minute alert, fully fueled and ready for combat to reduce vulnerability to a Soviet missile strike. This was increased to half the squadron's aircraft in 1962. The 4241st (and later the 68th) continued to maintain an alert commitment until the end of the Cold War. In 1962, the wing's bombers began to be equipped with the GAM-77 Hound Dog and the GAM-72 Quail air-launched cruise missiles, The 4134th Airborne Missile Maintenance Squadron was activated in November to maintain these missiles.

68th Bombardment Wing, Heavy When the 68th replaced the 4341st (Note: The 68th Wing continued, through temporary bestowal, the history, and honors of the World War II 68th Reconnaissance Group. It was also entitled to retain the honors (but not the history or lineage) of the 4341st Strategic Wing. This temporary bestowal ended when the wing and group were consolidated into a single unit.) the 53rd Munitions Maintenance Squadron and the 911th Air Refueling Squadron were reassigned to the 68th. The 4241st's maintenance and security squadrons were replaced by ones with the 68th numerical designation. Each of the new units assumed the personnel, equipment, and mission of its predecessor.

The wing continued to conduct strategic bombardment training and global refueling operations to meet SAC commitments. Wing aircraft, most aircrews and maintenance personnel, and other support personnel were loaned to other SAC units for combat operations in Southeast Asia, 27 May 1972 – 15 July 1973.

=== Air refueling ===
In 1982 the B-52Gs of the wing were retired and the 68th Wing became the 68th Air Refueling Group. Elevated back to wing status in 1986, the 68th Air Refueling Wing participated in combat operations in Grenada (Operation Urgent Fury) in October 1983, in Libya (Operation Eldorado Canyon) in April 1986, and in Panama (Operation Just Cause) in December 1989. It deployed to Spain to provide airlift and air refueling during Operation Desert Shield/Desert Storm from August 1990 to March 1991.

The 68th Air Refueling Wing was inactivated on 22 April 1991 as part of the objective wing reorganization of the Air Force, which called for one wing on a base. Its 911th Air Refueling Squadron was reassigned to the 4th Wing. Its support organizations were inactivated and their personnel and equipment assigned to elements of the 4th Wing or transferred,

=== The 1990s and twenty-first century ===
The group was activated again on 15 April 1993 as the 68th Electronic Combat Group. It provided operational and technical electronic combat expertise for US combat air forces from 1993 to 1998 when it was inactivated and replaced by the 53rd Electronic Warfare Group due to USAF policy that groups carry the same number as their parent wing. Two years later the 68th was consolidated with the 53rd that had replaced it. The group performed electronic warfare technology assessments; tested, developed, managed, and maintained electronic warfare systems hardware and software to meet Combat Air Force mission requirements. In June 2021, the group was inactivated and its assets were used to form the 350th Spectrum Warfare Wing.

== Lineage ==
68th Electronic Combat Group

- Constituted as 68th Observation Group on 21 August 1941

Activated on 1 September 1941
Redesignated 68th Reconnaissance Group on 31 May 1943
Redesignated 68th Tactical Reconnaissance Group on 13 November 1943
Disbanded on 15 June 1944
Reconstituted and redesignated 68th Reconnaissance Group, on 10 March 1947
Activated in the Reserve on 9 April 1947
Inactivated on 27 June 1949
Redesignated 68th Strategic Reconnaissance Group, Medium on 4 October 1951
Activated on 10 October 1951
Inactivated on 16 June 1952
Redesignated 68th Air Refueling Group, Heavy on 17 March 1982
Activated on 30 September 1982
Consolidated with the 68th Bombardment Wing, Heavy on 1 October 1982
Redesignated 68th Air Refueling Wing, Heavy on 1 October 1986
Inactivated on 22 April 1991
Redesignated 68th Electronic Combat Group on 9 April 1993
Activated on 15 April 1993
Inactivated on 20 November 1998
Consolidated with the 53rd Electronic Warfare Group on 25 July 2000 as the 53rd Electronic Warfare Group

68th Bombardment Wing

- Constituted as 68th Strategic Reconnaissance Wing, Medium on 4 October 1951

Activated on 10 October 1951
Redesignated 68th Bombardment Wing, Medium on 16 June 1952
Redesignated: 68th Bombardment Wing, Heavy on 15 April 1963
Organized on 15 April 1963
Inactivated on 30 September 1982
Consolidated with the 68th Air Refueling Group on 1 October 1982 as the 68th Air Refueling Group

53rd Electronic Warfare Group

- Constituted on 1 November 1998 as 53rd Electronic Warfare Group

Activated on 20 November 1998

- Consolidated with the 68th Electronic Warfare Group on 25 July 2000

Inactivated c. 25 June 2021

=== Assignments ===
68th Group, 1941–1952

- 3rd Air Support Command, 1 September 1941
- Third Air Force, 17 March 1942
- III Ground Air Support Command, 19 May 1942

Attached to 3rd Demonstration Air Task Force [Provisional], c. 12 June 1942 – unknown
VIII Ground Air Support Command, c. 18–22 June 1942

- VIII Ground Air Support Command, 23 June 1942
- III Ground Air Support Command, c. 4 June 1942
- Third Air Force, 21 August 1942
- III Ground Air Support Command, 24 August 1942
- XII Air Support Command, c. 18 October 1942 (attached to 5th Bombardment Wing after 31 October 1942)
- Northwest African Tactical Air Force, c. 18 June 1943 (attached to 5th Bombardment Wing)
- XII Training Command, c. March 1943 (attached to 5th Bombardment Wing)
- XII Bomber Command, 18 October 1943 (attached to 5th Bombardment Wing)
- Fifteenth Air Force, 1 November 1943 – 15 June 1944 (attached to 5th Bombardment Wing to 4 December 1943, attached to 47th Bombardment Wing, 4 December 1943 – 24 May 1944)
- 325th Reconnaissance Wing (later, 325th Air Division), 10 March 1947 – 27 June 1949
- 68th Strategic Reconnaissance Wing, 10 October 1951 – 16 June 1952

68th Wing, 1951–1982

- 37th Air Division, 10 October 1951 (attached to 21st Air Division until c. 15 May 1952)
- Second Air Force, 28 May 1952
- 806th Air Division, 16 June 1952 (attached to 7th Air Division), 14 June – 7 August 1954; 27 September 1957 – 8 January 1958)
- 825th Air (later, 825th Strategic Aerospace) Division), 15 June 1960
- 822nd Air Division, 15 April 1963
- 57th Air Division, 1 July 1964
- 822nd Air Division, 1 July 1965
- 57th Air Division, 2 September 1966
- 823rd Air Division, 2 July 1969
- 42nd Air Division, 30 June 1971 – 30 September 1982

Consolidated Organization

- 42nd Air Division, from consolidation in 1982
- Eighth Air Force, 16 June 1988 – 22 April 1991
- USAF Air Warfare Center (later, 53rd Wing), 15 April 1993 – 20 November 1998
- 53rd Wing, 20 November 1998 - c. 25 June 2021

=== Components ===
68th Group, 1941–1952

- 15th Observation Squadron: 12 December 1941 – 2 February 1942
- 16th Observation (later, 16th Reconnaissance) Squadron: attached February–March 1942, assigned 29 March 1942 – 26 May 1944 (detached 25 September 1943 – 26 May 1944)
- 24th Reconnaissance, Very Long Range (Photographic) (later, 24th Strategic Reconnaissance, Medium (Photographic) Squadron): 12 July 1947 – 27 June 1949; 10 October 1951 – 16 June 1952 (detached 10 October 1951 – 16 June 1952)
- 51st Reconnaissance, Weather (later, 51st Strategic Reconnaissance, Photographic) Squadron: 1 August 1947 – 27 June 1949; 10 August 1951 – 16 June 1952 (detached 10 October 1951 – 16 June 1952)
- 52nd Reconnaissance, Weather Scouting (later, 52nd Strategic Reconnaissance, Photographic) Squadron: 12 July 1947 – 27 June 1949; 10 October 1951 – 16 June 1952 (detached 10 October 1951 – 16 June 1952)
- 68th Air Refueling Squadron: 8 April – 28 May 1952
- 111th Observation (later, 111th Reconnaissance, Fighter; 111th Tactical Reconnaissance): attached February–March 1942, assigned 29 March 1942 – 26 May 1944 (detached 12 March 1943 – 26 May 1944)
- 122nd Observation (later, 122nd Liaison; 885th Bombardment): 1 October 1941 – 15 June 1944
- 125th Observation: 15 September 1941 – 12 March 1942
- 127th Observation: 6 October 1941 – 12 March 1942
- 154th Observation (later, 154th Reconnaissance; 154th Tactical Reconnaissance; 154th Weather Reconnaissance): 1 September 1941 – 15 June 1944 (detached 12 March 1943 – 15 June 1944)

68th Wing, 1951–1982

- 68th Air Base Group (later 68th Combat Support Group): 14 February 1952 – 28 May 1952, 15 June 1960 – 15 April 1963
- 68th Maintenance & Supply Group: 10 October 1951 – 16 June 1952
- 68th Strategic Reconnaissance Group: 10 October 1951 – 16 June 1952
- 24th Strategic Reconnaissance, Photographic (later, 24th Bombardment) Squadron: attached 10 October 1951 – 15 June 1952, assigned 16 June 1952 – 16 January 1953
- 51st Strategic Reconnaissance, Photographic (later, 51st Bombardment) Squadron: attached 10 October 1951 – 15 June 1952, assigned 16 June 1952 – 30 September 1982
- 52nd Strategic Reconnaissance, Photographic (later, 52nd Bombardment) Squadron: attached 10 October 1951 – 15 June 1952, assigned 16 June 1952 – 15 April 1963
- 68th Air Refueling Squadron: attached 8 April – 28 May 1952; assigned 25 November 1953 – 3 September 1957
- 656th Bombardment Squadron: 16 January 1953 – 15 April 1963
- 657th Bombardment Squadron: 1 December 1958 – 1 January 1962
- 911th Air Refueling Squadron: 15 April 1963 – 30 September 1982
- 32nd Munitions Maintenance Squadron: 1 July 1960 – 15 April 1963
- 53rd Munitions Maintenance Squadron: 15 April 1963 – 30 September 1972
- 68th Medical Squadron (later 68th Medical Group, 68th Tactical Hospital): 10 October 1951 – 15 February 1952, 16 June 1952 – 1 December 1958
- 68th Airborne Missile Maintenance Squadron: 1 February 1963 – 30 June 1974
- 68th Armament & Electronics Maintenance Squadron (later 68th Avionics Maintenance Squadron): 16 June 1952 – 30 September 1982
- 68th Maintenance Squadron (later 68th Field Maintenance Squadron, 68th Consolidated Aircraft Maintenance Squadron): 16 June 1952 – 1 April 1991
- 68th Munitions Maintenance Squadron, 1 October 1972 – 30 September 1982
- 68th Periodic Maintenance Squadron (later 68th Organizational Maintenance Squadron): 16 June 1952 – 30 September 1982
- 4068th Armament & Electronics Maintenance Squadron: 10 October 1951 – 16 June 1952
- 4068th Organizational Maintenance Squadron: 10 October 1951 – 16 June 1952

Consolidated organization

- 16th Test (later, 16th Electronic Warfare) Squadron: 15 April 1993 – 20 November 1998, 20 November 1998 – c. 25 June 2021
- 36th Engineering and Test (later, 36th Electronic Warfare) Squadron: 15 April 1993 – 20 November 1998, 20 November 1998 – c. 25 June 2021
- 39th Electronic Warfare Squadron: c. 23 July 2020 – c. 25 June 2021
- 51st Bombardment Squadron: 30 September – 1 October 1982
- 53rd Computer Systems Squadron: 13 September 1999 – 1 October 2002
- 68th Test Support Squadron (later 68th Electronic Warfare Squadron): 15 April 1993 – 20 November 1998, 20 November 1998 – c. 25 June 2021
- 84th Test Squadron: 1 December 1991 – 15 April 1993
- 87th Electronic Warfare Aggressor Squadron (later 87th Electronic Warfare Squadron): 15 April 1993 – 1 July 1997, c. 17 May 2019 – c. 25 June 2021
- 344th Air Refueling Squadron: 1 October 1986 – 22 April 1991
- 453rd Electronic Warfare Squadron: Unknown – c. 25 June 2021
- 513th Electronic Warfare Squadron: 1 April 2010 – c. 25 June 2021
- 911th Air Refueling Squadron: 30 September 1982 – 22 April 1991

=== Stations ===
- Brownwood Army Air Field, Texas, 1 September 1941
- New Orleans Army Air Base, Louisiana, 17 December 1941
- Daniel Field, Georgia, 8 February 1942
- Smith Reynolds Airport, North Carolina, 9 July 1942
- Morris Field, North Carolina, c. 17 August – 18 October 1942
- Casablanca Airfield, French Morocco November 1942
- Oujda Airfield, French Morocco c. November 1942
- Berrechid Airfield, French Morocco 24 March 1943
- Berteaux Airfield, Algeria 5 September 1943
- Massicault Airfield, Tunisia October 1943
- Manduria Airfield, Italy November 1943
- Blida Airfield, Algeria, November 1943-15 June 1944
- Hamilton Field (later Hamilton Air Force Base), California, 9 April 1947 – 27 June 1949
- Lake Charles Air Force Base (later Chennault Air Force Base), Louisiana, 10 October 1951
- Seymour Johnson Air Force Base, North Carolina, 15 April 1963 – 30 September 1982; 30 September 1982 – 22 April 1991
- Eglin Air Force Base, Florida, 15 April 1993 – 20 November 1998, 20 November 1998 – c. 25 June 2021

=== Aircraft ===
68th Group 1941–1952: O-38, 1941–1942; O-46, 1941–1942; O-47, 1941–1942; O-49, 1941–1942; YO-50, 1941–1942; O-52, 1941–1942; O-57, 1941–1942; O-58, 1941–1942; O-59, 1941–1942; A-20, 1942–1943; DB-7, 1942; L-4, 1942; O-43, 1942; P-39, 1942–1943; P-40, 1942–1943; P-43, 1942; A-36, 1943; B-17, 1943–1944; P-38, 1943; P-38/F-4, 1943; P-51, 1943; P-51/F-6, 1943; Spitfire, 1943. A-6, 1947–1949; A-7, 1947–1949; A-11, 1947–1949.

68th Wing 1951–1982: B-29, 1952–1953; B-47, 1953–1963; KC-97, 1953–1957; B-52, 1963–1972, 1973–1982; KC-135, 1963–1972; 1973–1985.

Consolidated organization: KC-10, 1982–1991; KC-135, 1982–1991. None, 1993–1998

== See also ==
- List of B-29 units of the United States Air Force
- List of B-47 units of the United States Air Force
- List of B-52 Units of the United States Air Force
- List of MAJCOM wings of the United States Air Force
