= 4397th Air Refueling Wing (Training) =

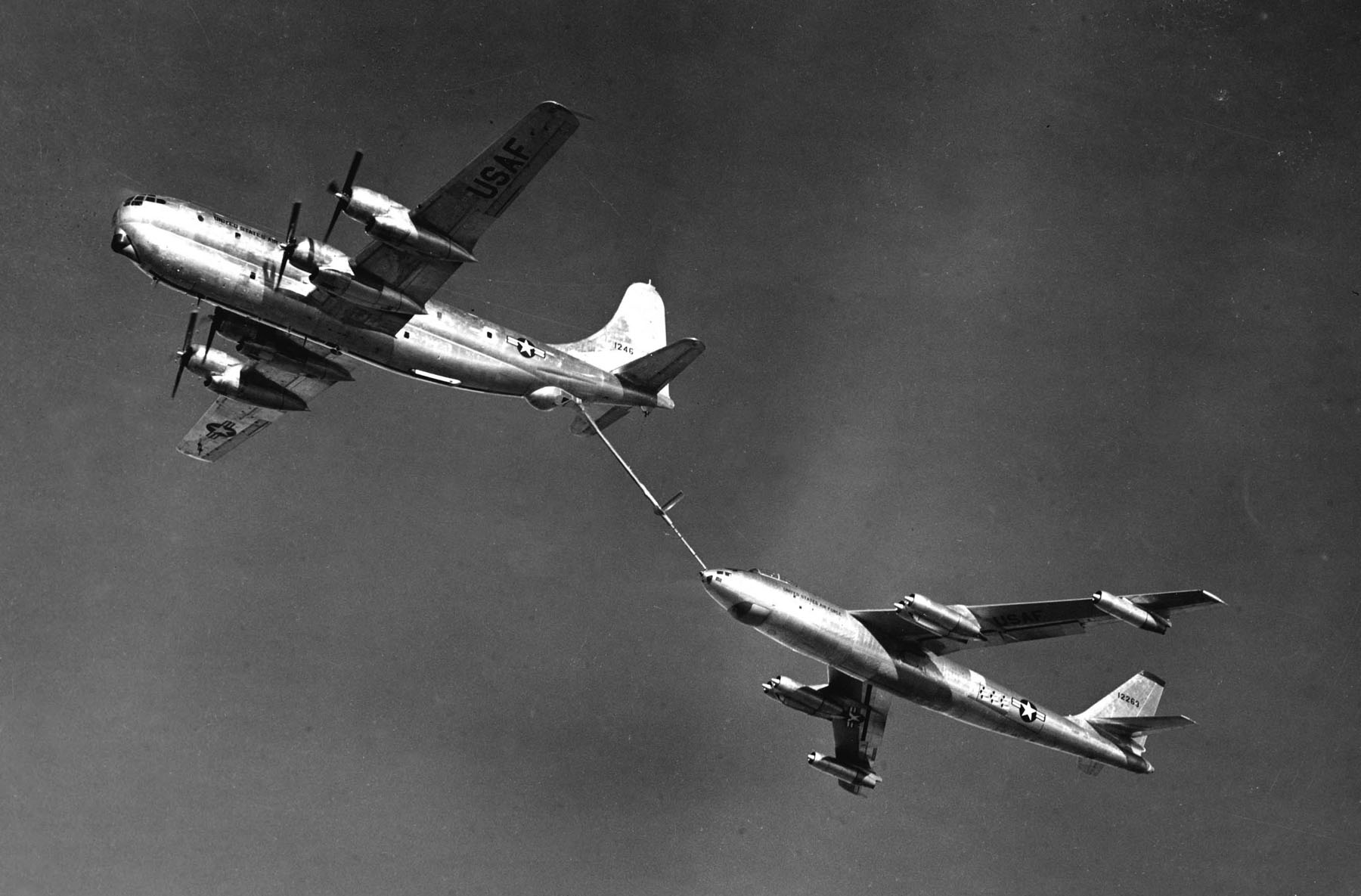
- KC-97 Stratofreighter refueling a B-47 Stratojet
- Active: 1958–1962
- Country: United States
- Branch: United States Air Force
- Role: Air refueling training

Insignia
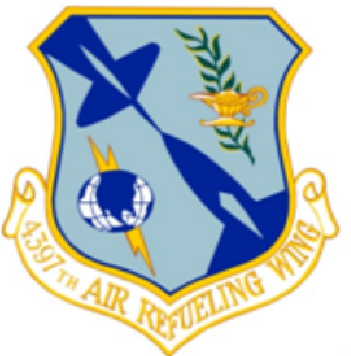
- 4397th Air Refueling Wing emblem (Note: Approved 8 July 1959. Description: On a sky proper within a diminshed border or fimbriated azure, issuant from sinister base bendwise the front half of a stylized aircraft with connecting refueling line attached to the tail end of another stylized aircraft in dexter chief all of the third [color] detailed of the first [color], in sinister chief an olive branch vert edged of the second [color]and surmounted by lamp of knowledge of the like [color] in dexter base a lightning flash of the last [color] surmounted by an ellispsoid argent, land masses and grid lines of the third [color]. Significance: The emblem is symbolic of the wing and its mission. The background of light blue indicates the sky, the primary theater of operations. The aircraft represents the air refueling component of the wing and the lightning indicates the swift, sure actions of refueling as well as potential striking force. The globe symbolizes worldwide support, the lamp of knowledge represents the wings primary mission as a training unit supporting SAC and the USAF and the olive branch symbol of peace, indicates that with a well trained air refueling force, the mission of SAC can be met thus insuring national and world security. The emblem displays the Air Force colors, ultramarine blue and golden yellow.))

The United States Air Force's 4397th Air Refueling Wing (Training) was an air refueling training unit located at Randolph Air Force Base, Texas. It operated Boeing KC-97 Stratofreighters with an authorization for 40 aircraft. (Note: This was later increased to 45 aircraft. Hopkins & Goldberg, p. 80.) The wing was assigned to 2d Air Force

== History ==
In 1958, Air Training Command (ATC) transferred its crew training to the operational commands. Its 3511th Combat Crew Training Squadron at Randolph Air Force Base, Texas had been performing crew training for Boeing KC-97 Stratofreighter as part of the 3510th Combat Crew Training Wing. On 1 July 1958 Strategic Air Command (SAC) formed the 4397th Air Refueling Wing to perform this function. The wing mission was to provide comprehensive training for air refueling crews. It focused on qualifying and crews to maintain proficiency in aerial refueling operations, enabling SAC's strategic bomber and reconnaissance units to conduct extended-range missions during the Cold War and extend the reach and endurance of SAC's Boeing B-47 Stratojets and Boeing B-52 Stratofortresses.

Training emphasized the operational aspects of the KC-97, which utilized a flying boom method to refueling jet-powered bombers. Crews received instruction in the swift and accurate execution of refueling procedures, tailored to the demands of SAC's potential striking forces. The wing included the 4397th Combat Crew Training Squadron, which conducted hands-on KC-97 instruction.

The wing continued this training as a tenant unit at Randolph until 15 June 1962, when SAC's individual air refueling units began training their own crews. In addition, ATC had been wanting to have the SAC wing transfer from its base to make room for its own advanced pilot training program, (Note: When ATC transferred B-47 training to SAC in 1958, it had also transferred McConnell Air Force Base, Kansas. However, its 3510th Wing copntinued to operate at Randollph. Manning, p. 119.) and the Boeing KC-135 Stratotanker was coming into service with SAC's air refueling units.

== Lineage ==
- Designated as the 4397th Air Refueling Wing (Training) and organized on 1 July 1958
- Discontinued on 15 June 1962

=== Assignments ===
- 2nd Air Force, 1 July 1958
- 42nd Air Division, 15 July 1959 – 15 June 1962

=== Components ===
- 4397th Combat Crew Training Squadron, 1 July 1958 – 15 June 1962
- 4397th Consolidated Aircraft Maintenance Squadron, 1 July 1958 – 15 June 1962

=== Stations ===
- Randolph Air Force Base, Texas, 1 July 1958 – 15 June 1962
