= List of United States Air Force weather reconnaissance squadrons =

This is a List of United States weather reconnaissance squadrons- USAAF -USAF.

Squadron	Insignia	Location	Nickname	Aircraft Flown	Note
Weather Reconnaissance Squadron (Provisional)		RAF St Eval, RAF Bovingdon			8 September 1943 – 28 March 1944 (discontinued and split into two squadrons)
Army Air Forces Weather Reconnaissance Squadron (Test) Number 1		Patterson Field, Truax Field, Presque Isle Army Air Field		A-28, B-25	12 August 1942 – 6 December 1943 (Redesignated 30th WRS)
1st Weather Reconnaissance Squadron, Air Route, Medium		Presque Isle Army Air Field, Grenier Field		B-17, B-25	21 August 1944 – 21 December 1945 (was 30 WRS, Inactivated)
1st Weather Reconnaissance Squadron (Special)		Fairfield-Suisun AFB		WB-29	1 June 1948 – 1 October 1948 (Redesignated the 2078th Air WRS)
2d Weather Reconnaissance Squadron, Air Route (Medium)		Key Field, Gushkara, India		B-25	1 February 1944 – 28 December 1945 (Inactivated)
3d Weather Reconnaissance Squadron, Air Route (Medium) (later 3d Reconnaissance Squadron, Weather, Heavy)		Presque Isle Army Air Field, Grenier Field		RB-17, TB-17	31 August 1944 – 15 June 1945 (Redesignated 53d Recon Sq, Long Range, Weather)
3.4.4 Weather Reconnaissance Squadron, Provisional		Tinker AFB			5 July 1950 – 1 June 1951 (part of Joint Task Group 3.4)
8th Weather Reconnaissance Squadron (Heavy) (Provisional)		RAF Bovingdon, RAF Watton			28 March 1944 – 9 August 1944 (discontinued)
8th Weather Reconnaissance Squadron (Light) (Provisional)		RAF Bovingdon, RAF Watton			28 March 1944 – 9 August 1944 (discontinued)
30th Weather Reconnaissance Squadron, Air Route, Medium		Presque Isle Army Air Field		B-17, B-25	1944 - Redesignated 1st WRS
53d Weather Reconnaissance Squadron		Keesler AFB	"Hurricane Hunters"	WC-130	15 June 1945 - (was 3d WRS, earlier 53d Reconnaissance Sq, Wx and 53d Strategic Reconnaissance Sq, Wx)
654th Weather Reconnaissance Squadron		Andersen AFB	"Typhoon Chasers"	Mosquito Mk XII, WB-29, WB-50, WB-47, WC-130	1944–1945; redesignated 4 September 1945 – 30 September 1987 (Inactivated Previously 654th Bomb Sq, H (Recon, Spl), 54th Reconnaissance Sq, Wx, 54th Strategic Reconnaissance Sq, Wx)
655th Weather Reconnaissance Squadron		Harmon Field, Buckley Field, Langley Field, Morrison Field, Fairfield-Suisun AFB, McClellan AFB		B-24 1944/1945, B-29 1945-1947 HC-130	1944–1945; redesignated 16 June 1945 – 1 October 1993 (Previously 655th Bomb Sq, Recon 55th Reconnaissance Sq, Wx, 55th Strategic Reconnaissance Squadron, Wx. Redesignated 55th Space Weather Sq (inactive))
56th Weather Reconnaissance Squadron		Grenier Field		RB-57, WC-135	21 February 1951 – 15 January 1972 (Previously 358th Ftr Sq, 56th Strategic Reconnaissance Squadron, Wx Inactivated, 1972; Reactivated as the 358th TFS later that year)
57th Weather Reconnaissance Squadron		Hickam AFB		WB-57	Previously 399th Ftr Sq Inactivated, 1969
58th Weather Reconnaissance Squadron		Eielson AFB, Kirtland AFB	"Pole Vaulters"	B-29/RB-29/WB-29, WB-50	7 July 1945 – 30 June 1974 (Previously 400th Ftr Sq, 58th Reconnaissance Squadron, Wx, 58th Strategic Reconnaissance Squadron, Wx)
59th Weather Reconnaissance Squadron		MacDill Field, Castle Field, Fairfield-Suisun Army Air Field, Ladd Field, Kindley AFB, Goodfellow AFB	"Hurricane Hunters"	WB-50	1 August 1945 – 8 May 1964 (Previously 59th Reconnaissance Sq, Wx 59th Weather Reconnaissance Flight 8 May 1955 – 1 April 1956)
154th Weather Reconnaissance Squadron		Oran, Algeria	Ducimus "We Lead"	P-38	12 May 1944 – 4 September 1945 (Previously 154th Tactical Reconnaissance Squadron, Redesignated 63d Recce Sq, Wx, Allotted to the National Guard as 154th Ftr Sq)
815th Weather Reconnaissance Squadron		Keesler AFB	"Storm Trackers"	WC-130	1 January 1976 – 31 December 1987 (was 815th Tactical Airlift Squadron, redesignated 815th Tactical Airlift Squadron)
2078th Air Weather Reconnaissance Squadron, Special		Fairfield-Suisun AFB, Tinker AFB		WB-29	1 October 1948 – 20 March 1950 (Previously 1st Weather Reconnaissance Squadron, Special, Discontinued)
2079th Reconnaissance Squadron (Provisional)		Yokota AB, Japan			1 July 1949 – 1 December 1949 (discontinued)

== See also ==
- List of United States Air Force squadrons
