= 10th Air Base Wing =

10th Air Base Wing
- Active: 1947–1949; 1952–1994; 1994–present
- Country: United States
- Branch: United States Air Force
- Role: Air base support
- Part of: United States Air Force Academy
- Garrison/HQ: United States Air Force Academy
- Motto: Argus – Ceaseless Watch
- Engagements: Operation Desert Storm: Defense of Saudi Arabia; Liberation and Defense of Kuwait

- Decorations: Air Force Outstanding Unit Award (13×)

Commanders
- Current commander: Col. Amy M. Glisson
- Deputy Commander: Col. Daniel C. Werner
- Command Chief: CCM Jeremy C. Schoneboom
- Notable commanders: Robert Merrill Lee

Insignia
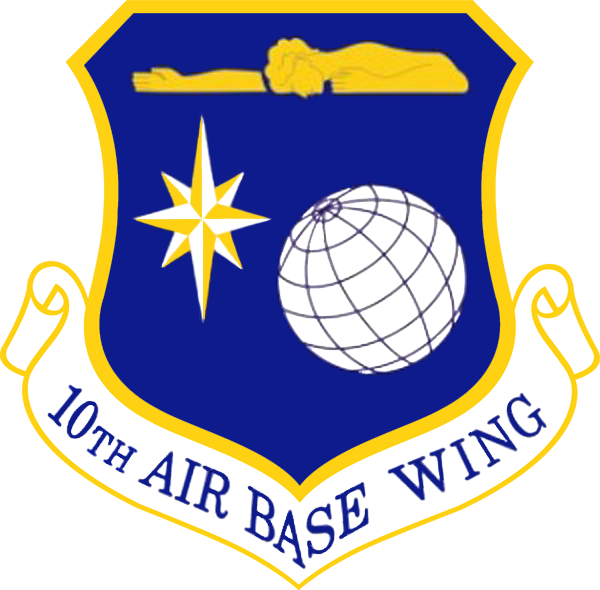
- 10th Air Base Wing Emblem (Note: Approved 20 June 1995.)

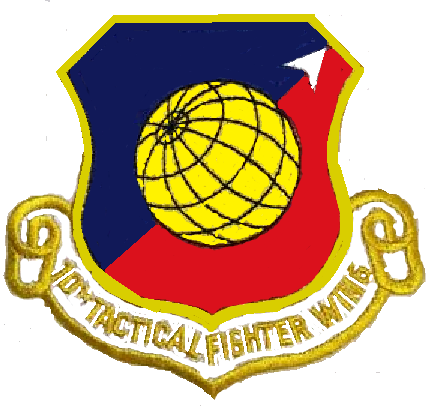
- Patch with 10th Tactical Fighter Wing emblem (Note: This emblem apparently never received official approval. Endicott, p. 44 (1995 emblem replaced emblem approved in 1954).)

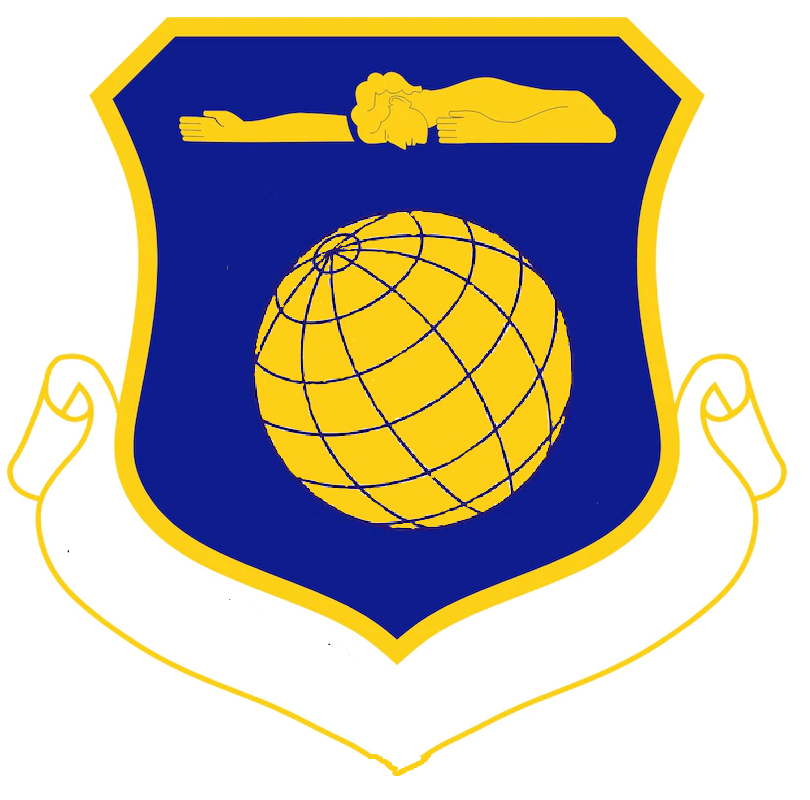
- 10th Tactical Reconnaissance Wing emblem (Note: approved 28 June 1954.)

The 10th Air Base Wing is a non-flying United States Air Force unit that is the host wing for the United States Air Force Academy in Colorado Springs, Colorado.

The Wing provides all base-level support activities to the academy. These activities include security, civil engineer, communications, logistics, military and civilian personnel, financial management, services, command post, chaplaincy, equal opportunity and the hospital, all of which support nearly 4,000 cadets and a total military community of approximately 20,000 personnel.

The 10th Tactical Fighter Wing was stationed in France, West Germany, and the United Kingdom for over 40 years during the Cold War. During its United States Air Forces Europe service, the wing received seven Air Force Outstanding Unit Awards and deployed personnel and equipment to King Fahd International Airport, Saudi Arabia and fought during Operation Desert Storm in 1991.

== History ==
Section source: 10th ABW History

=== 10th Tactical Reconnaissance Wing ===
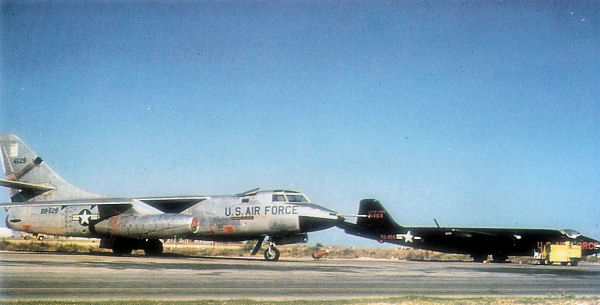
Wing RB-66B and B-57A at Spangdahlem AB, 1957

The wing was first organized as the 10th Reconnaissance Wing on 3 December 1947, at Pope Field, North Carolina as part of the experimental wing base reorganization, an Army Air Forces reorganization which assigned its operational groups and support organization to a single wing. The 10th Reconnaissance Group was the new wing's operational flying component. On 25 August 1948, the reorganization was made permanent and the wing became the 10th Tactical Reconnaissance Wing.

The 10th conducted training at Pope, primarily with army units at Fort Bragg President Truman's reduced 1949 defense budget required reductions in the number groups in the Air Force to 48, and the 10th was inactivated on 1 April 1949.

On 10 July 1952 as a result of the United States Cold War military buildup in Europe, the 10 TRW was reactivated and assigned to NATO at Toul-Rosières Air Base, France, absorbing the mission and equipment of the inactivating federalized 117th Tactical Reconnaissance Wing.

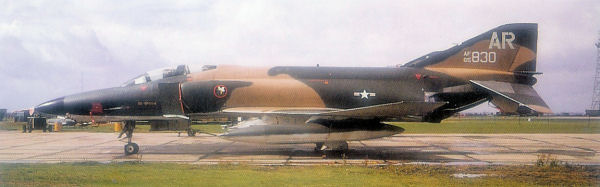
RF-4C Phantom of the 1st TRS, 1971

However, the base was not yet ready for jet aircraft, so only the 10th TRW Wing Headquarters was sent to Toul. The propeller-driven RB-26s of the former 112th TRS were absorbed by the 1st TRS at Toul, while the two RF-80A squadrons assigned to the 32d and 38th TRS were located at Neubiberg and Fürstenfeldbruck Air Bases near Munich, West Germany.

Ongoing construction delays in France forced the wing's transfer on 9 May 1953 to the newly completed Spangdahlem Air Base in West Germany where all the squadrons of the wing were united. The Republic RF-84F Thunderflash began to arrive in the fall of 1955, and the RF-80As were returned to the United States for Air National Guard use. Martin RB-57A Canberras replaced the World War II vintage RB-26s in 1954 to perform night reconnaissance missions. However, engine malfunctions, structural deficiencies and lack of supporting equipment and parts plagued the RB-57A, and the wing soon began to replace them with RB-66s. In 1956, the 10th TRW began to transition to the RB-66 and WB-66 Destroyers, and the RF-84Fs were transferred to the 66th TRW at Phalsbourg-Bourscheid Air Base, France.

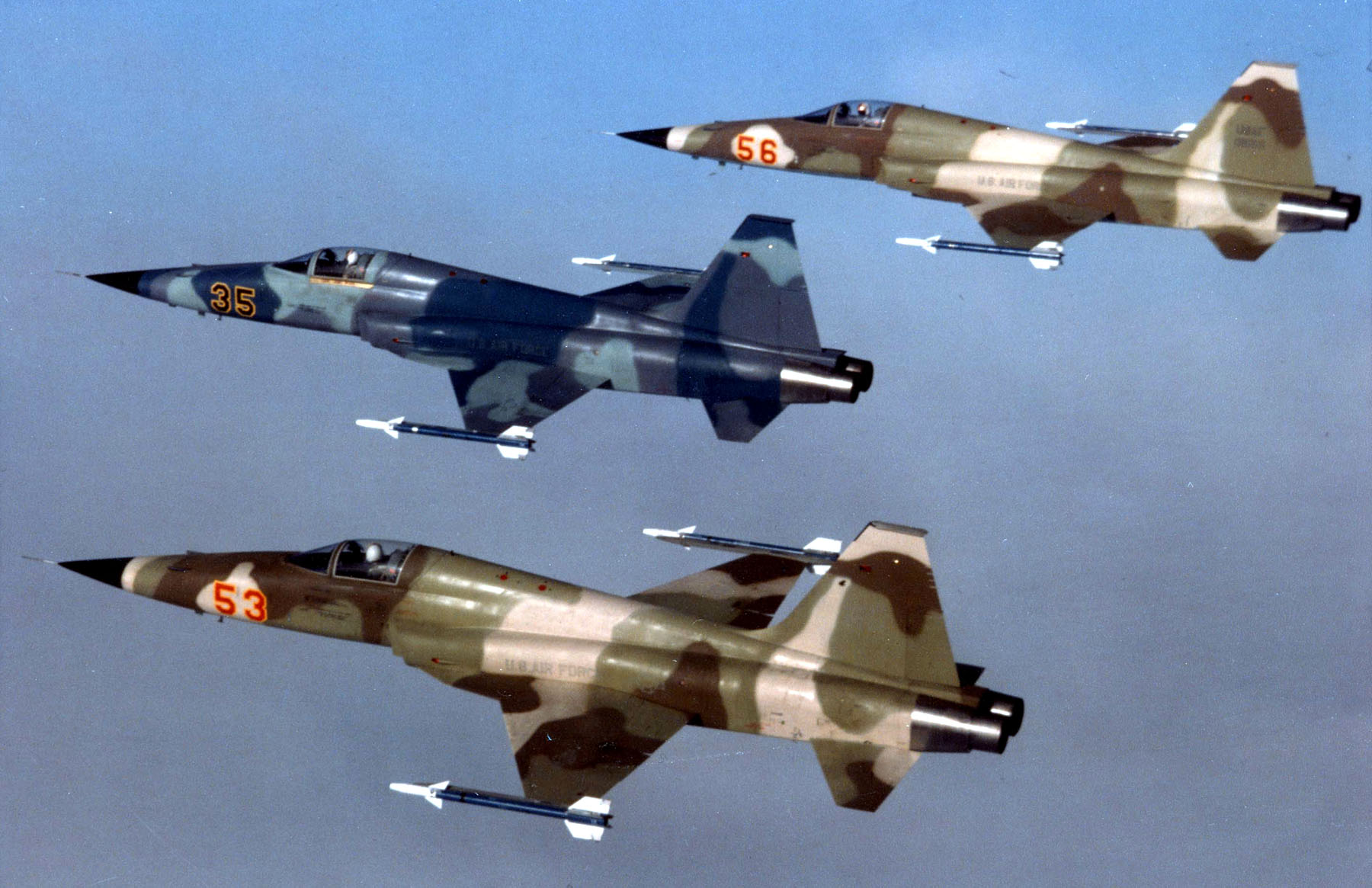
Northrop F-5E Tiger IIs of the 527th TFTAS, 1977

In 1959, France placed new limits on the type of American forces stationed on its soil. Specifically, USAF nuclear-capable aircraft were to be removed from French bases. To accommodate the French restrictions, USAFE moved the 49th TFW from Etain-Rouvres Air Base to Spangdahlem and the 10th TRW was relocated to RAF Alconbury on 20 July 1959.

With its headquarters at RAF Alconbury, the 10 TRW operated its B-66 Destroyers from RAFs Alconbury, RAF Bruntingthorpe, and RAF Chelveston. In addition, the 10th TRW frequently rotated its aircraft to Toul AB, France establishing a detachment there until France's withdrawal from NATO's integrated military in 1965. On 10 March 1964, a wing RB-66B took off from Toul for a mission over West Germany. Because of an equipment malfunction that was undetected by the crew, the plane continued its flight to East Germany and was shot down. The crew ejected safely, but was taken prisoner, although they were released before the end of the month. This incident prompted USAFE to institute a buffer zone, where special procedures were required for aircraft flying near the eastern border of West Germany.

In 1965, the 10 TRW received a new airplane, the RF-4C Phantom II. The wing's mission changed slightly in 1976. It inactivated two of its three RF-4C squadrons. The 527th Tactical Fighter Training Aggressor Squadron, flying F-5E "Tiger IIs", activated at RAF Alconbury 1 April 1976, bringing a new mission to the wing. The squadron provided combat training to North Atlantic Treaty Organization forces by teaching and demonstrating soviet air tactics-under the title of Dissimilar Air Combat Tactics. The 527th flew the first "Aggressor" sortie from RAF Alconbury in May.

=== 10th Tactical Fighter Wing ===
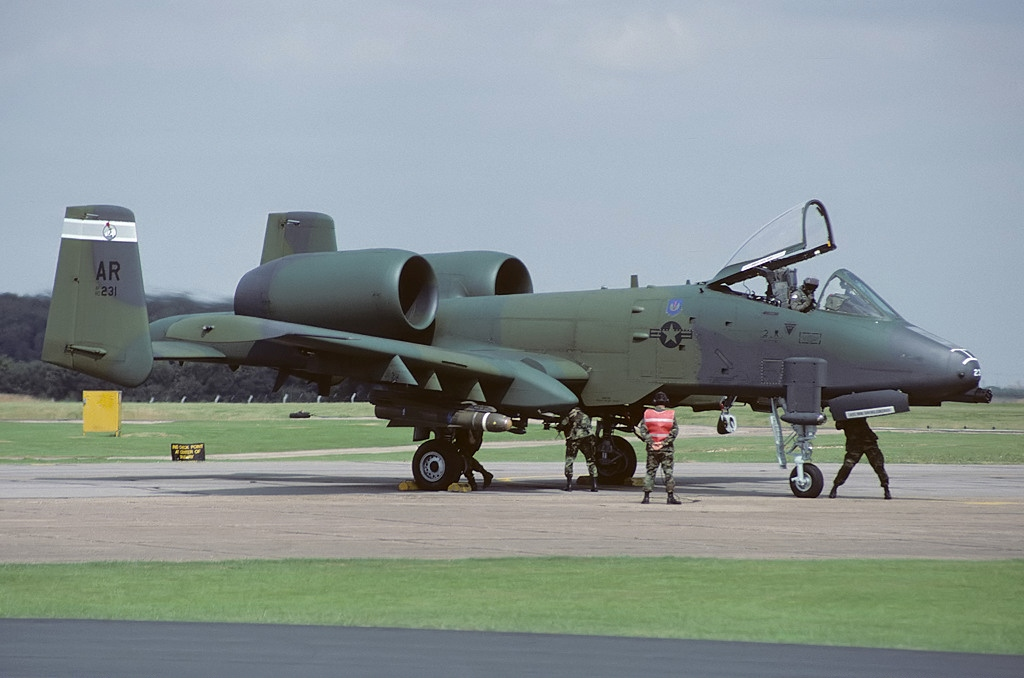
Fairchild A-10A Thunderbolt II, 10th TFW 'AR', August 1988

In the late 1980s, the 10 TRW experienced more dramatic changes. After 34 years with the same mission, the 10 TRW received a new one. This 1st Tactical Reconnaissance Squadron inactivated in June 1987 and its RF-4Cs left the base. On 20 August 1987, the wing was designated as the 10th Tactical Fighter Wing. During 1988, two squadrons of A-10A Thunderbolt IIs, the 509th and 511th Tactical Fighter Squadrons, arrived from RAF Bentwaters/Woodbridge. As the A-10s arrived, the 527th Aggressor Squadron moved to RAF Bentwaters.

Both A-10 flying squadrons, kept a strong close air support vigilance and remained ready to perform their mission in a contingency situation. The 511 TFS deployed to Saudi Arabia in support of Operations DESERT SHIELD/DESERT STORM from December 1990 to June 1991. The wing's A-10s played an important part in the air phase of the Gulf War, attacking tanks, Scud missiles, and other ground positions.

=== 10th Air Base Wing ===
The 10 TFW again went through dramatic changes in the early 1990s. The wing drew down its A-10 mission, September 1991 – March 1992. Without its aircraft, the 10 TFW's mission became installation and community support for U.S. personnel at Alconbury and beyond. The wing was finally redesignated as the 10th Air Base Wing in March 1993, and inactivated October 1994.

The 10th Air Base Wing was reactivated on 1 November 1994 as the support wing for the United States Air Force Academy, Colorado.

The 10 ABW consists of more than 2,100 military, civilian and contract personnel. Its organizational structure consists of:

- 10th Medical Group

10th Aeromedical Squadron (10 AMDS)
10th Dental Squadron (10 DS)
10th Medical Operation Squadron (10 MDOS)
10th Medical Support Squadron (10 MDSS)
10th Surgical Operations Squadron (10 MSGS)

- 10th Mission Support Group

10th Civil Engineer Squadron (10 CES)
10th Communications Squadron (10 CS)
10th Contracting Squadron (10 CONS)
10th Force Support Squadron (10 FSS)
10th Logistics Readiness Squadron (10 LRS)
10th Security Forces Squadron (10 SFS)

== Lineage ==
- Designated as the 10th Reconnaissance Wing on 14 November 1947

Organized on 3 December 1947
Redesignated 10th Tactical Reconnaissance Wing on 25 August 1948
Inactivated on 1 April 1949

- Activated on 10 July 1952

Redesignated 10th Tactical Fighter Wing on 20 August 1987
Redesignated 10th Air Base Wing on 31 March 1993
Inactivated on 1 November 1994
Activated on 1 November 1994

=== Assignments ===
- Ninth Air Force, 3 December 1947
- Fourteenth Air Force, 1 February – 1 April 1949
- Twelfth Air Force, 10 July 1952
- United States Air Forces in Europe, 1 January 1958
- Third Air Force, 25 August 1959
- Seventeenth Air Force, 1 July 1961
- Third Air Force, 1 September 1963 – 1 November 1994
- United States Air Force Academy, since 1 November 1994

=== Components ===
Groups

- 10th Reconnaissance (later, 10th Tactical Reconnaissance) Group: 3 December 1947 – 1 April 1949; 10 July 1952 – 8 December 1957
- 10th Civil Engineer Group: 1 November 1994 – 28 March 2002
- 10th Logistics Group: 1 November 1994 – 199?

Squadrons

- 1st Tactical Reconnaissance Squadron: 8 December 1957 – 15 January 1988
- 32d Tactical Reconnaissance Squadron: 8 December 1957 – 8 March 1958 (detached 8 January – 8 March 1958); 15 August 1966 – 1 January 1976
- 38th Tactical Reconnaissance Squadron: 8 December 1957 – 8 March 1958 (detached 8 January – 8 March 1958)
- 42d Tactical Reconnaissance Squadron: 8 December 1957 – 1 July 1965
- 19th Tactical Reconnaissance Squadron: attached 8 January – 7 March 1958, assigned 8 March 1958 – 1 July 1965
- 30th Reconnaissance Squadron: attached 8 January – 7 March 1958, assigned 8 March 1958 – 1 April 1976
- 45th Tactical Reconnaissance Squadron: attached 13 June – 6 July 1973
- 62d Tactical Reconnaissance Squadron: attached 7–24 March 1976
- 509th Tactical Fighter Squadron: 1 June 1988 – 30 December 1992
- 511th Tactical Fighter Squadron: 1 September 1988 – 30 December 1992 (detached 19 December 1990 – 3 June 1991)
- 527th Tactical Fighter Training Aggressor (later, 527th Aggressor): 1 April 1976 – 14 July 1988.

=== Stations ===
- Pope Field (later Pope Air Force Base), North Carolina, 3 December 1947 – 1 April 1949
- Toul-Rosieres Air Base, France, 10 July 1952 – 9 May 1953 (1st TRS)
  - Note: 32d and 38th TRS deployed at Fürstenfeldbruck Air Base and Neubiberg Air Base, West Germany, 10 July 1952 – 9 May 1953
- Spangdahlem Air Base, West Germany, 10 May 1953 – 25 August 1959
- RAF Alconbury, Cambridgeshire, United Kingdom, 26 August 1959 – 1 November 1994
- United States Air Force Academy, Colorado, since 1 November 1994

== Aircraft ==
- RB-66C Destroyer, 1957–1965
- RF-101C Voodoo, 1957–1966
- RF-4C Phantom, 1965–1987
- F-5E Tiger II, 1976–1988
- A-10 Thunderbolt II, 1987–1992

== Awards and decorations ==
Air Force Outstanding Unit Awards:

- 31 December 1959 – 1 January 1962
- 6 January 1972 – 6 January 1973
- 15 November 1977 – 14 November 1979
- 6 January 1985 – 31 May 1987
- 6 January 1989 – 31 May 1991
- 6 January 1991 – 30 May 1992
- 6 January 1992 – 31 May 1994
- 11 January 1994 – 31 October 1995
- 11 January 1995 – 31 October 1996
- 11 January 1996 – 31 October 1998
- 11 January 1998 – 31 October 2000
- 1 January 2010 – 31 December 2010
- 1 January 2013 – 31 December 2014

- Subordinate components of the wing:
- 10th Tactical Reconnaissance Wing, Headquarters, 15 July 1968 – 15 July 1969
- 10th Tactical Fighter Wing Clinic, 6 January 1989 – 31 May 1991
- 10th Tactical Fighter Wing, Detachment 3, 6 January 1989 – 31 May 1991
- 10th Tactical Fighter Wing Clinic, 6 January 1991 – 30 May 1992
- 10th Air Base Wing Logistics Division, 11 January 1995 – 31 October 1996

== List of commanders ==
No.	Commander		Term		
No.	Portrait	Name	Took office	Left office	Term length
-	Stacey Hawkins	Colonel; Stacey Hawkins	June 2013	May 14, 2015	~1 year, 347 days
-	Troy E. Dunn	Colonel; Troy E. Dunn	May 14, 2015	June 20, 2017	2 years, 37 days
-	Shawn W. Campbell	Colonel; Shawn W. Campbell	June 20, 2017	June 17, 2019	1 year, 362 days
-	Brian S. Hartless	Colonel; Brian S. Hartless	June 17, 2019	June 18, 2021	2 years, 1 day
-	Christopher J. Leonard	Colonel; Christopher J. Leonard	June 18, 2021	~July 5, 2023	2 years, 17 days
-	Amy M. Glisson	Colonel; Amy M. Glisson	~July 5, 2023	Incumbent	~3 years, 119 days

== Bibliography ==
- Endicott, Judy G. (1998). Active Air Force Wings as of 1 October 1995 and USAF Active Flying, Space, and Missile Squadrons as of 1 October 1995 (PDF). Air Force History and Museums Program. Washington, DC: Office of Air Force History. ASIN B000113MB2.
- Knaack, Marcelle Size (1988). Encyclopedia of US Air Force Aircraft and Missile Systems. Vol. 2, Post-World War II Bombers 1945–1973. Washington, DC: Office of Air Force History. ISBN 0-912799-59-5.

Further reading

- Fletcher, Harry R (1993). Air Force Bases, Vol. II, Air Bases Outside the United States of America (PDF). Washington, DC: Center for Air Force History. ISBN 0-912799-53-6. Archived from the original (PDF) on 20 December 2016.
- Martin, Patrick (1994). Tail Code: The Complete History of USAF Tactical Aircraft Tail Code Markings. Atglen, PA: Schiffer Military Aviation History. ISBN 0-88740-513-4.
- Ravenstein, Charles A. (1984). Air Force Combat Wings, Lineage & Honors Histories 1947-1977. Washington, DC: Office of Air Force History. ISBN 0-912799-12-9.
