= 10th Tactical Reconnaissance Group =

- F-6 Mustang of the 15th TRS at St. Dizier Airfield, Autumn 1944. This aircraft was flown by Captain John H. Hoefker, who became the 10th PRG's first ace, with credits of 8 1/2 air victories.
- Active: 1941–1949; 1952–1957
- Country: United States
- Branch: United States Air Force
- Type: Combat Group
- Role: Tactical Reconnaissance
- Part of: 10th Tactical Reconnaissance Wing; United States Air Forces in Europe
- Motto: ARGUS – Ceaseless Watch
- Engagements: World War II (EAME Theater): Air Offensive, Europe; Normandy Campaign; Northern France Campaign; Rhineland Campaign; Ardennes-Alsace Campaign; Central Europe Campaign

- Decorations: Distinguished Unit Citation: France, 6–20 May 1944

Insignia
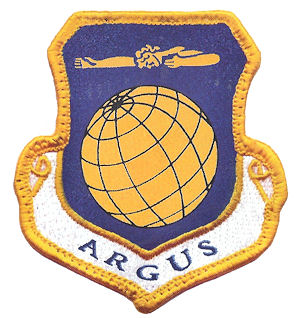
- 10th Tactical Reconnaissance Group Emblem

The 10th Tactical Reconnaissance Group is an inactive United States Air Force unit. Its last assignment was to the 10th Tactical Reconnaissance Wing, stationed at Spangdahlem Air Base, West Germany. It was inactivated on 8 December 1957.

== History ==
=== World War II ===
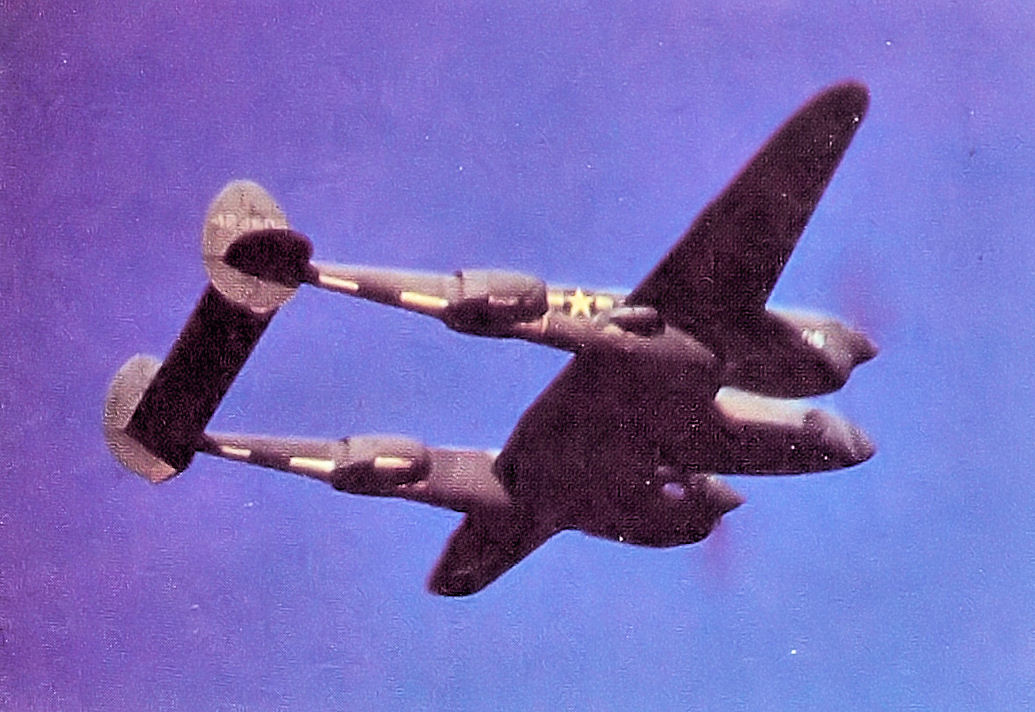
31st Photographic Reconnaissance Squadron F-5E Lightning "Sexy Sail"

The 10th Tactical Reconnaissance Group's origins begin as the 73rd Observation Group, being constituted on 21 August 1941. The 73d was activated on 1 September 1941 and assigned to First Air Force. Engaged in training activities, participating in the Tennessee Maneuvers at Camp Campbell, Kentucky in 1943. Underwent several re-designations as Reconnaissance group, then Tactical Reconnaissance Group. Equipped variously with A-20 Havocs; P-40 Warhawks; P-51 Mustangs as well as L-1 and L-4 light observation aircraft. After the end of the maneuvers, conducted movement to Key Field, Mississippi, in preparation for overseas movement.

Reassigned to Third Air Force in December 1943 and redesignated as 10th Photographic Group (Reconnaissance) in December 1943.

The group deployed overseas to the European theater, January–February 1944, for duty with Ninth Air Force at RAF Chalgrove, England. At Chalgrove, the group consisted of six photographic squadrons flying a variety of reconnaissance aircraft. These were the photographic versions of the P-38 Lightning (F-5) and P-51 Mustang (F-6). In addition the unit also flew the Stinson L-1 Vigilant and L-5 Sentinel along with the Piper L-4 Grasshopper light observation aircraft. It photographed airfields, coastal defenses, ports, and made bomb-damage assessment photographs of airfields, marshaling yards, bridges, and other targets in preparation for the Normandy invasion. The 10th PRG received a Distinguished Unit Citation for flying at low altitude to photograph the English Channel coast from Blankenberge to Dunkirk and from Le Touquet to Saint-Vaast-la-Hougue prior to the D-Day invasion during 6–20 May 1944.

In May 1944 the 30th PRS moved to RAF Middle Wallop and it was replaced by the 423rd Night Fighter Squadron with A-20 Havocs (F-3A) from RAF Charmy Down which was used for night photo reconnaissance.

The group supported the Normandy invasion in June by making visual and photographic reconnaissance of bridges, artillery, road and railway junctions, traffic centres, airfields, and other targets. A deployment re-appraisal in June 1944 led to the decision to assign a tactical recon squadron to support the needs of the ground forces on the continent. To this end, the group's 15th Tactical Reconnaissance Squadron (15th TRS) was transferred in from RAF Middle Wallop on 27 June flying F-6 (P-51) Mustangs. The mission of the 15th TRS was to fly low level missions whereas the F-5 Lightnings would fly at higher altitudes.

After the invasion the 15th TRS moved into France first at the end of June 1944, to the Advanced Landing Ground (ALG A-9) at LeMolay, France, then to Rennes – St-Jacques, France (ALG A-27) on 10 August. The other squadrons of the 10th moved over the next few days, the last being the 155th which moved to France in mid-August.

On the continent, the 10th PRG aided the US Third Army and other Allied organizations in the battle to breach the Siegfried Line, September–December 1944. The group participated in the Battle of the Bulge, December 1944 – January 1945, by flying reconnaissance missions in the combat zone. From February 1945 to V-E Day, the 10th RG assisted the advance of Third Army across the Rhine, to Czechoslovakia and into Austria, eventually being stationed at Fürth, Germany (ALG R-30) when hostilities ended.

=== Cold War ===
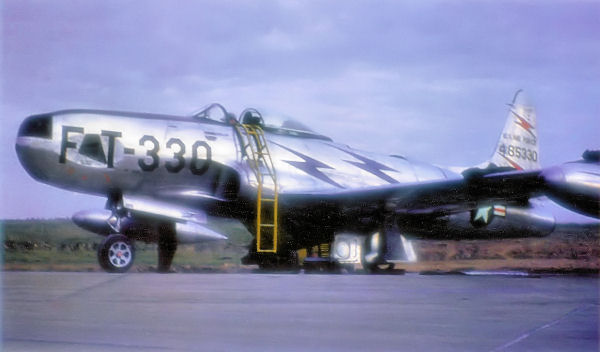
RF-80A Shooting Star of the 38th TRS

The 10th remained in Germany after the war as part of the army of occupation, being assigned to United States Air Forces in Europe. It was transferred without personnel or equipment back to the United States in June 1947, becoming part of Tactical Air Command at Langley AFB, Virginia.

The unit was re-manned and assigned to Lawson Field in Georgia where it was assigned F-6 (P-51) Mustangs in September to its 1st and 15th Tactical Reconnaissance Squadrons. It was redesignated as the 10th Tactical Reconnaissance Group in June 1947 and reassigned to Pope Field, North Carolina in September.

The Air Force started a "wing-base" service test in 1947. Under this program the 10th Reconnaissance Wing was organized 3 December 1947, at Pope Field. The new wing was assigned the 10th Reconnaissance Group as its operational flying component. On 25 August 1948, the 10th Reconnaissance Wing was redesignated the 10th Tactical Reconnaissance Wing (10 TRW), with its component group also being redesignated.

The 10th conducted training at Pope, primarily with army units at Fort Bragg until 1 April 1949 when, due to budget restrictions, the unit was inactivated.

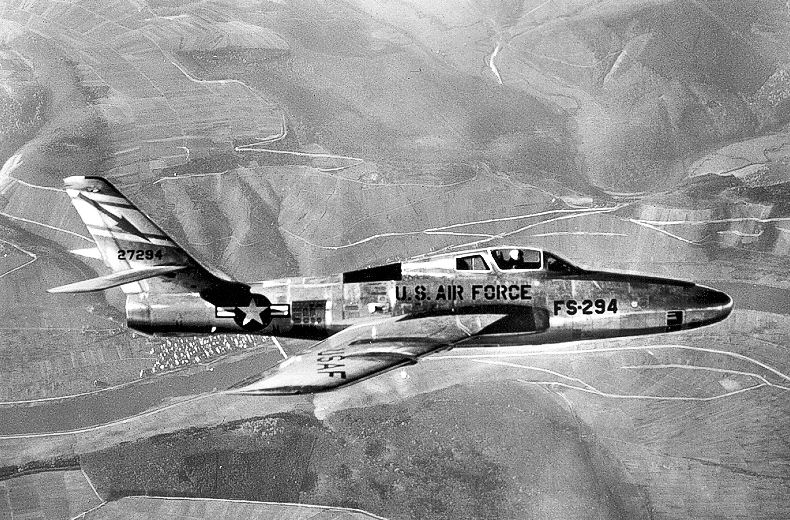
RF-84F Thunderflash of the 10th Reconnaissance Group

On 10 July 1952 as a result of the United States Cold War military buildup in Europe, the 10 TRG was reactivated and assigned to NATO at Toul-Rosières Air Base, France, absorbing the mission and equipment of the inactivating federalized Air National Guard 117th TRG.

However, the base was not yet ready for jet aircraft, so only the 10th TRW Wing Headquarters was sent to Toul. The 10th TRG's propeller-driven RB-26 Invaders of the former 112th TRS were absorbed by the 1st TRS at Toul (which was deemed acceptable for propeller-driven aircraft), while the two jet RF-80A squadrons assigned to the 32d and 38th TRS were located at Neubiberg and Fürstenfeldbruck Air Bases near Munich, West Germany. Group Headquarters was initially assigned to Fürstenfeldbruck, then later moved to Toul in November.

Ongoing construction delays in France forced the 10th TRW's transfer on 9 May 1953 to the newly completed Spangdahlem AB in West Germany where all the squadrons of the Wing and its component groups were finally united.

The Republic RF-84F Thunderflash began to arrive in the fall of 1955, and the RF-80As were returned to the United States for Air National Guard use. Martin RB-57A Canberras replaced the World War II vintage RB-26s in 1954 to perform night Reconnaissance missions. In 1956, the 10th TRG began to transition to the RB-66 and WB-66 Destroyers, and the RF-84Fs were transferred to the 66th TRG at Phalsbourg-Bourscheid Air Base, France.

On 8 December 1957 the 10th Tactical Reconnaissance Group was inactivated with its component squadrons, personnel and equipment being assigned directly to the wing.

== Lineage ==
- Constituted as the 73d Observation Group on 21 August 1941

Activated on 1 September 1941.
Redesignated 73d Reconnaissance Group in April 1943
Redesignated 73d Tactical Reconnaissance Group in August 1943
Redesignated 10th Photographic Group (Reconnaissance) in December 1943
Redesignated 10th Reconnaissance Group in June 1945
Redesignated 10th Tactical Reconnaissance Group in June 1948
Inactivated on 1 April 1949.

- Activated on 10 July 1952

Inactivated on 8 December 1957

=== Assignments ===
- First Air Force, 1 September 1941
- Third Air Force, November 1943 – January 1944
- XIX Tactical Air Command, February 1944 – June 1947
- Continental Air Forces, 25 June 1947
- 10th Reconnaissance Wing (later 10 Tactical Reconnaissance) Wing): 3 December 1947 – 1 April 1949; 10 July 1952 – 8 December 1957

=== Components ===
World War II

20th Photographic Interpretation Division (dates unsure)

- 3d Observation Squadron, 12 March – 12 August 1942
- 5th Photographic Reconnaissance Squadron, 12 March – 10 May 1942
- 12th Observation (later Reconnaissance) Squadron: 1 September 1941 – 21 January 1942
- 14th Observation (later Liaison) Squadron: 7 May – 11 August 1943
- 15th Reconnaissance (formerly Observation) Squadron: 12 March 1942 – 30 December 1943, 13 June 1944 – 24 June 1945
- 16th Observation Squadron: 1 September 1941 – 12 March 1942.
- 22d Observation Squadron: 1 September 1941 – 12 March 1942.
- 30th Photographic Reconnaissance Squadron: 21 Feb 44 – ?
- 31st Photographic Reconnaissance Squadron: 31 March 1944 – 22 November 1945
- 33d Photographic Reconnaissance Squadron: 1 May – 13 August 1944
- 34th Photographic Reconnaissance Squadron: 31 March 1944 – 22 November 1945
- 36th (formerly 28th) Reconnaissance Squadron: 17 July 1942 – 9 October 1943
- 37th Photographic Mapping Squadron: 27 June – 9 October 1943
- 39th Photographic Reconnaissance Squadron: 28 February – 30 March 1945
- 91st Reconnaissance Squadron: 1 September 1941 – June 1943
- 111th Reconnaissance Squadron: 2 July – 15 December 1945
- 152d Observation Squadron: 1943
- 155th (formerly 423d, later 45th) Reconnaissance Squadron: 17 May 1944 – 18 February 1945, 24 November 1945 – 15 May 1947
- 160th Tactical Reconnaissance Squadron: 15 November 1945 – 25 June 1947
- 162d Tactical Reconnaissance Squadron: 22–25 April 1945.

Cold War

- 1st Reconnaissance (later Tactical Reconnaissance) Squadron: 8 September 1947 – 1 April 1949; 10 July 1952 – 8 December 1957
- 15th Reconnaissance Squadron (Photographic): 24 Jul-3 Dec 1947
- 15th Tactical Reconnaissance Squadron: 3 December 1947 – 1 April 1949
- 30th Reconnaissance (later Tactical Reconnaissance) Squadron: 21 February – 13 June 1944; attached 8 January – 8 December 1957
- 32d Tactical Reconnaissance Squadron: 10 July 1952 – 8 December 1957
- 38th Tactical Reconnaissance Squadron: 10 July 1952 – 8 December 1957
- 42d Tactical Reconnaissance Squadron: 10 July 1952 – 8 December 1957

=== Stations ===
- Olmsted Field, Pennsylvania 1 September 1941 – 6 November 1941
- Godman Field, Kentucky 7 November 1941 – 22 June 1943
- Fort Campbell Army Air Field, Kentucky 23 June 1943 – November 1943
- Key Field, Mississippi, November 1943 – January 1944
- RAF Chalgrove (Station 465), England, February 1944 – 10 August 1944
- Rennes/St-Jacques Airfield (A-27), France, 11 August 1944 – September 1944
- St-Dizier Airfield (A-64), France, September 1944 – November 1944
- Chateaudun Airfield (A-39), France, November 1944
- Conflans/Doncourt Airfield (A-94), France, November 1944 – March 1945
- Trier/Evren Airfield (Y-57), Germany, March 1945 – 4 April 1945
- Ober Olm Airfield (Y-64), Germany, 5 April 1945 – 27 April 1945
- Fürth Airfield (R-28), Germany 28 April 1945 – June 1947
- Fürstenfeldbruck Air Base, Germany, April – June 1947
- Langley Field, Virginia, 25 June 1947
- Lawson Field, Georgia, c. 8 September 1947
- Pope Field (later Pope Air Force Base), North Carolina, c. 27 September 1947 – 1 April 1949
- Fürstenfeldbruck Air Base, West Germany, 10 July 1952
- Toul-Rosières Air Base, France, November 1952
- Spangdahlem Air Base, West Germany, May 1953 – 8 December 1957.

== Aircraft ==
- A-20/F-3 Havoc, 1943–1945
- P-38/F-5 Lightning, 1943–1947
- P-51/F-6 Mustang, 1943–1947; 1947–1949
- L-1 Vigilant, 1941–1943
- L-4 Grasshopper, 1941–1945
- L-5 Sentinel, 1941–1945
- RB-26 Invader, 1952–1954
- RF-80 Shooting Star, 1952–1955
- RB-57A Canberra, 1954–1957
- RF-84F Thunderstreak, 1955–1957
- RB-66C Destroyer, 1956–1957
