= 21st Expeditionary Reconnaissance Squadron =

21st Expeditionary Reconnaissance Squadron

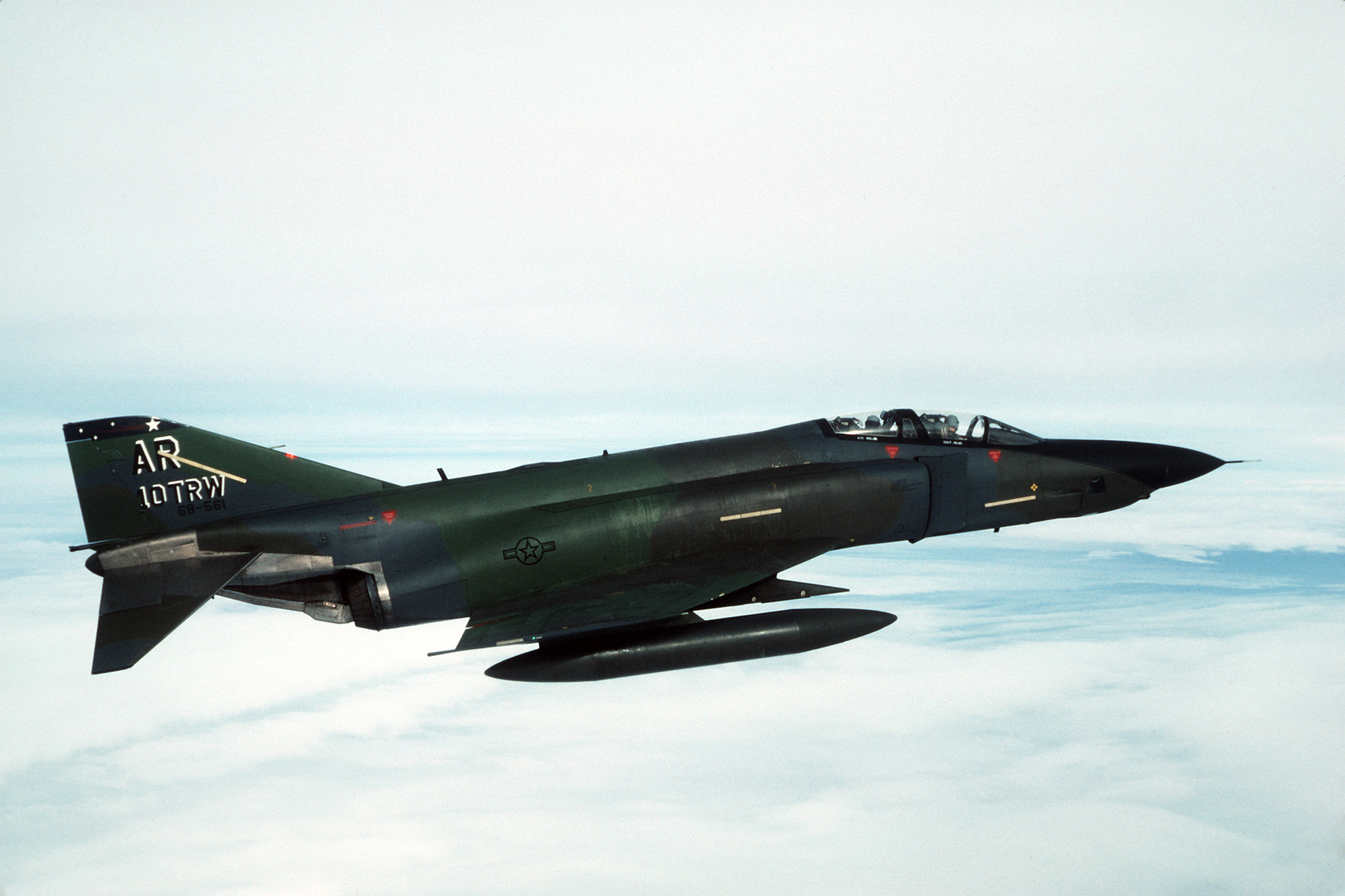
- Squadron RF-4C Phantom II
- Active: 1942–1944; 1945–1988; 2007–2008
- Country: United States
- Branch: United States Air Force
- Role: Reconnaissance
- Decorations: Air Force Outstanding Unit Award

Insignia
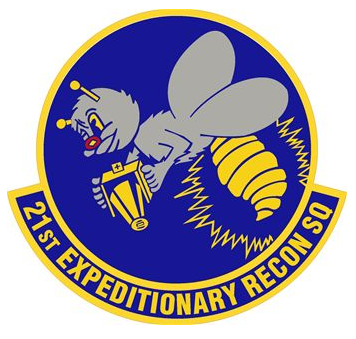
- 21st Expeditionary Reconnaissance Squadron emblem (approved 20 November 2010)

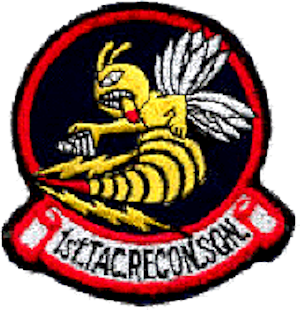
- Patch with 1st Tactical Reconnaissance Squadron emblem

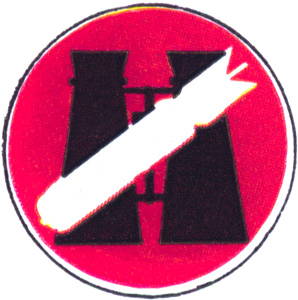
- 21st Observation Squadron emblem (approved 12 June 1943)

The 21st Expeditionary Reconnaissance Squadron is a provisional United States Air Force unit, assigned to United States Air Forces Europe to activate or inactivate as needed. Its last known location was at Souda Bay, Greece.

The squadron was active as the 21st Tactical Reconnaissance Squadron, and served as a reconnaissance Replacement Training Unit during World War II until being disbanded in a reorganization of the United States Army Air Forces designed to make the most efficient use of resources to free manpower for overseas assignment.

The 1st Tactical Reconnaissance Squadron was formed shortly after the end of the war and served as part of the occupation forces in Germany until 1947, when it returned to the United States, where it was inactivated in 1949. The squadron was reactivated in 1952 to replace the 160th Tactical Reconnaissance Squadron, an Alabama Air National Guard unit. It remained in Europe as an element of the 10th Tactical Reconnaissance Wing (later 10th Tactical Fighter Wing) until it was inactivated on 15 January 1988.

The two squadrons were consolidated in 1985. In 2007, the consolidated squadron was converted to provisional status as the 21st Expeditionary Reconnaissance Squadron and assigned to United States Air Forces Europe, which activated it at Souda Bay, Greece.

== History ==
=== World War II ===
The squadron was first established during World War II as the 21st Tactical Reconnaissance Squadron and served as a Replacement Training Unit (RTU). RTUs were oversized units whose mission was to train individual pilots or aircrews. The squadron was stationed at several airfields in the Midwest and Southeast as part of Third Air Force. It initially trained crews for medium bombers used as reconnaissance aircraft, but changed its mission to focus on training reconnaissance pilots for overseas duty.

However, the United States Army Air Forces found that standard military units, based on relatively inflexible tables of organization, were less well adapted to the training mission. Accordingly, it adopted a more functional system in which each base was organized into a separate numbered unit. As a result, the squadron was disbanded in 1944 and replaced by the 347th AAF Base Unit (Replacement Training Unit, Tactical Reconnaissance).

=== Occupation of Germany and Post War ===
The 1st Tactical Reconnaissance Squadron was organized after the end of the war and served in the occupation of Germany It was equipped with a variety of transport aircraft (C-45, C-47, UC-64) until it moved to Fürth Air Base, Germany where it began transition to North American P-51 Mustangs.

The squadron moved to the United States and became part of Tactical Air Command in 1947 at Langley Field, Virginia, then moved to Lawson Field, Georgia without personnel or equipment near Fort Benning where it equipped with F-6D (later RF-51D) Mustangs. The unit moved to Pope Field, North Carolina in September. It flew aerial mapping and reconnaissance missions, largely over the mid-Atlantic region, supporting Army forces at Fort Bragg during maneuvers. It was inactivated in 1949 due to budget restrictions.

=== Cold War Service With United States Air Forces Europe ===
The squadron was reactivated as a night Tactical Reconnaissance Squadron in France in 1952 to replace an Alabama Air National Guard tactical reconnaissance squadron which had been federalized and brought to active duty in the buildup of forces during the Korean War. The RB-26s were repainted black and the squadron was assigned a night reconnaissance mission supporting United States Army and North Atlantic Treaty Organization ground forces in West Germany.

In May 1953 the squadron moved to Spangdahlem Air Base, West Germany as part of a United States Air Forces Europe reorganization. The World War II-era RB-26s began to be replaced in October 1954 by Martin RB-57A Canberras, again painted black for night reconnaissance missions, although some Invaders remained through 1956. In 1957 the RB-57s were transferred to Châteauroux-Déols Air Depot for shipment back to the United States and the 1st TRS was re-equipped with the Douglas RB-66C Destroyer.

The squadron moved to RAF Alconbury, England in 1959 when the 47th Bombardment Wing's B-45s were retired, and Spangdalem became a tactical fighter base. It continued operating the RB-66Cs for night reconnaissance, although rotated frequently to Toul Air Base until 1966 where its parent 10th TRW operated a forward location. (Note: The Toul operation was designated as Detachment 1, 10th Tactical Reconnaissance Wing. "Abstract, History 10 Tactical Reconnaissance Wing Jul–Dec 1960". Air Force History Index.) In 1966 it converted to the RF-4C Phantom II upon its introduction to USAFE. The squadron flew the RF-4C for over 20 years from Alconbury, and from RAF Wethersfield, (Note: During the 1970s, the squadron was split between Alconbury and nearby Wethersfield, although it officially remained at Alconbury. "Abstract, History 1 Tactical Reconnaissance Squadron Jan–Sep 1970". Air Force History Index.) frequently participating in NATO exercises.

The unit was consolidated with the 21st Tactical Reconnaissance Squadron in 1985 to give the squadron a World War II history. The squadron became non-operational on 16 June 1987 with the withdrawal of the RF-4C from Europe, and was inactivated in 1988 when the 10th TRW transitioned to a Fairchild Republic A-10 tactical fighter wing.

== Lineage ==
21st Tactical Reconnaissance Squadron

Constituted as 21st Observation Squadron (Light) on 5 February 1942
Activated on 2 March 1942
Redesignated 21st Observation Squadron on 4 July 1942
Redesignated 21st Reconnaissance Squadron (Bomber) on 2 April 1943
Redesignated 21st Tactical Reconnaissance Squadron on 11 August 1943
Disbanded on 1 May 1944.

- Reconstituted on 19 September 1985 and consolidated with the 1st Tactical Reconnaissance Squadron as the 1st Tactical Reconnaissance Squadron on 21 Sep 1985

21st Expeditionary Reconnaissance Squadron

- Constituted 5 November 1945 as 1st Tactical Reconnaissance Squadron

Activated 6 December 1945
Inactivated on 1 Apr 1949
Redesignated 1st Tactical Reconnaissance Squadron, Night-Photographic, 25 June 1952
Activated on 10 July 1952
Redesignated 1st Tactical Reconnaissance Squadron, Night, Photo-Jet on 1 May 1959
Redesignated 1st Tactical Reconnaissance Squadron on 1 October 1966

- Consolidated with the 21st Tactical Reconnaissance Squadron on 19 September 1985

Inactivated on 15 Jan 1988

- Redesignated 21st Expeditionary Reconnaissance Squadron and converted to provisional status on 10 August 2007

Activated on 8 October 2007
Inactivated c. 9 September 2008

=== Assignments ===
- Air Force Combat Command (later Army Air Forces), 2 Mar 1942
- 75th Observation (later Reconnaissance; Tactical Reconnaissance) Group, 12 March 1942 – 1 May 1944.
- 10th Tactical Reconnaissance Group, 14 December 1945 – 1 April 1949
- 10th Tactical Reconnaissance Group, 10 July 1952
- 10th Tactical Reconnaissance Wing (later 10th Tactical Fighter Wing), 8 December 1957 – 15 January 1988
- United States Air Forces Europe to activate or inactivate anytime after 10 August 2007

401st Air Expeditionary Group, 8 October 2007
100th Operations Group (attached), 9 September 2008

=== Stations ===
- Langley Field, Virginia, 2 March 1942
- Kellogg Field, Michigan, 9 March 1942
- Will Rogers Field, Oklahoma, 30 August 1942
- William Northern Field, Tennessee, 12 March 1943
- Key Field, Mississippi, 19 August 1943 – 1 May 1944
- Criel, France, 14 December 1945
- Istres-Le Tubé Air Base, France, 13 January 1946
- Compiègne, France, 30 March 1946
- Fürth Air Base, Germany, 12 September 1946 – ca. 20 June 1947
- Langley Field, Virginia, 25 June 1947
- Lawson Field, Georgia, 8 September 1947
- Pope Field (later Pope Air Force Base), North Carolina, 27 September 1947 – 1 April 1949
- Toul Rosieres AB, France, 1 July 1952
- Spangdahlem Air Base, West Germany, 10 May 1953
- RAF Alconbury, England, 26 August 1959 – 15 January 1988
- Souda Bay, Greece, 8 October 2007 – c. 9 September 2008

=== Aircraft ===
- L-4 and evidently 0-47, 1942, 1943
- Douglas A-20 Havoc, 1942–1943
- North American B-25 Mitchell, 1942–1943
- Bell P-39 Airacobra 1942–1943, 1943–1944
- Curtiss P-40 Warhawk 1942–1943, 1943–1944
- Noorduyn UC-64 Norseman, 1945–1946
- Beech C-45 Expeditor, 1945–1946
- Douglas C-47 Skytrain, 1945–1946
- F-6D/RF-51D Mustang, 1942–1943, 1943–1944, 1946–1947, 1947–1949
- Douglas RB-26 Invader, 1952–1954
- Martin RB-57 Canberra, 1954–1957
- Douglas RB-66C Destroyer, 1957–1966
- McDonnell Douglas RF-4C Phantom II, 1966–1988
