= Toul-Rosières Air Base =

Former U.S. Air Force and French Air Force base

- Near Rosières-en-Haye in France

Site information
- Type: Former air force base
- Operator: US Air Force (1952-1967); French Air Force (1967-2004)

Location
- Coordinates: 48°46′57″N 5°58′53″E

Site history
- Built: 1916
- In use: 1916 – 2004

Airfield information
- Identifiers: ICAO: LFSL
Runways
Direction	Length and surface
	Concrete

Toul-Rosières Air Base (French: Base aérienne 136 Toul-Rosières) is a former United States Air Force and French Air Force installation near Rosières-en-Haye, eastern France. The base was closed in 2004 and is now the site of the Toul-Rosières Solar Park.

== History ==
=== World War I ===
An aerodrome was operational on the site from 1916.

In late April 1918, the 462d Aero Squadron helped build the 2nd Day Bombardment Group airdrome at Rosières-en-Haye, consisting of 27 French barracks, 14 Nissen huts and 15 Bessonneau hangars. A force of 200 Moroccan laborers helped level the airfield.

=== World War II ===
From 21 November 1944, the United States Army Air Force 354th Fighter Group operated from the base. The field was designated by the code A98 and known as Rosières-en-Haye and was equipped with a 1,500 meter PSP runway. The base was returned to the French authorities on 22 May 1945.

=== Postwar USAFE usage ===
In 1951, as the Soviet threat in Europe increased, NATO decided to build many modern air bases in West Germany and France. The Toul-Rosières site was chosen for the construction of a base for United States Air Forces in Europe (USAFE), in particular because of the long American history there. The construction was planned in two phases. The first consisted of the construction of a temporary base to base USAFE flying units as quickly as possible. The construction of modern infrastructure was then planned in a second phase, led by architects Pierre Dufau and Grad Seelye. Work began in February 1951 with the installation of a railway line to supply the base. The old PSP runway was replaced in November 1951 by a concrete runway. The earthworks for the construction of the base were carried out by the 15th Air Engineer Regiment in 1952. The 7412th Support Squadron was activated at Toul-Rosières in December 1951 to coordinate the construction of the new base.

==== 117th Tactical Reconnaissance Wing ====
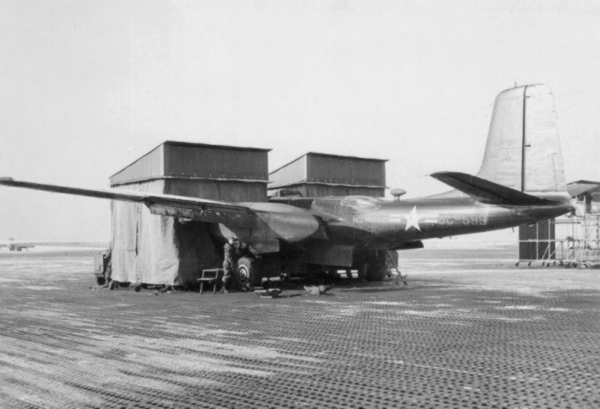
117th TRW RB-26C in a temporary nose "hangar" at Toul, January 1953

The 117th Tactical Reconnaissance Wing left Lawson Air Force Base in Georgia to settle in Toul on 27 January 1952. The 117th TRW was made up of three squadrons: the 160th Tactical Reconnaissance Squadron (TRS) of the Alabama Air National Guard, the 157th TRS of the South Carolina Air National Guard and the 112th TRS of the Ohio Air National Guard. The 112th TRS was equipped with 15 Douglas RB-26C Invaders while the 157th and 160th TRS flew 38 RF-80As. Each squadron also had a T-33A liaison and training aircraft. The RB-26s were used for night reconnaissance missions while the RF-80s were limited to daylight missions.

When the 117th TRW arrived at TRAB (the nickname given to the base), the base was a mud field. So the wing commander, deeming the situation dangerous for air operations, decided to transfer the flying squadrons to bases in West Germany, until TRAB was completed. The 157th TRS moved to Fürstenfeldbruck Air Base and the 160th TRS to Neubiberg Air Base. The command and support units of the 117th remained at TRAB. The 112th TRS left with its RB-26s for Wiesbaden Air Base where it remained until July 1952, when it returned, for a short time, to TRAB. The 117th TRW was withdrawn from active service on 9 July 1952.

==== 10th Tactical Reconnaissance Wing ====
The 10th Tactical Reconnaissance Wing (10th TRW) was activated at TRAB on 10 July 1952. It absorbed the equipment and personnel of the defunct 117th TRW. The 112th TRS became the 1st Tactical Reconnaissance Squadron, the 157th TRS the 32nd Tactical Reconnaissance Squadron and the 160th TRS the 38th Tactical Reconnaissance Squadron. The 32nd and 38th TRS remained with their RF-80s at Furstenfeldbruck and Neubiberg.

As a result of one of USAFE's many reorganizations, the 10th TRW was transferred to Spangdahlem Air Base, West Germany in May 1953. US Army engineering units also moved to the base to finish, with French companies, the construction of the base.

==== 465th Troop Carrier Wing ====
The 465th Troop Carrier Wing, which had been activated at Donaldson Air Force Base in February 1953, moved to TRAB in November 1953 with its three squadrons: the 780th, 781st and 782nd Troop Carrier Squadrons. The 465th TCW, which was assigned to the Twelfth Air Force and attached to the 322nd Air Division (Combat Cargo), flew 56 C-119s plus a few C-47s and L-20As for support.

As the work on TRAB was not completed, on their arrival in Europe, the squadrons were temporarily based in West Germany: the 780th was at Rhein-Main Air Base, the 781st at Wiesbaden Air Base and the 782nd at Neubiberg Air Base. They finally settled in TRAB in April-May 1954. The 465th TCW left TRAB for good on 23 May 1955 to take up residence at Evreux-Fauville Air Base. The 7430th Air Base Squadron was then activated to take charge of the TRAB, which was put on standby. The 7430th ABS operated a C-47 and an L-20A Beaver.

==== 312th and 366th Fighter Bomber Wings ====
Between 1954 and 1955, North American F-86H Sabres from the 312th Fighter Bomber Wing from Clovis Air Force Base, New Mexico and the 366th Fighter Bomber Wing at Alexandria Air Force Base, Louisiana flew rotations to TRAB. Lieutenant colonel John B. England, commander of the 389th Fighter-Bomber Squadron of the 366th FBW, was killed in the crash of his F-86H while landing in bad weather.

==== 50th Fighter Bomber Wing/Tactical Fighter Wing ====
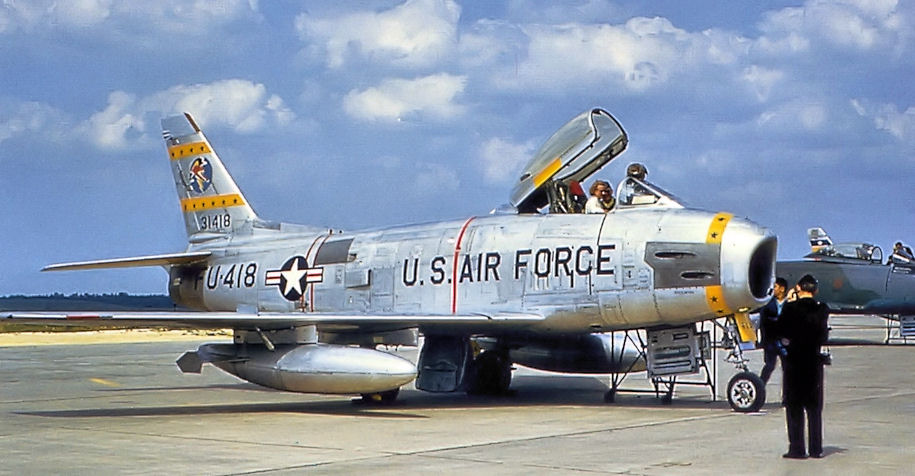
81st FBS F-86H at Toul

The 50th Fighter-Bomber Wing left Hahn Air Base on 17 July 1956 to relocate to TRAB. The 10th, 81st and 417th Fighter-Bomber Squadrons that made up the 50th FBW were equipped with 74 F-86H Sabres supplemented by C-47, L-20A and T-33A support aircraft. The 50th FBW's main mission was tactical nuclear attack.

From May 1957, the F-86s were replaced by 75 North American F-100D/F Super Sabres.

In 1959, the French government requested the removal from French soil of all foreign nuclear delivery systems and weapons, the 50th, which had been renamed the 50th Tactical Fighter Wing, had to leave France. The 50th TFW departed TRAB on 10 December 1960 to return to Hahn AB.

The 7514th Support Group was activated from the 50th TFW to guard TAB as well as the bases at Chambley, Chaumont, Etain and Phalsbourg. The 7514th became the 7544th Support Group on 1 January 1960.

==== Detachment 1, 10th Tactical Reconnaissance Wing ====
On 10 October 1959, the 32nd and 38th Tactical Reconnaissance Squadrons belonging to the 10th TRW at RAF Alconbury were assigned to TRAB to form Detachment 1, 10th TRW.

RB-66Cs of the 32nd and 38th TRS based at RAF Alconbury, RAF Bruntingthorpe and RAF Chelveston flew two to four month rotations TRAB.

The aircraft of the 1st and 19th TRS joined those of the other two squadrons in the rotations that lasted until October 1965 and the activation of the 25th Tactical Reconnaissance Wing (to which the 19th TRS was attached) at Chambley AB and the 26th Tactical Reconnaissance Wing at TRAB.

==== Berlin crisis ====
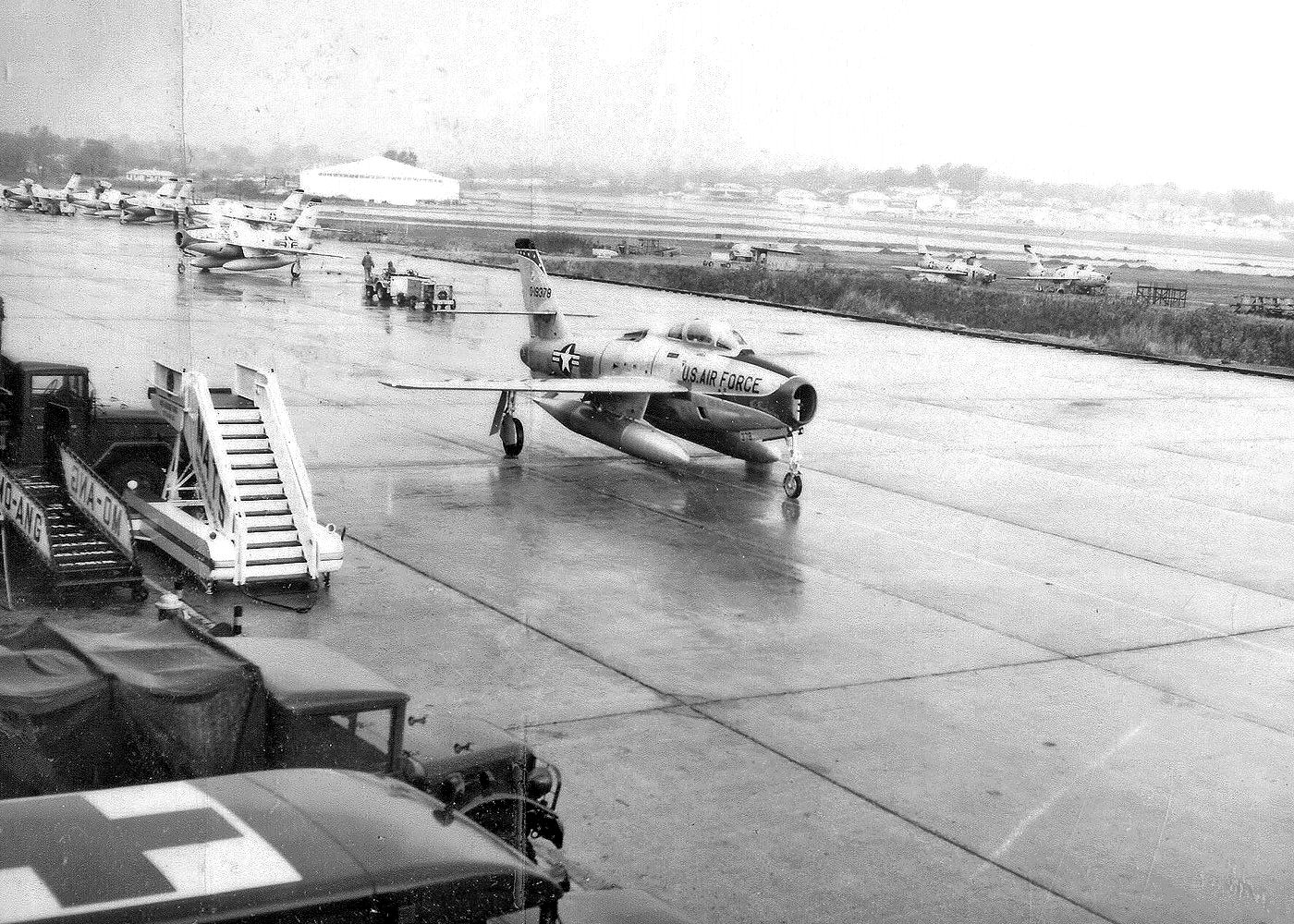
131st TFW F-84s on parking apron at Toul, 1961

On the night of 12 to 13 August 1961, East Germany began construction of the Berlin Wall. In response, NATO built up its forces in Europe. On 1 October 1961, the 131st Tactical Fighter Wing was deployed to TRAB to become the 7131st Tactical Fighter Wing (Provisional). It consisted of the 110th TFS from Lambert Field, Missouri, 169th TFS from Peoria Municipal Airport, Illinois and 170th TFS from Capitol Airport in Springfield, Illinois. Only the 131st TFS was deployed to TRAB, supplemented by two other squadrons of other Wings. The 7131st TFW left Toul on 19 July 1962.

==== 26th Tactical Reconnaissance Wing ====
On 1 July 1965, the 26th Tactical Reconnaissance Wing was activated at TRAB, resulting in the dissolution of the 7544th Support Group. The 26th TRW was formed by the 22nd TRS, previously based at RAF Alconbury with RB-66s, and the 32nd TRS coming with its McDonnell RF-101C Voodoos from the 66th TRW at Laon-Couvron Air Base. From 3 October 1965, the RB-66s and RF-101s were replaced by McDonnell Douglas RF-4C Phantom IIs. A third squadron, the 38th TRS, joined the 26th TRW at TRAB on 1 January 1966.

==== Closure of TRAB ====
On 7 March 1966, Charles de Gaulle announced France's withdrawal from NATO's Integrated Command and demanded the departure of all foreign armed forces from French territory. Jacques Chirac made an official announcement: "There is talk of bringing the 11th Fighter Wing back to the Toul-Rosières base." A first delegation from Bremgarten Air Base went to TRAB on 21 December 1966 to initiate negotiations with the Americans. In February 1967, French companies were required to carry out the first infrastructure works necessary for the arrival of French units.

The 26th TRW was disbanded at TRAB on 5 October 1966 and redeployed with the 38th and 32nd TRS to Ramstein Air Base. The 22nd TRS was assigned to Mountain Home, Idaho.

The 7544th Support Group was reactivated to close TRAB. The U.S. colors were lowered at TRAB on 21 March 1967. TRAB was closed and a detachment of military police was designated as the base guard. At the same time, a contingent of French civilian mechanics, led by an American team leader, remained on TRAB to keep the facilities in good condition.

=== Base aérienne 136 ===
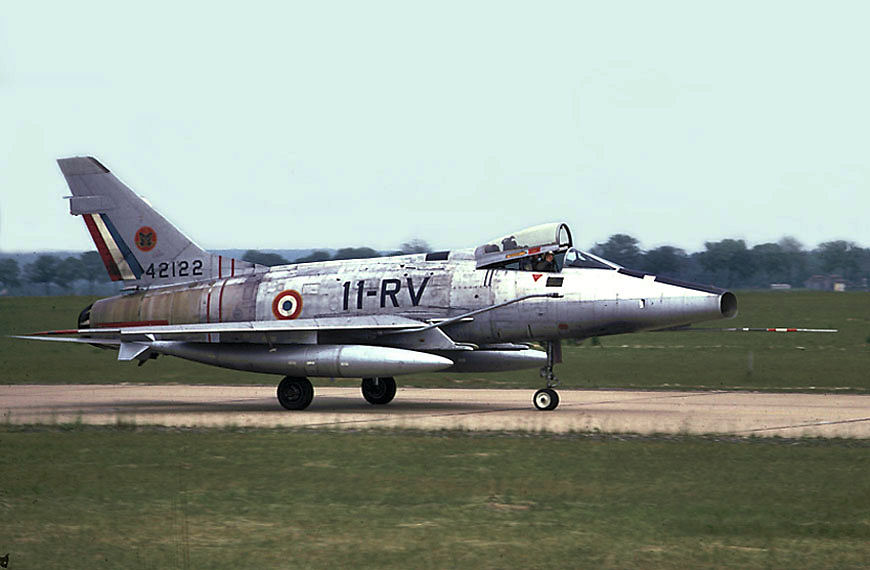
French Air Force, F-100D 3-11 "Corsica", June 1970

A first echelon left the Bremgarten base on 17 April 1967 to relocate to Toul-Rosières. On 15 May, Lieutenant colonel Espieux, accompanied by 150 men, took provisional command of the base. The new BA 136 was put into operation quickly. A first liaison plane landed there on 30 May 1967. The precursor of the 11th Fighter Wing commanded by Major Capillon on 24 June 1967. On 2 August 1967 the stop barriers (two to the north, one to the south) were declared operational and the runway lighting was declared operational on 5 September 1967. On September 14, 1967, Major Ghesquiere, head of the 11th Fighter Wing, led the first wave of 14 F-100s from Bremgarten. The next day, 15 September 1967, Colonel Chenet officially left his post in Bremgarten and took command of Toul-Rosières.

=== Decommissioning ===
At the beginning of 2000 the dismantling of Base 136 began. On 1 July 2000 the base was closed to air traffic.

On 31 August 2004 the base was officially closed.
