= Spangdahlem Air Base =

US air base in Rheinland-Pfalz, Germany

- Near Bitburg, Rheinland-Pfalz in Germany
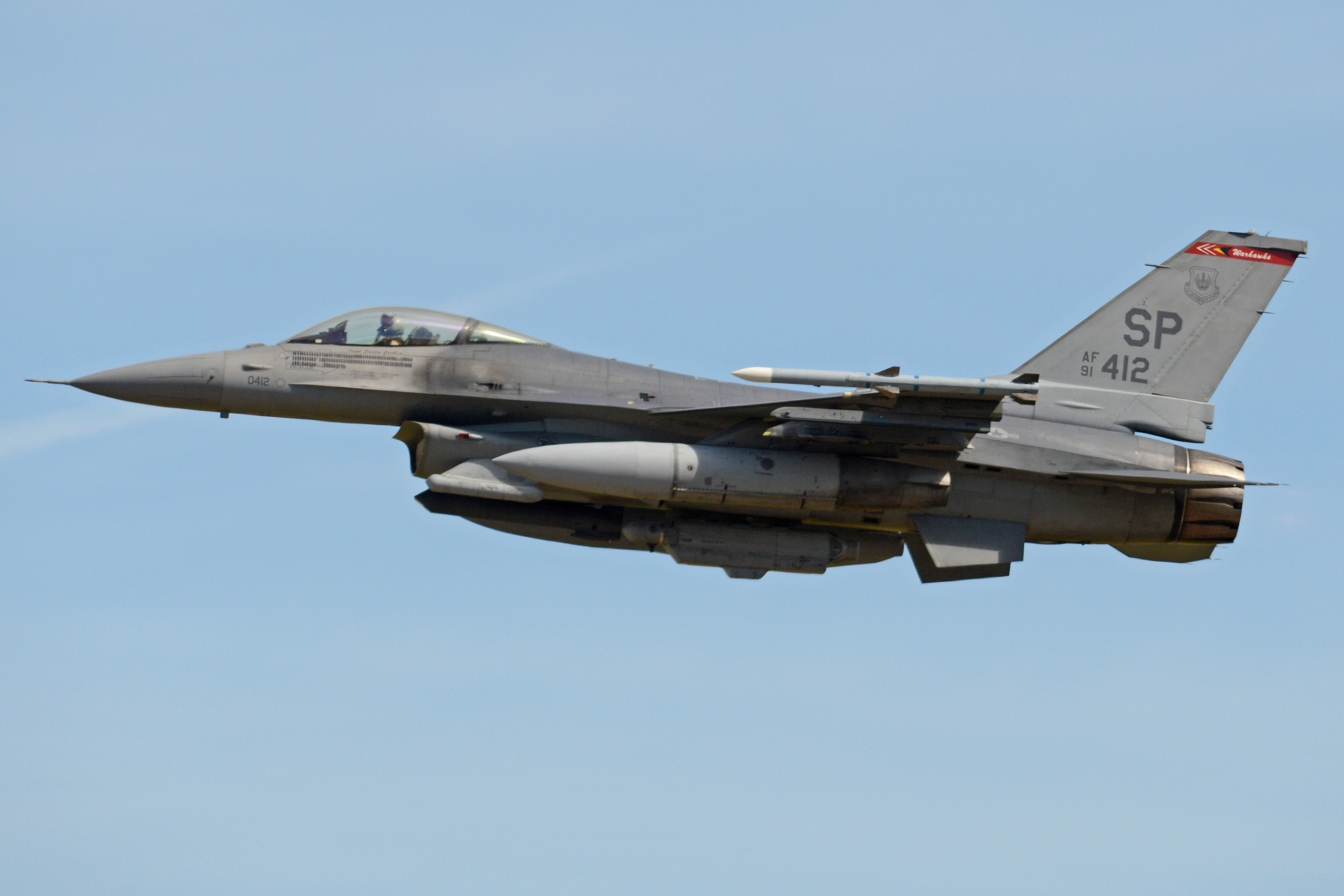
- A US Air Force F-16 Fighting Falcon of the 52nd Fighter Wing based at Spangdahlem.

Site information
- Type: US Air Force base
- Owner: German Federal Government (Bundesregierung)
- Operator: US Air Force
- Controlled by: US Air Forces in Europe – Air Forces Africa
- Condition: Operational
- Website: https://www.spangdahlem.af.mil/

Location
- Location within Rhineland-Palatinate Location within Germany
- Coordinates: 49°58′33″N 006°41′50″E
- Area: 519 hectares

Site history
- Built: 1951–1953
- In use: 1952 – present

Garrison information
- Current commander: Colonel William D. Lutmer
- Garrison: 52nd Fighter Wing
- Occupants: 480th Fighter Squadron; 726th Air Mobility Squadron; See Based units section for full list.

Airfield information
- Identifiers: IATA: SPM, ICAO: ETAD, WMO: 10607
- Elevation: 364.8 metres (1,197 ft) AMSL
Runways
Direction	Length and surface
05/23	3,055 metres (10,023 ft) Asphalt
- Source: SkyVector Aeronautical Charts

Spangdahlem Air Base (IATA: SPM, ICAO: ETAD, former code EDAD) is a NATO air base with the United States Air Force as a tenant constructed between 1951 and 1953 and located near the small German town of Spangdahlem, approximately 30 kilometres (19 mi) north of the city of Trier, Rhineland-Palatinate.

== History ==
After emerging as the victors in the Second World War, the Western Allies (France, US, UK) occupied western Germany under the terms of the Potsdam Agreement. With the creation of NATO in response to Cold War tensions in Europe, USAFE wanted its vulnerable fighter units in West Germany moved west of the Rhein River to provide greater air defense warning time. France agreed to air base sites within its zone of occupation in the Rheinland-Palatinate. Spangdahlem base was constructed between 1951 and 1953 at a cost of roughly $27,000,000 using French and German contractors, working under the supervision of a French government agency. The initial USAF military presence began on 1 September 1952 with the arrival of the 7352d Air Base Squadron from Fürstenfeldbruck Air Base near Munich. The mission of the 7532d ABS was to prepare the facility for an operational wing.

=== 10th Tactical Reconnaissance Wing ===
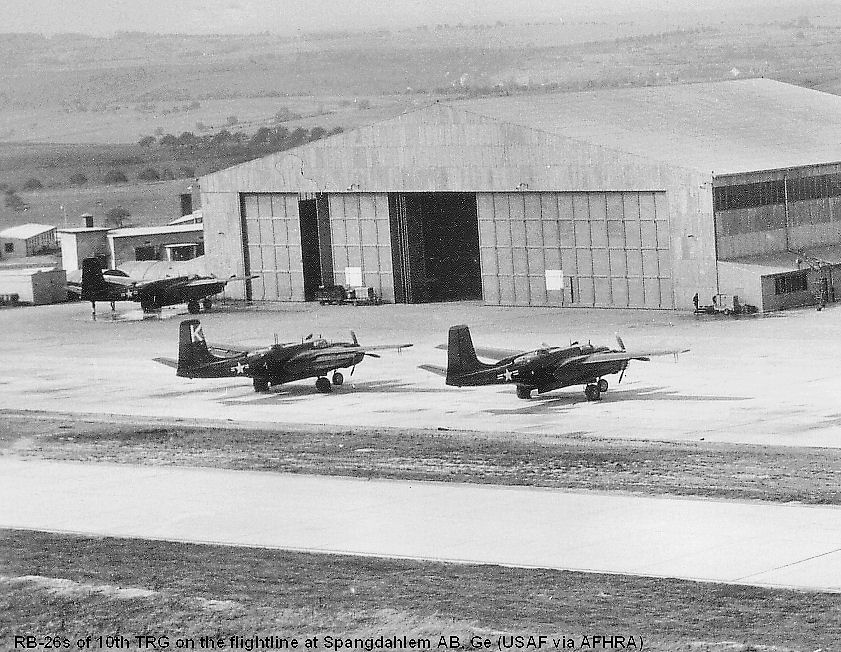
RB-26 Invaders of the 10th Tactical Reconnaissance Group at Spangdahlem AB during 1953

On 10 May 1953 the 10th Tactical Reconnaissance Wing was reassigned to Spangdahlem AB from Toul-Rosières Air Base, France. The base population at this time totaled slightly more than 1,900 personnel. Operational squadrons of the 10th TRW were:

- 1st Tactical Reconnaissance RB-26C, RB-57A
- 38th Tactical Reconnaissance RF-80A, RF-80F

Upon its arrival at Spangdahlem AB, the 10 TRW operated Lockheed RF-80A Shooting Star for daylight aerial recon and the Douglas RB-26C Invader for night recon missions. The RB-26s were replaced in October 1954 by Martin RB-57A Canberras and the RF-80s in July 1955 by Republic Aviation RF-84F Thunderjets.

In 1957 the RB-57s and RF-84s were transferred to Chateauroux-Deols Air Depot and the 1st and 38th were re-equipped with the Douglas RB-66 Destroyer. Three additional squadrons, the 19th and 30th (8 January 1958) and 42d Tactical Reconnaissance (8 December 1957) were assigned to the 10th TRW from the 66th TRW,(Sembach AB), flying variants of the RB-66.

- 19th Tactical Reconnaissance Squadron RB/EB-66
- 30th Tactical Reconnaissance Squadron RB-66B
- 42d Tactical Reconnaissance Squadron RB/WB-66

The 19th TRS operated from RAF Sculthorpe United Kingdom during 1958, moving to Spangdahlem in 1959. The 42nd TRS flew from RAF Chelveston and remained there as a detachment of the 10th TRW.

On 25 August 1959, the 10th TRW ended its six-year stay at Spangdahlem and moved to RAF Alconbury, United Kingdom.

=== 49th Tactical Fighter Wing ===
On 25 August 1959, the 49th Tactical Fighter Wing moved to Spangdahlem AB from the Etain-Rouvres Air Base, France, and assumed host unit duties. In 1957, the French Government decreed that all nuclear weapons and delivery aircraft had to be removed from French soil. As a result, the nuclear-capable North American F-100C/D Super Sabres of the 49th TFW had to be removed from France.

Squadrons of the 49th TFW at Spangdahlem were (squadron tail colour stripe):

- 7th Tactical Fighter (blue)
- 8th Tactical Fighter (yellow)
- 9th Tactical Fighter (red)

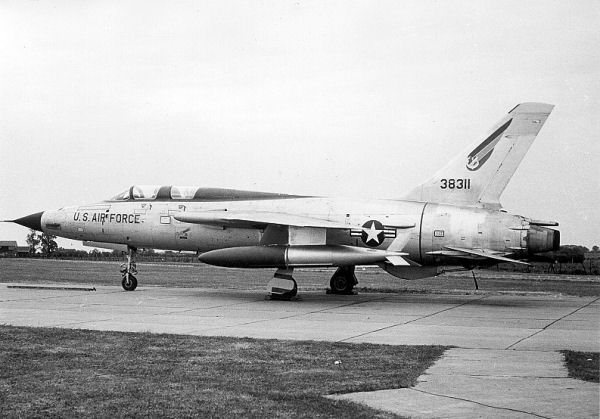
An F-105F Thunderchief of the 49th Tactical Fighter Wing during the 1960s

The 49th TFW flew F-100s until 1961 when it converted to the Republic F-105D/F Thunderchief, commonly known as the "Thud". The 49th TFW was only the third USAF unit to operate the F-105.

The 49th received two Air Force Outstanding Unit Awards for F-105 operations at Spangdahlem. On 9 March 1967, the Wing began receiving the McDonnell Douglas F-4D Phantom II.

The 49 TFW remained at Spangdahlem AB until 1 July 1968 when it relocated to Holloman Air Force Base, New Mexico, to serve as the US Air Force's first dual-based, NATO-committed wing.

The 38 TRS was never equipped with RB-66B models. When the 10 TRW re-equipped with the RB-66 the 38 TRS and the 32 TRS moved away from Spangdahlem (to France I believe) and re-equipped with RF-101s. The 1, 19, 30, and the 42 TRS remained at Spangdahlem until their move to the UK. The 1, 19, and 30 TRS flew the RB-66B and the 42 TRS flew the RB-66C and WB-66D. This movement of squadrons came about due to the introduction of the AFM 66-1 combined maintenance concept. It was decided to keep aircraft of one general type in the same units for maintenance and supply considerations. Fighter units got the RF-101 and bomber units got the RB-66 and these units combined accordingly.

=== 7149th/36th Tactical Fighter Wing ===
With the departure of the 49 TFW, the 7149th Air Base Group was activated to serve as a caretaker unit for a number of support organizations that remained behind after the departure of the 49 TFW. Although it did not have any assigned aircraft, the 7149 TFW would have served as a nucleus on which to build if the 49 TFW had been ordered to return to Europe to bolster NATO air forces. As part of "REFORGER" (return of forces to Germany) US Army, USAF units returned as "Crested Cap" including the entire 49th TFS in early 1969 and in 1970 and 1971 from Holloman AFB, NM. After 1969 the two 36th TFW assigned squadrons, 23rd TFS in F-4Cs and 39th TEWS in EB-66E and 2 EB-66C's were back in the runway alert facility, previously used by 49 TFW F-105s and F-4s, reactivated in Dec 1969. 23rd TFS simply moved to next Eifel Mtn hill top into old 49th TFW squadron buildings and 39th TEWS began assembling in April with aircraft from 4417th CCTS and personnel from both Shaw AFB, SC and returning SEA EB-66 combat crewmembers many of whom the 363rd TRW Combat Crew Instructors had themselves trained the previous few years.

In January 1969, the 36th Tactical Fighter Wing, located at nearby Bitburg Air Base, assumed operational control of Spangdahlem, and became a dual-based wing. Squadrons from the 36 TFW assigned to Spangdahlem were:

- 23d Tactical Fighter Squadron (F-4D, Tail Code: BS, red tail stripe)
- 39th Tactical Electronic Warfare Squadron (EB-66E and EB-66C, Tail Code: BV, green tail stripe)

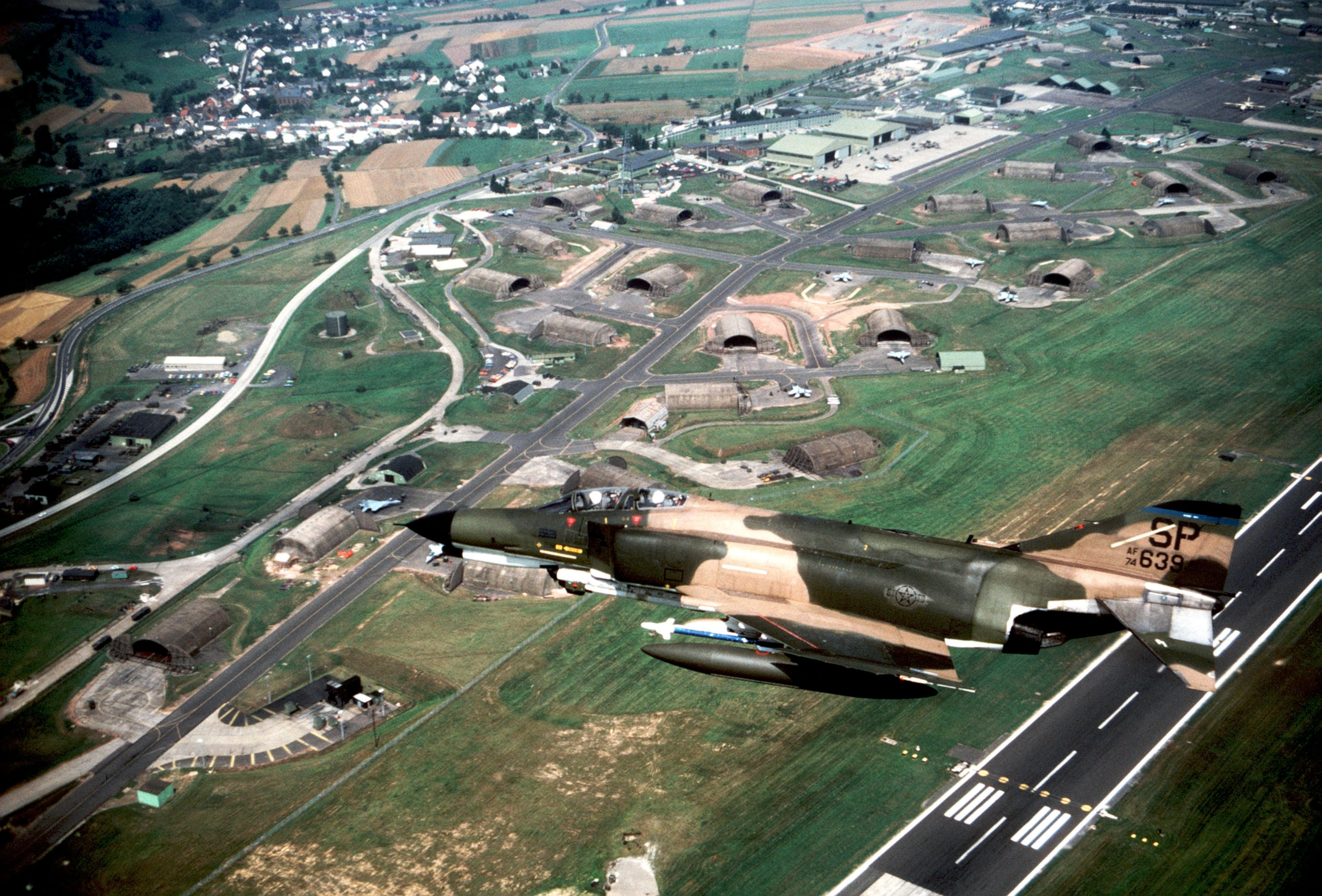
An F-4E Phantom II from the 23rd Tactical Fighter Squadron Spangdahlem AB in flight over its home base in 1983

The 23 TFS carried out tactical fighter training missions, while the 39 TEWS was a newly formed squadron to conduct electronic warfare missions and train ground radar site crews all around NATO in electronic warfare based on SEA strike force experience needed to protect the fleet against SAM, AAA and fighter aircraft based in the East Iron Curtain Soviet Bloc nations. Spangdahlem retained status of a Nuclear Strike base and also housed USAFE Eifel Control in the Base Operations Tower.

Orders for 39th TEWS personnel originally were to Bitburg AB but shortly prior it was realized the additional 2,000 feet of runway on the larger inactive hilltop at Spangdahlem was a great benefit to the older EB-66 which had gained weight on modifications at Tulsa Plant where heavier cables for greatly increased jamming capability from RB-66B to EB-66E were added without removing the earlier in hard to get to areas. Near same time, plans to modify the early turbo jet engines to modern high bypass design were not considered with plans to retire the 1950s design in very few years and end of SEA needs. Modern miniature electronics were to allow the strike aircraft to carry their own modular ECM components in a great 30 minute rush to the border and roll back of enemy forces. This was envisioned as "Plugging the Fulda Gap" with WW 2-style massed armored Soviet forces.

=== 52d Tactical Fighter Wing ===
On 31 December 1971, the 52d Tactical Fighter Wing was transferred without personnel or equipment from Suffolk County AFB, New York to Spangdahlem. The unit had been a sort of personal National Guard wing for top World War II P-47 ace Gabby Gabreski. Inactivated then reactivated as a new USAFE wing, the new Wing Commander was to be the first black USAFE Wing CO, Col Thomas E. Clifford, who had been 35th TFW DCO at Da Nang AB Viet Nam. The old 49th Wing HQ mostly vacant while 7149th inactive era was assigned a few personnel to begin the transition in October 1971. Recent promoted Col John J (Jack), Gaudion, former 23 TFS Sqdn CO became Base Commander designate and Captain Don I. Phillips, a 39th TEWS Navigator/Bombardier, stepped in as additional duty Public Information Officer and initial Wing Historian to record events and prepare Col Clifford's Dec Arrival. A few PIO personnel from Bitburg were assigned to the Information office from 36th TFW Information Office. Upon activation in Germany, the 52 TFW assumed control of the two squadrons the 36 TFW had located at Spangdahlem:

- 23d Tactical Fighter (F-4D, Tail Code: SP, blue tail stripe)
- 39th Tactical Electronic Warfare (EB-66E and C, Tail Code: SP, yellow tail stripe)

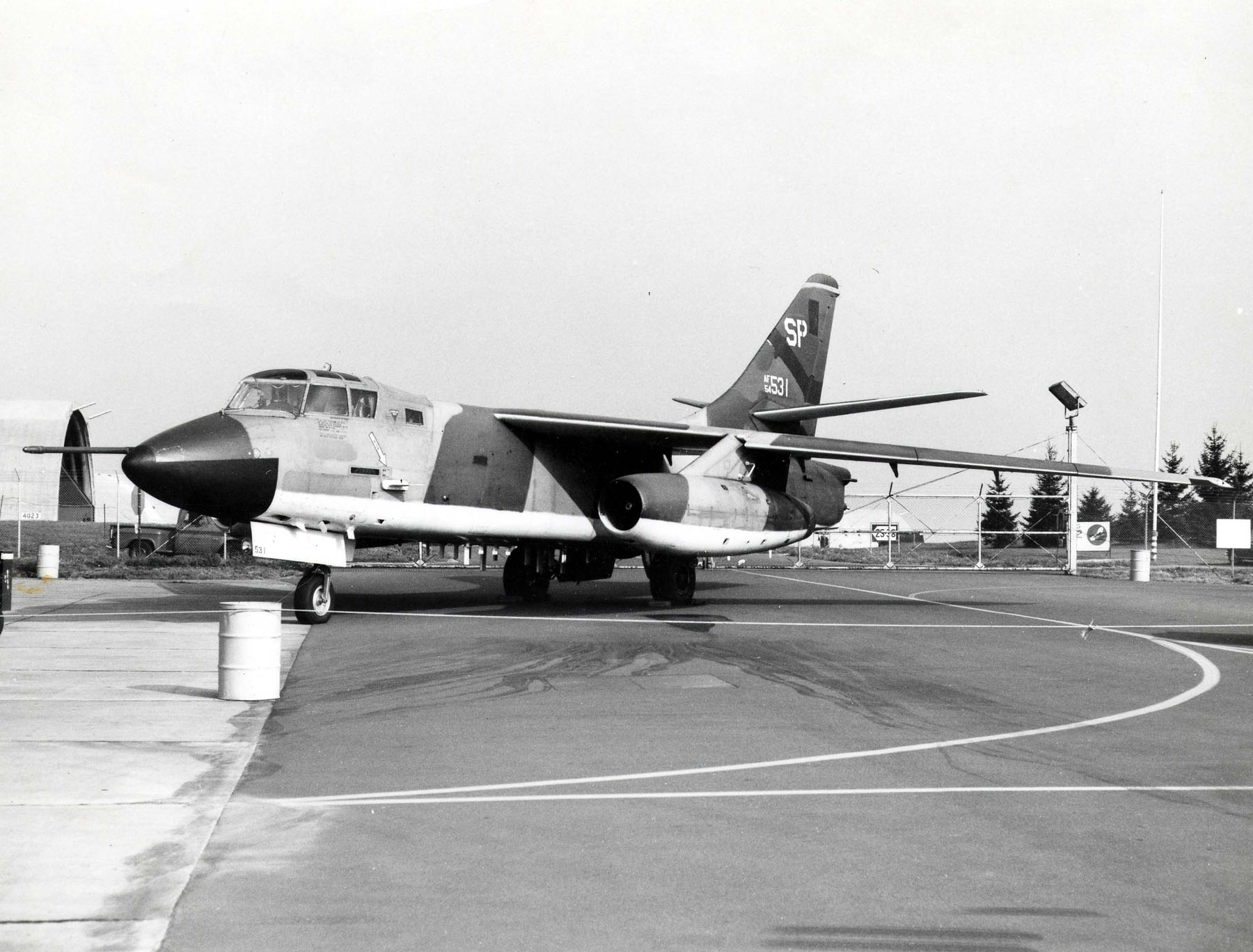
An EB-66E Destroyer of the 39th Tactical Electronic Warfare Squadron at Spangdahlem AB in 1972

During warm seasons in 1970 and 1971 operations shifted back to Bitburg while the runway was resurfaced at Spangdahlem. During this period the hardened NATO "Tab-V" shelters were constructed at both bases while operations around them continued. EB-66s were too large and remained parked around the ramp at the large hangar. End of runway alert aircraft F4s and EB-66's were under shelter for weather protection only. "V" or Victor Alert denoted nuclear forces from the British bombers Victor and Vulcan beginning with that letter. "E" Alert was for ECM.

The 39 TEWS was disbanded and personnel reassigned on 1 January 1973. Aircraft were returned to Shaw then retired by 1975. In turn, it was replaced in the electronic warfare role by the 81st Tactical Fighter Squadron, flying the McDonnell Douglas EF-4C Phantom II, being transferred to Spangdahlem from Zweibrücken Air Base, Germany under project "Creek Action" on 15 January 1973.

The 4th TFW had three short-term deployments (F-4E) for European contingency support in March 1974, July and September 1975.

The 52 TFW gained its third fighter squadron with the activation of the 480th Tactical Fighter Squadron on 15 November 1976. On 1 January 1977, the 52 TFW had the following operational squadrons:

- 23d Tactical Fighter Squadron (F-4D w/ blue tail stripe, tail code: SP) "Fighting Hawks"
- 81st Tactical Fighter Squadron (EF-4C w/ yellow tail stripe, tail code: SP) "Wild Weasels"
- 480th Tactical Fighter Squadron (F-4D w/ red tail stripe, tail code: SP) "Warhawks"

In 1979, the more capable Wild Weasel F-4G had replaced the EF-4Cs of the 81 TFS, and in 1980 through 1982, F-4Es replaced the F-4Ds of the 23d and 480th TFSs.

A complete reorganization of wing aircraft and aircrews occurred in November 1983, transforming the 52d TFW into the first and only all-defense suppression wing outside of the United States. Under this configuration, each of the wing's three fighter squadrons flew E and G model F-4s paired together into Wild Weasel "hunter/killer" teams, capable of locating and destroying enemy radar-guided, surface-to-air threats in all weather.

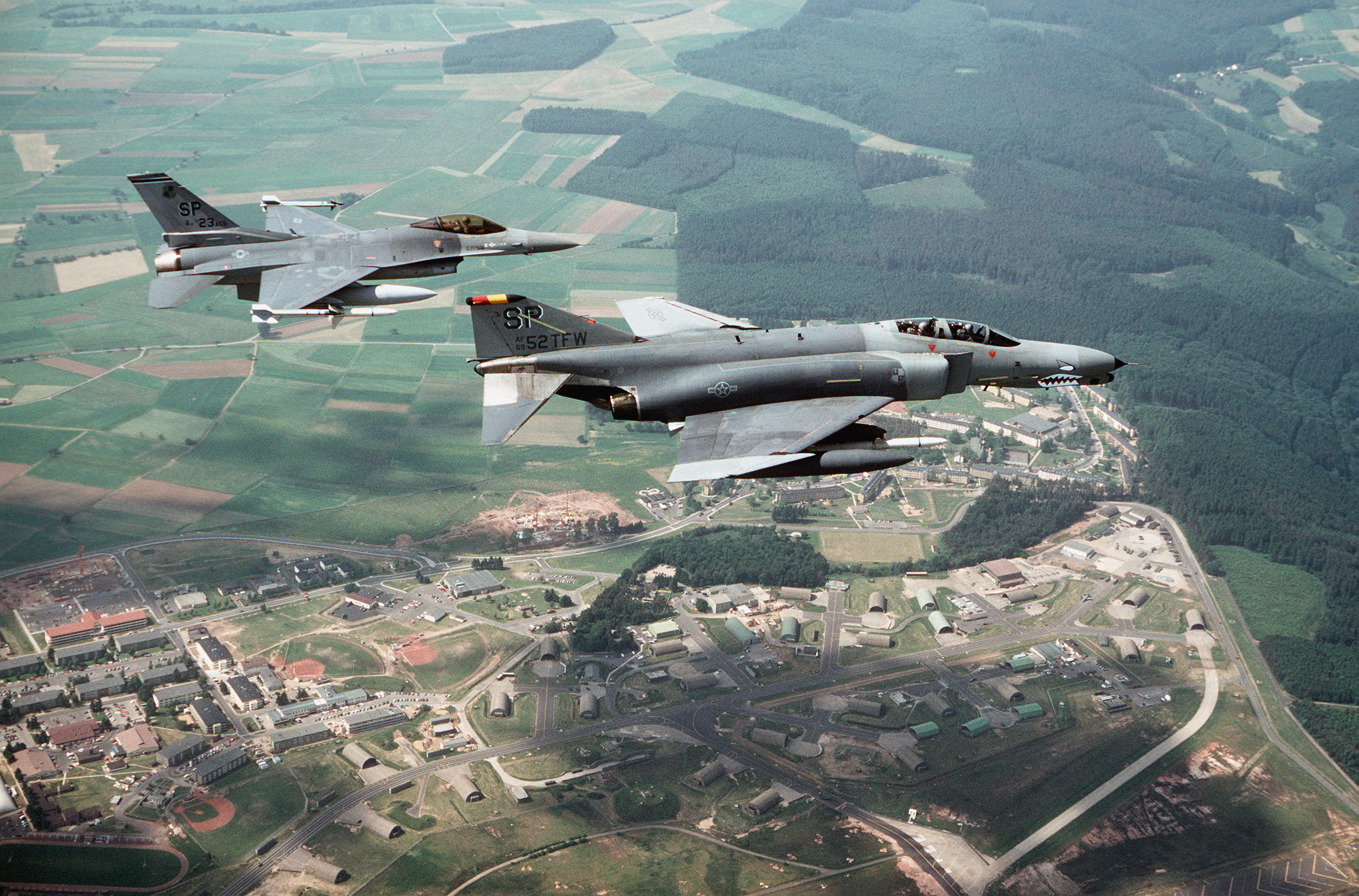
A F-4G Phantom II (foreground) and a F-16C Fighting Falcon of the 23rd Tactical Fighter Squadron, both assigned to the 52nd Tactical Fighter Wing, fly over Spangdahlem AB during 1989

In April 1987, the 52d began changing with the times and replaced its aging Phantoms with Block 30/32 F-16C/D Fighting Falcons for the 23d and 480th TFSs. These were later replaced with Block 50 versions beginning in 1993. The last USAF operational model F-4E Phantom II aircraft departed Spangdahlem AB in December 1987. In late 1990, the 81st TFS reorganized to exclusively fly the F-4G, then deployed 24 aircraft to Sheikh Isa Air Base, Bahrain for Operation Desert Storm combat operations.

52d Fighter Wing

On 1 October 1991, the 52 TFW was redesignated the 52d Fighter Wing as part of a sweeping, Air Force-wide restructure.

The 510th Fighter Squadron was moved to Spangdahlem with the closure of RAF Bentwaters United Kingdom on 4 January 1993 as the lone A-10 Thunderbolt II squadron in USAFE. Also in early 1993, the 81st FS was reorganized to fly a mixture of F-4Gs and Block 30 F-16C/Ds.

The F-4Gs were withdrawn and sent to the AMARC in February 1994. With the withdrawal of the Phantoms, the 510th Fighter Squadron was replaced by the 81st FS at Spangdahlem, and was transferred to Ramstein Air Base to absorb the F-16 assets of the 512th FS there.

In February 1994, the 53d Fighter Squadron relocated to Spangdahlem from Bitburg after its closure with F-15C/Ds. The 480 FS was also inactivated during October 1994, being replaced by the 22d Fighter Squadron from Bitburg. The 606th Air Control Squadron was also assigned to the 52d Fighter Wing but remained at Bitburg until September 1995 before moving to Spangdahlem.

After the restructuring and the closure of Bitburg and transfer of 36 FW squadrons to Spangdahlem, the operational squadrons of the 52d Fighter Wing were:

- 23d Fighter (F-16CJ/D Blue tail stripe, Code: SP)
- 22d Fighter (F-16CJ/D Red tail stripe, Code: SP)
- 53d Fighter (F-15C/D Yellow and black tail stripe (Tiger stripes), Code: SP)
- 81st Fighter (A/OA-10A Yellow tail stripe, Code: SP)

On May 30, 1995 Major Grey 'Zane' Lowry was killed when his F-15C crashed at immediately after takeoff from Spangdahlem Air Base. Investigation showed that during routine maintenance, mechanics had crossed and mis-connected the control rods. Two mechanics were charged with negligent homicide. One committed suicide during his military trial. Charges against the other mechanic were dropped. This same crossed-control rod installation had happened in USAF F-15s at least twice previously, in 1986 and 1991, but the error was caught on the ground. (see 53rd FS for complete info).

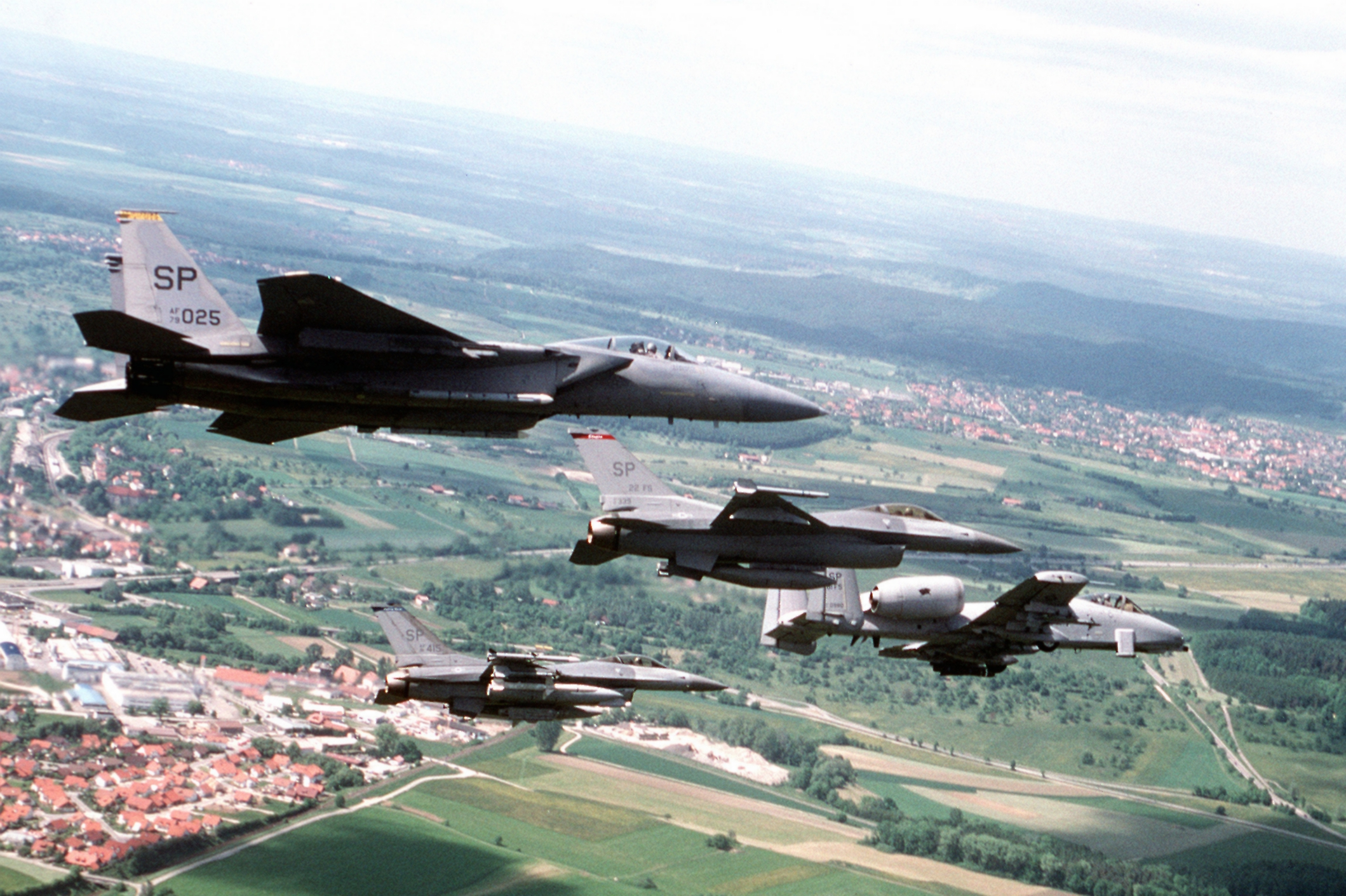
An F-15C Eagle, two F-16C Fighting Falcons and an A-10A Thunderbolt II, all of the 52nd Fighter Wing over Germany during 1997

The 52d made history in 1997 with its first-ever deployment to a former Warsaw Pact nation. In September, the 52d participated in EAGLE’S TALON-97, the first bilateral exercise involving US and Polish Air Forces. Units from the 52d deployed under the air expeditionary force (AEF) doctrine and formed the 52d Air Expeditionary Wing, operating out of Powidz AB, Krzesiny AB, and Poznan, Poland.

=== Mission change ===
During the second quarter of Fiscal Year 1999, the 52nd witnessed the inactivation of the 53rd Fighter Squadron. The 53d had called Spangdahlem Air Base home since February 1994, when the squadron moved from Bitburg Air Base. As the squadron prepared for its inactivation in March 1999, all of the F-15s were transferred to the 1st Fighter Wing at Langley AFB, Virginia (USA), or to the 48th Fighter Wing at RAF Lakenheath, United Kingdom.

In April 2010, the wing's strength was reduced by one third. 20 F-16Cs were flown to the 148th Fighter Wing, Minnesota Air National Guard and one F-16 was transferred to Edwards Air Force Base, California. All aircraft were from the 22nd Fighter Squadron. As a result of the drawdown of F-16s, the 22d and 23d Fighter Squadrons were inactivated on 13 August 2010 and formed a single "new" squadron, the 480th Fighter Squadron. In February 2012, it was announced that the 81st Fighter Squadron would be inactivated in 2013, leaving the 52d Fighter Wing with just one squadron.

In February 2015, the 354th Fighter Squadron was deployed from Davis-Monthan Air Force Base to Spangdahlem in support of Operation Atlantic Resolve, with twelve A-10Cs and approximately 300 airmen. The unit trained alongside NATO allies and was deployed to locations in Eastern European NATO nations, to further enhance interoperability. The A-10s were the first of several theater security package deployments to Europe, U.S. Air Force officials said, adding that rotations generally will last six months, depending on mission and United States European Command requirements.

=== European posture review ===
On 8 January 2015 the US Secretary of Defense announced the results of the European Infrastructure Consolidation (EIC) review, which was to realign several missions in US Air Forces in Europe and Air Forces Africa. Under the EIC, changes would be made to the mission at Spangdahlem, including the relocation of the 606th Air Control Squadron to Aviano Air Base, Italy, in order to free up space and infrastructure for the future relocation of the 352nd Special Operations Group from RAF Mildenhall, UK.

The US European Command Force Posture review was announced on 29 July 2020, which indicated the US military would be reducing its presence at Spangdahlem. The 480th Fighter Squadron and its F-16 Fighting Falcons and other elements of the 52nd Fighter Wing were planned to relocate to Italy, while units based at RAF Mildenhall, which had been scheduled to relocate to Spangdahlem, would no longer move. Following the announcement, officials at the 52nd Fighter Wing said that Spangdahlem would remain open to carry out other missions carried out by the wing, separate from F-16 operations. However, in February 2021, the plans were put on hold as the Biden administration reviewed the previous administration's proposals. It was confirmed in December 2021 as part of the Department of Defense's Global Posture Review that the planned move of F-16s had been cancelled.

=== 2022 Russian invasion of Ukraine ===
In the wake of the 2022 Russian invasion of Ukraine, twelve F-35A Lightning II fighters of the 34th Fighter Squadron, based at Hill Air Force Base in Utah, deployed to Spangdahlem in February 2022. In March 2022, they were joined by four KC-135 Stratotankers of the 92nd Air Refueling Wing, based at Fairchild Air Force Base, as well as six EA-18G Growler electronic warfare aircraft of the US Navy's Electronic Attack Squadron 134 (VAQ-134), based at Naval Air Station Whidbey Island.

On the airfield, it is a part of the major maneuver from June 12 to June 23, 2023, held under the leadership of the German Air Force Air Defender 23. It is the greatest exercise of air forces since the creation of NATO.

== Role and operations ==
=== Air combat ===
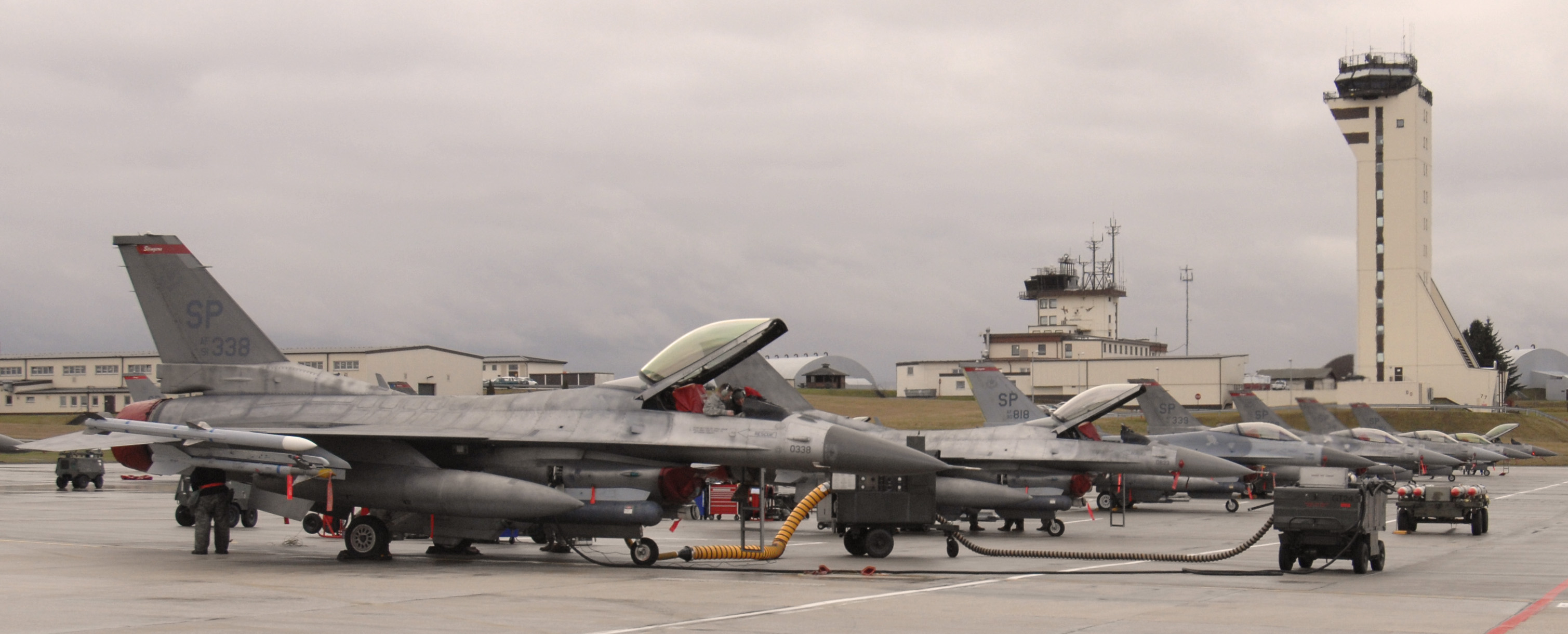
F-16 Fighting Falcons of the 52nd Fighter Wing parked at Spangdahlem Air Base during 2010

Spangdahlem is home of the 52nd Fighter Wing, which maintains, deploys and employs Lockheed Martin Block 50 F-16CM/DM. The wing supports the Supreme Allied Commander Europe with mission-ready personnel and systems providing expeditionary air power. The wing also supports contingencies and operations other than war.

The wing also supports geographically separate units throughout Europe, including the 701st Munitions Support Squadron, Kleine Brogel AB, Belgium; 702nd Munitions Support Squadron, Büchel AB, Germany; 703nd Munitions Support Squadron, Volkel AB, Netherlands; and 704th Munitions Support Squadron, Ghedi AB, Italy. Each squadron is responsible for the ownership, custody, accountability and release of war reserve munitions.

=== Air mobility ===
Air Mobility Command (AMC) supports cargo and passenger traffic at Spangdahlem. With the closure of the Rhein-Main Air Base in 2005, the Rhein-Main Transition Program was initiated to transfer all its former transport capacities to Ramstein Air Base (70%) and Spangdahlem AB (30%). The 726th Air Mobility Squadron supports cargo and passenger traffic as part of its airlift mission, providing command and control, maintenance and aerial port capability to all AMC aircraft transiting the base.

== Based units ==
Flying and notable non-flying units based at Spangdahlem Air Base.

=== United States Air Force ===
US Air Forces in Europe - Air Forces Africa (USAFE-AFAFRICA)

- Third Air Force
  - 52nd Fighter Wing
    - 52nd Comptroller Squadron
    - 52nd Operations Group
      - 480th Fighter Squadron – F-16CM/DM Fighting Falcon
      - 52nd Operations Support Squadron
    - 52nd Maintenance Group
      - 52nd Aircraft Maintenance Squadron
      - 52nd Maintenance Squadron
    - 52nd Medical Group
      - 52nd Operational Medical Readiness Squadron
      - 52nd Dental Squadron
      - 52nd Health Care Operations Squadron
      - 52nd Medical Support Squadron
    - 52nd Mission Support Group
      - 52nd Civil Engineer Squadron
      - 52nd Communications Squadron
      - 52nd Contracting Squadron
      - 52nd Force Support Squadron
      - 52nd Logistics Readiness Squadron
      - 52nd Security Forces Squadron
    - 52nd Munitions Maintenance Group

Air Mobility Command (AMC)

- 521st Air Mobility Operations Wing
  - 721 Air Mobility Operations Group
    - 726th Air Mobility Squadron

Air Education and Training Command (AETC)

- Second Air Force
  - 82nd Training Wing
    - 982nd Training Group
      - 372nd Training Squadron (Detachment 17)

== Infrastructure ==
=== AFN-transmitters ===
The Spangdahlem Air Base has two AFN radio transmitters: one for AM and one for FM. The AM-transmitter is located south of the western end of the airstrip at 49.960104 N 6.682697 E. It was the last AM-transmitter built in Germany and was in operation from 2013 to 2015 on the frequency 1143 kHz with 300 W transmission power. The facility is unused since 2015.

The transmitter however was obviously converted into a NDB-transmitter. As one can see on satellite pictures on Google Earth from April 23, 2021, a fenced concrete plate was built at 49.959936 N 6.681452 E. Between this plate and the former AFN transmitter building a trench with an underground cable was realized. On the plate an umbrella antenna consisting of a trailer-mounted mast, which may be insulated against ground, was installed. The frequency of this NDB-transmitter is not listed, but it may work as similar installations on a frequency between 280 kHz and 526 kHz.

The FM-transmitter is located east of the main gate of Spangdahlem Air Base and uses a free-standing lattice tower at 49.981896 N 6.689459 E for its antenna. It transmits on 105.1 MHz with 1 kW transmission power.

== See also ==
- List of United States Air Force installations
- Killing of Michael Ovsjannikov, a German civilian by a U.S. airman stationed at the base in 2023. No military personnel were found responsible for the crime.

== Bibliography ==
- Klemmer, Andreas; Cunningham, Keith (1995), Restructuring the US Military Bases in Germany – Scope, Impacts, and Opportunities (PDF), Bonn International Center for Conversion
- Donald, David, Century Jets - USAF Frontline Fighters of the Cold War., 1995
- Endicott, Judy G.: USAF Active Air Force Wings as of 1 October 1995. Office of Air Force History
- Endicott, Judy G.: USAF Active Flying, Space, and Missile Squadrons as of 1 October 1995. Office of Air Force History
- Fletcher, Harry R.: Air Force Bases Volume II, Active Air Force Bases outside the United States of America on 17 September 1982, Office of Air Force History, 1989
- Maurer Maurer, Air Force Combat Units Of World War II, Office of Air Force History, 1983
- Martin, Patrick: Tail Code: The Complete History Of USAF Tactical Aircraft Tail Code Markings, 1994
- Ravenstein, Charles A.: Air Force Combat Wings Lineage and Honors Histories 1947-1977, Office of Air Force History, 1984
- Rogers, Brian: United States Air Force Unit Designations Since 1978, 2005
- USAAS-USAAC-USAAF-USAF Aircraft Serial Numbers--1908 to present
