= Fürstenfeldbruck Air Base =

Former German Air Force military airfield

Fürstenfeldbruck Air Base Flugplatz Fürstenfeldbruck Advanced Landing Ground R-72

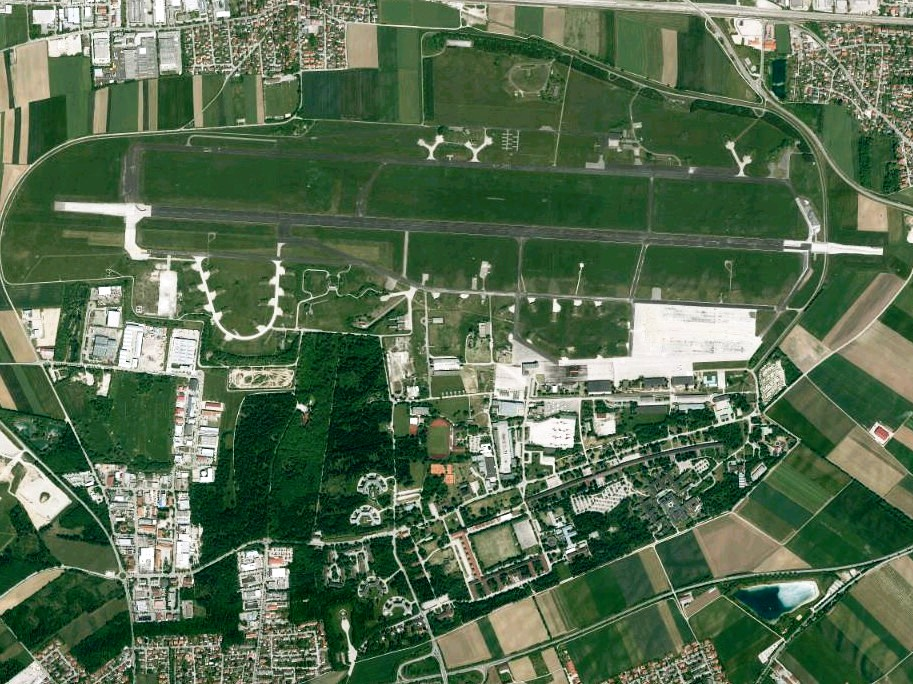
- IATA: FEL; ICAO: ETSF

Summary
- Airport type: Military
- Owner: Unified Armed Forces of the Federal Republic of Germany
- Operator: German Air Force
- Location: Fürstenfeldbruck, Germany
- Elevation AMSL: 1,703 ft (519 m)
- Coordinates: 48°12′24″N 11°15′59″E

Map
- Location of Fürstenfeldbruck Air Base

Runways
Direction	Length		Surface
Direction	m	ft	Surface
08/26	2,744	9,002	Asphalt

Fürstenfeldbruck Air Base (German: Fliegerhorst Fürstenfeldbruck or Flugplatz Fürstenfeldbruck) is a former German Air Force airfield near the town of Fürstenfeldbruck in Bavaria, near Munich, Germany.

Fürstenfeldbruck became famous first as the main training base for the German Luftwaffe during World War II, then as the site of the Munich massacre of nine Israeli athletes and coaches (two were killed earlier) and one German police officer at the 1972 Summer Olympics. Military flight operations ceased in 2003, a small civil flight operation ended in 2015. The adjacent barracks are still used by the German Air Force Officer Training School, which is to be relocated to Roth. In the eastern part of the former air base, the BMW Driving Academy Maisach was established.

== Units ==
Since 1957, Fürstenfeldbruck has been the home of the German Air Force Officer Training School. Various aircraft (G-91, Alpha Jet, T-33, Tornado) operated from the base until 1997 when all flying was halted.

Today, Fürstenfeldbruck hosts the following units:

- HQ 1st Air Division (Germany)
- Officer school of the Air Force,
- Photo Intelligence School
- Aeromedical Institute of the Air Force,
- School for Military Geophysics
- IT-Sector 1
- Military Driving School
- Military Medical Center
- Military Training Aid Office
- Base Administration Office

== History ==
The Air Base was established in 1935, and was the Luftkriegsschule 4 (LKS 4—4th Air War School) of the Luftwaffe during World War II. Field Marshal Hermann Göring is said to have taken a deep personal interest in establishing an air force training base for the Luftwaffe and modeled Fürstenfeldbruck after the United States Army Air Forces training center at Randolph Field, Texas.

The RAF and USAAF understood that Fürstenfeldbruck was being used extensively as a training base, and believed it to be of little strategic importance. Consequently, it escaped bombing until the later stages of the war, and then it was attacked severely.

Allied bombing began to desolate many German cities in 1944 and in October the Luftwaffe leaders rushed work to extend the air base's runways long enough for fighter aircraft takeoffs. Thousand of slave laborers are said to have "expedited" this project and as the war neared its final critical stages the Luftwaffe was able to mount fighters from the base. That, however, provoked the Allies to make the only serious bombing raid on the field.

Fifty direct hits were made on the field the afternoon of 9 April 1945 when 338 B-17s of the 1st Air Division, Eighth Air Force, unleashed 867 tons of bombs on the runways, hangars, repair shops, and other facilities.

=== USAF use ===
When the Allied Forces moved in to take possession of the field in late April, they found that Prisoners of War and townspeople had looted until they left a deserted installation. Fürstenfeldbruck was occupied by American forces and was at first the home of a US Army engineering battalion. After some reconstruction, Fürstenfeldbruck became the Headquarters, UAAF/ET Replacement Depot (Provisional) in November 1945. Tens of thousands of fresh Army Air Force replacement troops from the Zone of the Interior (ZI), as the USA was referred to, arrived in trains from Le Havre and were housed in stone barracks for a week or so before being assigned to their final airbase or other destination, where they replaced veteran airmen who were redeployed home for discharge, also through the Replacement Depot. The offices and base personnel housing were excellent and included a fully equipped theater, natatorium (indoor swimming pool), mess hall, and 4-man bedrooms, each with its own bathroom, all housed in stone buildings rather than wooden barracks or tents.

Several other USAAF units performed occupation duty at Fürstenfeldbruck:

- 70th Fighter Wing (28 July - 9 November 1945)
- 306th Bombardment Group (16 August - 13 September 1946)
  Assigned to the 128th Replacement Battalion, AAF/ET Replacement Depot.
- 45th Reconnaissance Group (April - June 1947)

The 306th Bomb Group engaged in special photographic mapping duty in western Europe and North Africa. Its 34th Reconnaissance Squadron flew these missions with B-17s. This assignment was continued by the 160th Photographic Reconnaissance squadron of the 10th Recon Group flying F-5 (P-38) and F-6 (P-51) aircraft.

During First Berlin Crisis, B-29-equipped 301st Bombardment Group was stationed at Fürstenfeldbruck for a short period in July/August 1948.

The Replacement Depot functioned until August 1948, when USAFE decided to use Fürstenfeldbruck as an operational jet base.

==== 36th Fighter-Bomber Wing ====
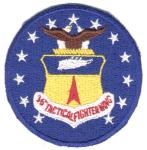

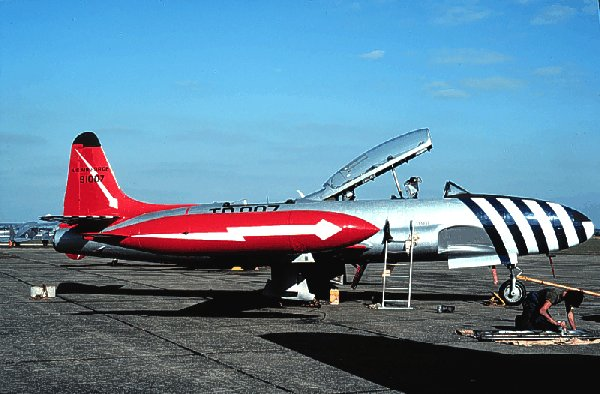
T-33 (former TF-80C) 49-1007 of the 22d FS, 36th Fighter Wing, 1950

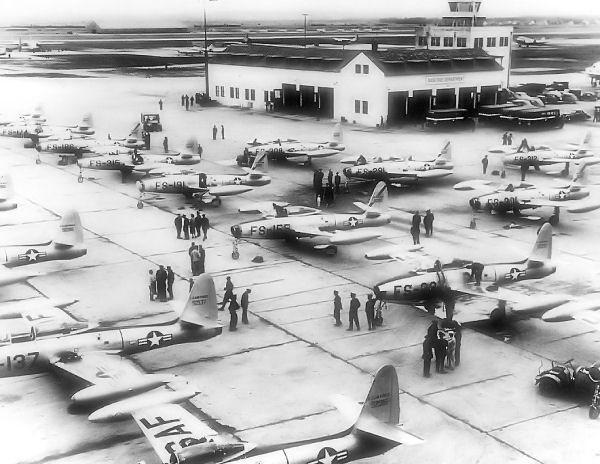
Republic F-84G Thunderjets of the 27th Strategic Fighter Wing, Bergstrom AFB Texas, just before taking off for Fürstenfeldbruck Air Base, West Germany

On 13 August 1948 the 36th Fighter Wing was assigned to Fürstenfeldbruck Air Base as an operational unit. The unit was transferred to Germany from Howard Air Force Base, Canal Zone. When the wing arrived in Germany, it became the first USAFE unit to be jet-equipped with the Lockheed F-80A/B "Shooting Star".

Active squadrons of the 36th FW were:

- 22d Fighter (F-80A/B, Red color band)
- 23d Fighter (F-80A/B, Blue color band)
- 53d Fighter (F-80A/B, Green color band)

Markings of the squadrons consisted of a color band under the fin, and a long lightning flash with an arrowhead tip on its forward end, extending back from the nose to the center of the fuselage.

In May 1949, HQ USAFE authorized the 36th Fighter Group to form the "Skyblazers" aerial demo team to perform at European and Mediterranean area air shows. The new USAFE Skyblazers team from Fürstenfeldbruck AB made its first-ever performance in October 1949 at RAF Gütersloh in the British zone of then-occupied Germany.

On 20 January 1950, the 36th FW was redesignated as a Fighter-Bomber Wing (FBW) when 89 Republic F-84E "Thunderjets" arrived. The F-80s were sent back to CONUS to equip Air National Guard units.

The squadrons retained the same color designations with their F-84s, however the F-84 markings consisted of a solid geometric shape painted on the vertical stabilizer, just above the radio call number, with a capital letter specific to each aircraft at the center. Eventually these markings gave way to medium blue/white striping angled about 15 degrees up on the vertical stabilizer surfaces, with squadron colors being painted on them.

The 36th FBW remained at Fürstenfeldbruck until 1952 when it was reassigned to Bitburg Air Base, west of the Rhine.

==== 117th Tactical Reconnaissance Wing ====
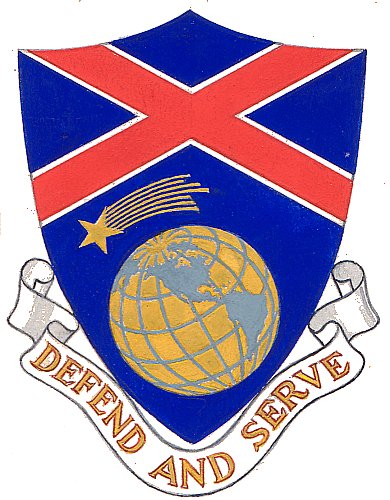

RF-80 of the 117th Tactical Reconnaissance Wing - France

On 27 January 1952 the activated Air National Guard 117th Tactical Reconnaissance Wing deployed to Europe as was assigned to Toul-Rosières Air Base, France. In 1952, Toul Air Base was unfinished at the time of the wings activation/deployment and not yet ready for jet aircraft. This meant only the Wing HQ was in France, and the two attached RF-80A squadrons were moved to Germany. The 160th to Neubiberg Air Base; the 112th and 157th to Fürstenfeldbruck.

The mission of the 1117th TRW was to provide tactical, visual, photographic and electronic reconnaissance by both day and night, as was required by the military forces within the European command. The RF-80's were responsible for the daylight operations, and the RB-25s for night reconnaissance.

The Wing's complement of aircraft was 15 RB-26Cs and 14 RF-80As, assigned as follows:

- 112th Tactical Reconnaissance (RB-26C, Yellow stripes on tail)
- 157th Tactical Reconnaissance (RF-80A, Red stripes on tail)

In addition, each squadron had a T-33A trainer assigned to it.

On 9 July 1952 the activated Air National Guard 117th TRW was released from active duty.

==== 10th Tactical Reconnaissance Wing ====
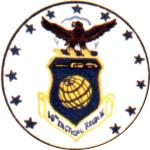

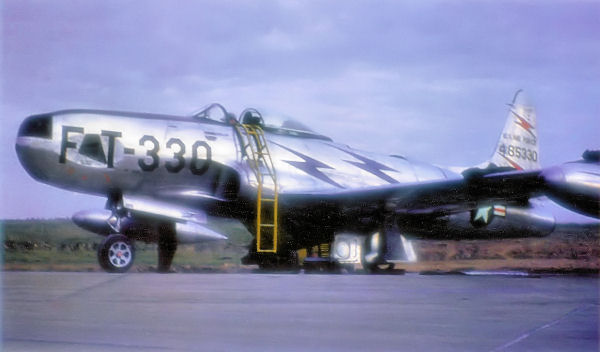
Lockheed P/RF-80A-15-LO Shooting Star Serial 44-85330 of the 38th Tac Recon Squadron / 10th TRW

On 9 July 1952 the 10th Tactical Reconnaissance Wing was activated in Europe, being reassigned from Pope Army Air Field, North Carolina. The squadrons of the 117th TRW were redesignated as follows:

- 1st Tactical Reconnaissance (RB-26C) (Formerly 112th TRS)
- 38th Tactical Reconnaissance (RF-80A) (Formerly 157th TRS)

The 10th Tactical Reconnaissance Wing was designated as the successor of the World War II 10th Reconnaissance Group, being awarded its lineage and honors. The 10th RG was previously stationed at Fürstenfeldbruck in 1947.

With the re-designation of the 117th TRW, it was found that runway conditions at Toul Air Base were still considered to be unsatisfactory for safe operations of jet aircraft, however the base in France was completed enough for the operation of propeller aircraft. Therefore, the RF-80 equipped 32nd TRS remained at Fürstenfeldbruck in a deployed status, while the propeller-driven RB-26's of the 1st TRS were reassigned to Toul.

The 32nd TRS' RF-80s were repainted with red lightning bolts were painted on their vertical stabilizers, and blue lightning flashes were painted on the center fuselage and wing tip tanks.

The 32nd TRS remained at Fürstenfeldbruck until 9 May 1953 when the 10 TRW was reassigned to Spangdahlem Air Base in Germany as part of a USAFE reorganization.

==== 7330th Flying Training Wing ====
In November 1953, the 7330th Flying Training Wing was activated at Fürstenfeldbruck. The mission of the Wing was to provide upgrading and instructor training for students of MAP (Mutual Assistance Pact) – recipient countries in T-33 trainers; to operate and maintain Fürstenfeldbruck Air Base; provide administrative and logistical support for tenant units; prepare for the reception and provide necessary support for tactical units using Fürstenfeldbruck as a staging base; and to operate and maintain the Siegenburg gunnery range.

In 1955 the French, British and American occupation of Germany ended and permission was given to the West German government to re-establish its armed forces.

=== Use by the Armed forces of Germany ===
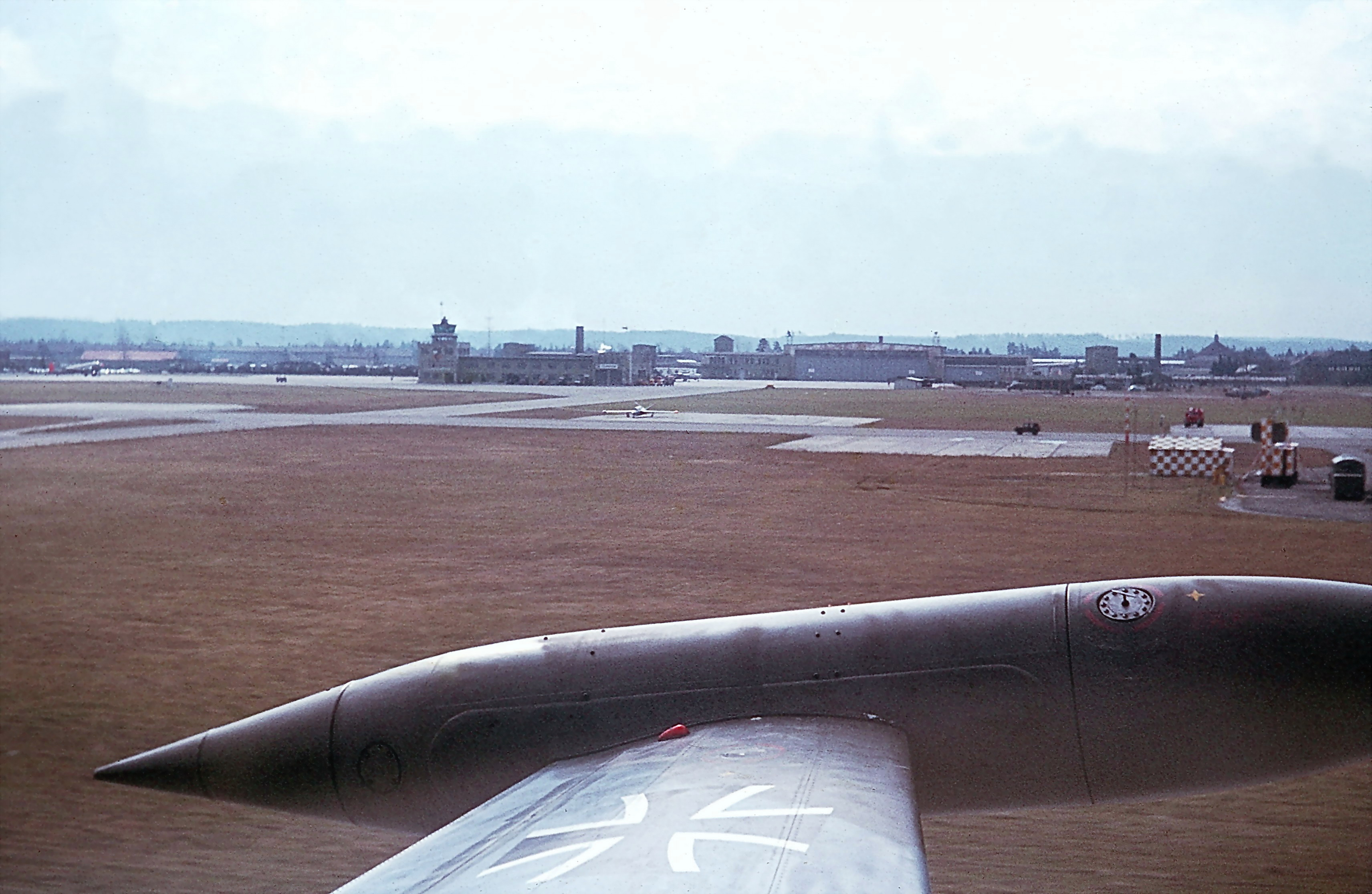
Lockheed T-33 during initial climb. In the foreground on the right, the GCA “trailer” (Radar approach control unit)

With the establishment of the Bundeswehr, Fürstenfeldbruck became the “cradle of the Luftwaffe”—in part because the first ten German pilots received their wings there on September 24, 1956,while the first 20 operational F-84F aircraft were handed over to the Luftwaffe two months later. In December 1957, the U.S. Air Force transferred the airfields Erding, Kaufbeuren, Landsberg, and Fürstenfeldbruck to the “German Air Force” during a ceremonial parade attended by U.S. Ambassador Bruce and General Everest, as well as Federal Minister of Defense Strauß and Lieutenant General Kammhuber on the German side. The handover of the air bases, which had been largely restored by the Americans, took place on December 14, 1957. As a result, Fursty received all flight operations units — the control tower, base operations (“Flight OPS”), and the mobile radar approach control located next to the runway.

In 1957 Fürstenfeldbruck Air Base became a joint-use facility with the new West German Air Force, which was celebrated in May 1957 with an air show on "Armed Forces Day". Participants included the US Air Force’s Acrojets, flying T-33As and the RAF’s Black Arrows, flying Hawker Hunter F.6s with the Trebel One Squadron,” and the Italian “Getti Tonanti” (Thundering Rays) flying F-84Gs. The joint-use continued until 1958 with the 7330th wing, then the organization was redesigned as the 7367th Flying Training Group until it was discontinued in 1960.

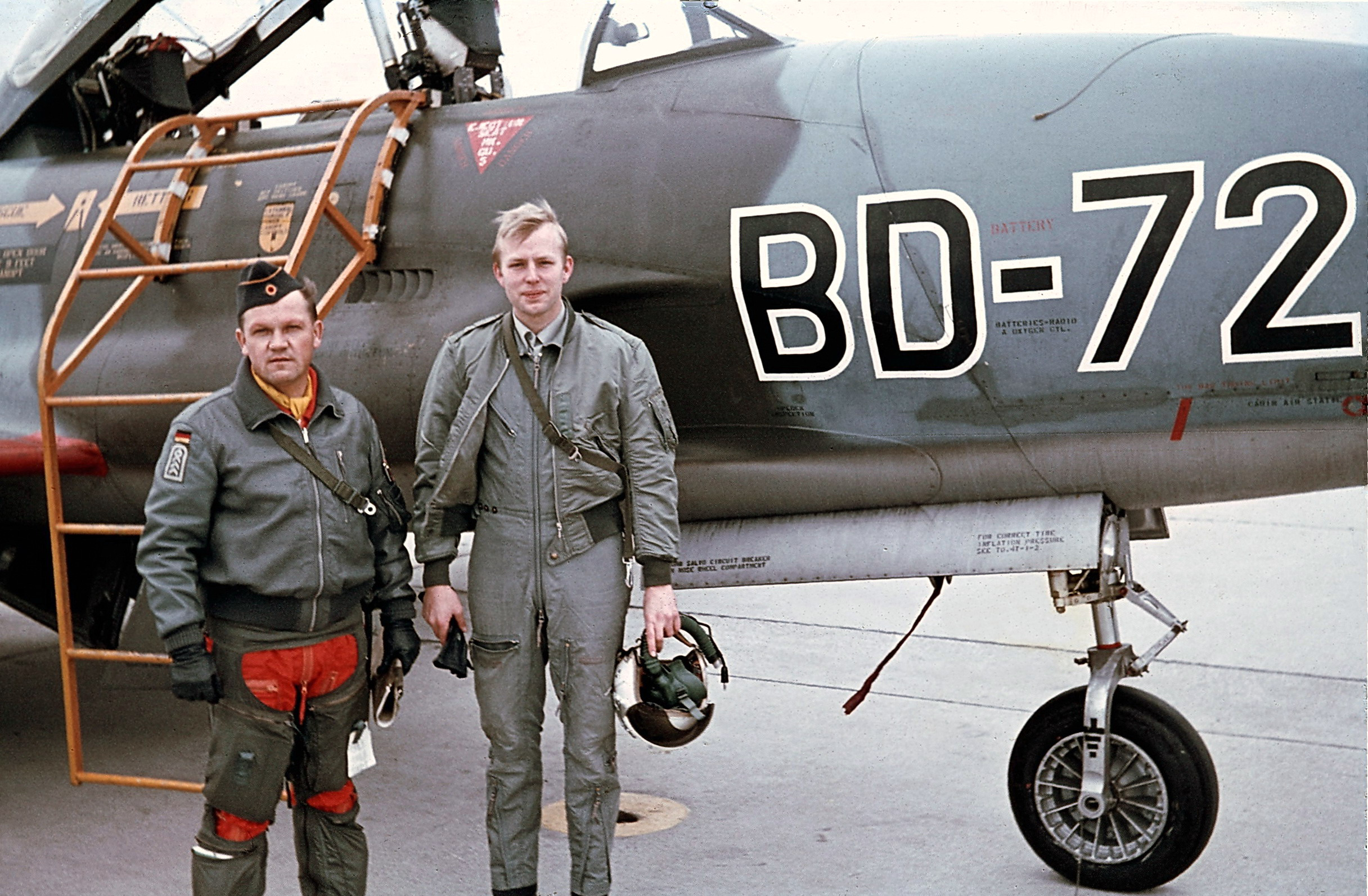
Luftwaffe flight instructor Karock (left) and ATC Riemann before a T-33 takeoff

All of the flight operation units that were taken over remained in service until the 1960s. The “Fursty Tower” erected in 1948, initially intended as a temporary measure, became a “permanent installation” over the years. It was decided to bolt supports between the green panes to prevent them from falling out of their frames during storms. The GCA “trailer” still changed its position depending on wind/approach direction, and was finally relocated to the IFR room in the control tower in the early 1970s, along with modern radar equipment. The standard approach procedures using the non-directional radio beacon west of Mammendorf remained unchanged.

As additional measures to improve flight safety in Munich’s congested airspace, a direct communication link was established in the 1960s between the civilian air traffic control center in Munich-Riem and the military air traffic control center at Fürstenfeldbruck Air Base. In addition, air traffic control personnel at Fursty were required—after undergoing a medical examination and receiving training in the cockpit and on the ejection seat—to participate in jet training flights on a rotating basis.

In July 1958, in connection with the 1958 Lebanon Crisis, the U.S. Air Force used the airfield to transport troops (U.S. Army Task Force 210) to Adana Air Base in Turkey and from there to Beirut. In 1961, there were 19 independent units on the air base grounds.

In 1964, the German Air Force Weapons School 50 (WaSLw 50) was relocated from Erding Air Base to Fürstenfeldbruck. Since Bundeswehr aircraft—particularly Lockheed F-104 Starfighters—often flew quite low over the eastern neighborhood of Pasing while approaching Fürstenfeldbruck Air Base, complaints arose from that Munich district.

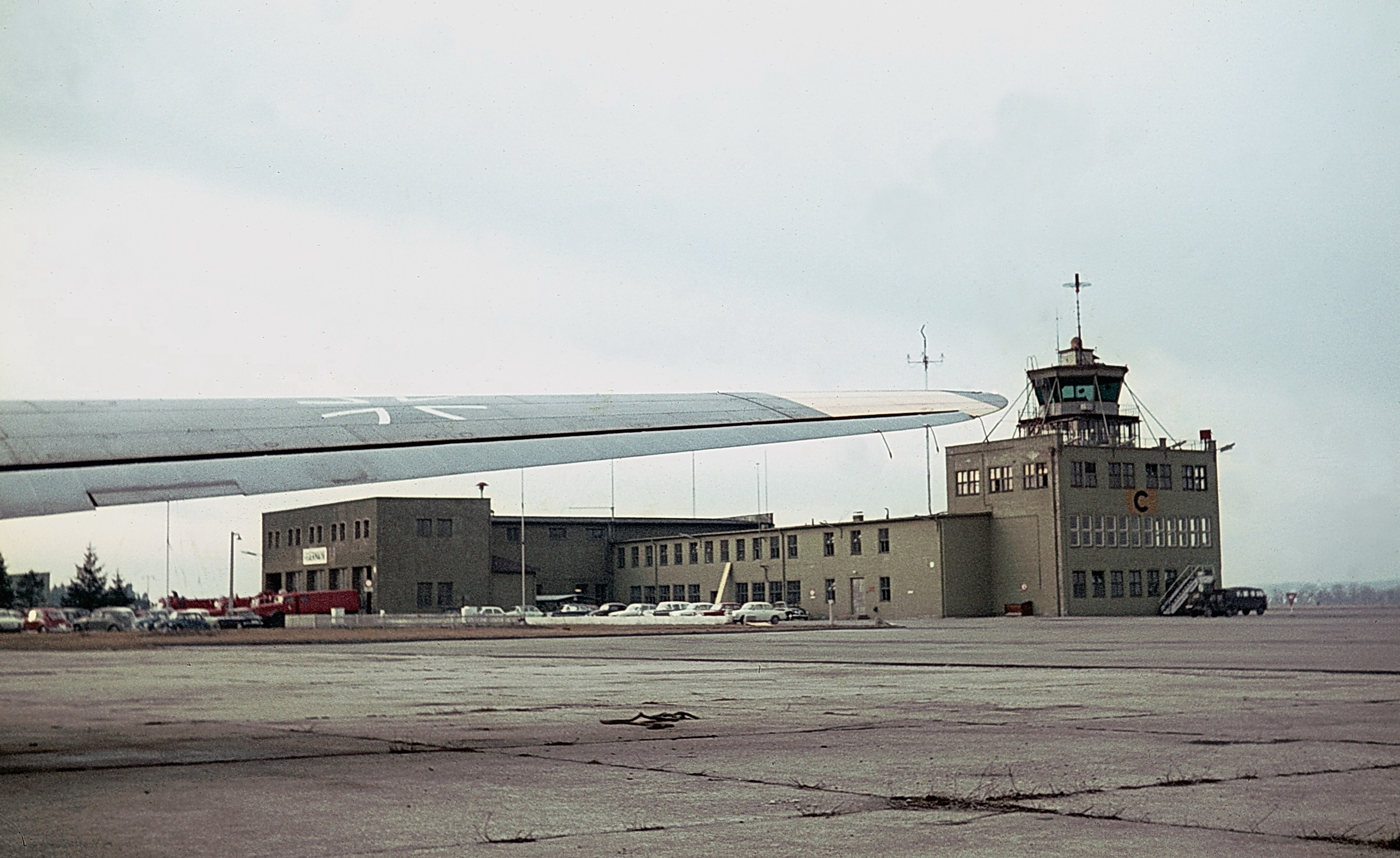
"Fursty" air operations building with control tower (1966)

An important function of the “Fursty” air base during the Cold War was serving as a stopover point, such as during the 1965 “Eastern Express” military exercise, which was conducted using U.S. Air Force Starlifters. Another operation was a formation flight in the late 1980s involving six C-141B Starlifter aircraft using the “Speechless Procedure,” which began with the engines being started at McChord Air Force Base in the state of Washington. After flying over Canada, England, and the Netherlands, paratroopers were dropped in the Schongau area.

In preparation for the 1972 Summer Olympics in Munich, the Bundeswehr administration carried out construction measures to relieve congestion at Riem Airport caused by charter traffic associated with the Games.

=== 1972 Munich Olympics ===
During the 1972 Summer Olympics the Munich-Riem Airport was restricted for a short time for security reasons. Some civilian commercial tourist flights came into Fürstenfeldbruck instead during the Olympics. There was an extraordinarily heavy army presence on the base, with armoured vehicles escorting aircraft on landing and automatic weapons in common sight in the Terminal, something unheard of at this time. A military brass band was playing in the terminal to calm tourists' nerves at the sight of this extraordinary security.

=== Munich Massacre ===
Video installation at the memory space for the victims of the Munich massacre showing a Federal Border Guard helicopter in front of Fursty „Base Ops”

On September 5, 1972, eight Palestinian terrorists from the group Black September took eleven members of the Israeli Olympic team hostage. Two hostages were murdered in one of the Israeli apartments in the Olympic Village. After lengthy negotiations with Olympic and government officials, the Palestinians demanded transport to Cairo via Munich-Riem Airport, but negotiators convinced them to take their nine surviving hostages to the Fürstenfeldbruck Air Base instead. The eight terrorists and their nine remaining Israeli hostages were transported in two helicopters from the Olympic Village to Fürstenfeldbruck, where a Boeing 727 was waiting. Five German police snipers, with no specialist terrorist training, hidden at the control tower, proceeded to engage the Palestinians in an attempt to free the hostages. In the ensuing gun battle on the tarmac all nine Israeli hostages and one German police officer were killed. All of the hostages were killed while they were still tied up in the helicopters. Since the massacre, there has been much criticism levelled at the German authorities for the way they planned and executed the rescue attempt. The year after the event, in response to the hostage crisis, West German government founded GSG9 a counter-terrorism and special operations unit of the German Federal Police.

In 1974, construction began on a new building complex for the Air Force Officer School; in addition, a second, shorter runway was built parallel to and slightly north of the existing one.

In 1978, the Luftwaffe Weapons School 50 was renamed Fighter-Bomber Wing 49. The first of 175 Alpha Jets entered service a year later. Fighter-Bomber Wing 49 was the first and last unit to fly this model. The last air show took place on October 12, 1985, to mark the 50th anniversary.

=== End of Military Use ===
With the end of the Cold War, the size of the Bundeswehr was reduced. As a result, Fighter-Bomber Wing 49 was decommissioned on March 31, 1994 and later reorganized as the Fürstenfeldbruck Flight Training Group. On June 30, 1997, with its dissolution, regular flight operations using the airfield’s own Alpha Jets came to an end. After that, the airfield was used intermittently for the stationing of military aircraft and for military exchange operations. The German Air Force finally ceased military flight operations at Fürstenfeldbruck on September 30, 2003, and disbanded the subunits necessary for flight operations. On December 12, 2005, military jets landed at Fürstenfeldbruck for the last time.
