= 125th Fighter Squadron =

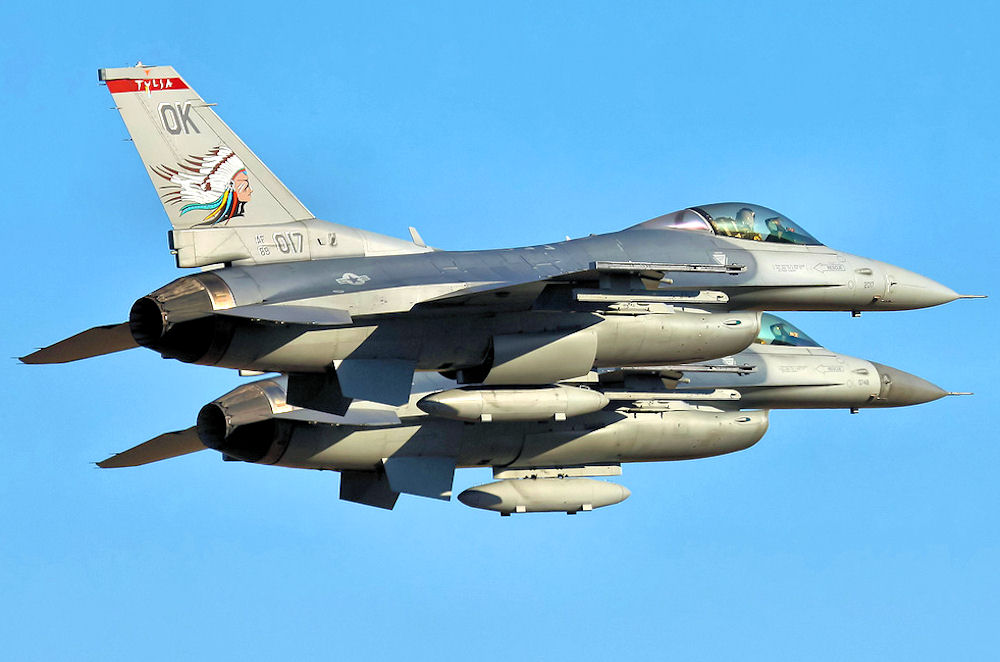
- 125th Fighter Squadron F-16C Fighting Falcons (Note: Aircraft in foreground is General Dynamics F-16C Block 42E Fighting Falcon, serial 89-2017.)
- Active: 1941–1945; 1947–1952; 1952–1973; 1973–present
- Country: United States
- Allegiance: Oklahoma
- Branch: Air National Guard
- Type: Squadron
- Role: Attack
- Part of: Oklahoma Air National Guard
- Garrison/HQ: Tulsa Air National Guard Base, Oklahoma
- Nickname: "Tulsa Vipers"
- Decorations: Belgian Fourragère

Insignia
- 125th Fighter Squadron emblem

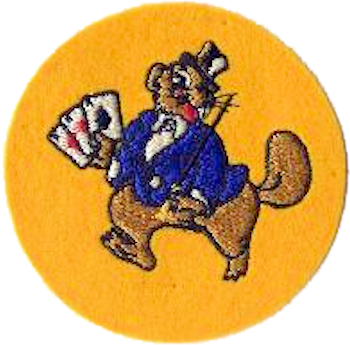
- 125th Liaison Squadron emblem (Note: Approved 15 September 1943.)
- Tail code: OK
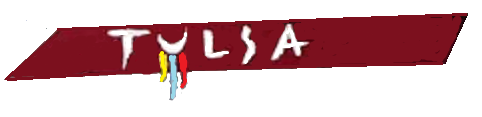
- Tail stripe

The 125th Fighter Squadron is a unit of the Oklahoma Air National Guard 138th Fighter Wing located at Tulsa Air National Guard Base, Oklahoma. The 125th is equipped with the Block 42 F-16C Fighting Falcon.

The squadron is a descendant organization of the 125th Observation Squadron, established on 30 July 1940. It was one of the 29 original National Guard Observation Squadrons of the United States Army National Guard formed before World War II.

== History ==
The Oklahoma Air National Guard originated during the pre World War II formation of Army National Guard aviation units. In July 1940 the War Department allotted the 125th Observation Squadron to the Oklahoma National Guard. Organized in Tulsa, the squadron was equipped with 0-38 aircraft. It was federally recognized on 31 January 1941.

=== World War II ===
Seven months after its federal recognition, the 125th Observation Squadron was federalized and ordered into active service on 15 September 1941. The 125th was assigned to the 68th Observation Group at Fort Sill. In March 1942 the unit was transferred to the 77th Observation Group. It operated as the 125th Observation Squadron (Light) until July 1942, when it was again designated the 125th Observation Squadron. During the remainder of 1942 it trained with various aircraft at Fort Sill and other installations. In April 1943 the 125th was renamed the 125th Liaison Squadron. Transferred to Texas, it joined the Second Air Force Support Command and was re-equipped with L-5 Sentinel aircraft. In January 1944 the squadron became a part of the 76th Tactical Reconnaissance Group.

The 125th arrived in England in June 1944 and was assigned to the Ninth Air Force. Deployed to the U.S. Ninth Army, units of the 125th arrived in France in August 1944 and served with the Twelfth and Sixth army groups. In November 1944 the 125th was assigned to the XIX Tactical Air Command (Provisional) and then to the IX Fighter Command. After V-E Day the 125th was transferred to the XII Tactical Air Command of the Army of Occupation.

=== Oklahoma Air National Guard ===
The wartime 125th Liaison Squadron was re-designated as the 125th Fighter Squadron and allotted to the Oklahoma Air National Guard, on 24 May 1946. It was organized at Tulsa Municipal Airport, Oklahoma, and was extended federal recognition on 15 February 1947 by the National Guard Bureau. The 1125th Fighter Squadron was bestowed the history, honors, and colors of the 125th Liaison Squadron and all predecessor units. The squadron was equipped with F-51D Mustang Fighters and was assigned to the Missouri ANG 71st Fighter Wing, an umbrella unit of early ANG units in the midwest. The squadron was assigned the mission for air defense of the State of Oklahoma.

On 18 December 1947, the 125th FS was transferred to the newly recognized Oklahoma ANG 137th Fighter Group and joined the 185th Fighter Squadron at Norman. The Norman-based 137th Fighter Group provided command and logistical support. The 125th then performed training missions over Northern Oklahoma and the panhandle; the 188th trained over Southern Oklahoma to the Texas border.

In June 1950, the 125th began re-equipping from F-51D Mustangs to F-84B Thunderjets. The F-84s were received from Republic after refurbishing, the aircraft seeing previous service with the 14th or 20th Fighter Groups.

=== Korean War federalization ===
The 125th and its parent 137th Fighter Group were federalized and ordered to active service on 10 October 1950 due to the Korean War, becoming part of Ninth Air Force, Tactical Air Command (TAC). On 27 November 1950, it was moved to Alexandria AFB, Louisiana, where it was joined with the Kansas ANG 127th Fighter Squadron and Georgia ANG 128th Fighter Squadron. The 137th Fighter-Bomber Wing was scheduled for deployment to the new Chaumont-Semoutiers AB, France, as part of the United States Air Forces in Europe (USAFE).

At Alexandria, the unit was scheduled for conversion training in the F-84G Thunderjet. Deployment of the wing was delayed, however, by the need to transfer its pilots to Korea from training and delays in receiving engines for the F-84Gs, as well as the ongoing construction at Chaumont AB. As no F-84Gs were available, F-84Ds were furnished by TAC and along with the F-84Bs, the unit trained in the jet aircraft.

Training and delays continued throughout 1951. Due to these delays, many of the activated National Guard airmen were released from active duty and never deployed to France. F-84G models were finally received in the spring of 1951 and the Guardsmen were able to train in long-range endurance missions. However, ongoing delays in France kept the 137th in Louisiana for over a year.

With mostly regular Air Force personnel and all the delays behind them, the remaining Guardsmen departed Louisiana on 5 May 1952 for Europe; however, the 128th inherited a base that was little more than acres of mud where wheat fields used to be. The only hardened facilities at Chaumont were a concrete runway and a handful of tarpaper shacks. The 127th wound up being stationed by USAFE at Neubiberg Air Base, West Germany until the facilities in France were suitable for military use. The aircraft arrived at Chaumont on 25 June, being the first USAF tactical air fighters to be based permanently in France, albeit working mostly in tents and temporary wooden buildings on their new base.

The Guardsmen of the 125th ended their active-duty tour in France and returned to the United States in late June, leaving their F-84G Thunderjets in Europe.

=== Air Defense mission ===
The 125th returned from France and was reformed in Tulsa in July 1952, being assigned to Tactical Air Command as a Fighter-Bomber squadron. It was re-equipped with F-51D Mustangs, owing to the lack of jet aircraft available. The squadron continued to train in the Mustang until 1954 when obsolescent F-80C Shooting Star jets were received.

In 1957 the Oklahoma Air National Guard was given a fighter-interceptor mission in Air Defense Command (ADC), and on 1 August, the 125th Fighter-Bomber Squadron was authorized to expand to a group level. The 138th Fighter Group was authorized and extended federal recognition by the National Guard Bureau. The 125th Fighter-Interceptor Squadron becoming the group's flying unit. Other elements assigned into the group were the 138th group headquarters, 138th Material Squadron (maintenance and supply), 138th Air Base Squadron, and the 138th USAF Dispensary.

With the fighter-interceptor mission assignment, the 125th also assumed ADC runway alert program on full 24-hour basis – with armed jet fighters ready to "scramble" at a moment's notice. This event brought the group into the daily combat operational program of the USAF, placing us on "the end of the runway" alongside regular USAF air defense fighter squadrons. The obsolescent F-80 day fighters were upgraded to the all-weather/day/night F-86D Sabre Interceptor by the end of the year. In June 1959 the squadron traded their F-86Ds for the upgraded F-86L Sabre Interceptor with uprated afterburning engines and new electronics.

=== Air Transport mission ===
In January 1960, the 125th FIS was reassigned to Military Air Transport Service, trading in its Sabre interceptors for 4-engined C-97 Stratofreighter transports. With air transportation recognized as a critical wartime need, the unit was re-designated the 138th Air Transport Wing (Heavy) with the 125th Air Transport Squadron. During the 1961 Berlin Crisis, both the Group and squadron were federalized on 1 October 1961. From Tulsa, the 125th ATS augmented MATS airlift capability worldwide in support of the Air Force's needs. It returned again to Oklahoma state control on 31 August 1962. Throughout the 1960s, the 125th flew long-distance transport missions in support of Air Force requirements, frequently sending aircraft to the Caribbean, Europe, Australia, Hawaii, Japan, the Philippines, and during the Vietnam War, to both South Vietnam, Okinawa and Thailand. The C-97s were retired in 1968 and the unit was transferred to Military Airlift Command (MAC), being re-equipped with C-124C Globemaster II heavy transports. The Group continued to fly long-distance intercontinental airlift flights until the Globemasters were retired at the end of 1972.

=== Tactical Fighter mission ===
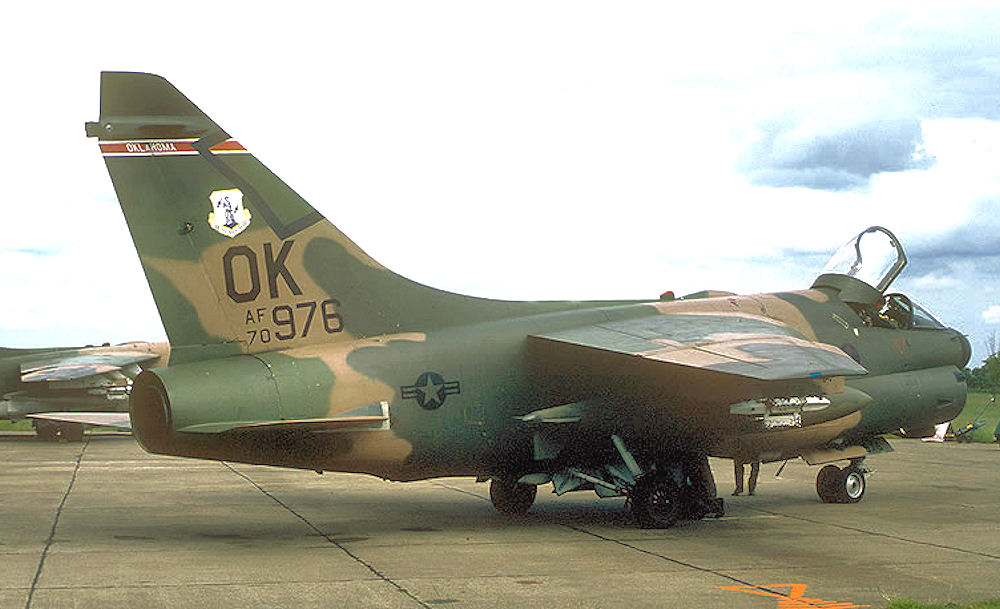
125th Tactical Fighter Squadron A-7D Corsair II 70-976, about 1981

With the retirement of the Globemasters, the 125th was transferred to Tactical Air Command on 25 January 1973, with the 125th Tactical Fighter Squadron being re-equipped with veteran F-100D/F Super Sabre tactical fighter bombers that were returning from the Vietnam War. The Super Sabre was dedicated fighter-bomber, with no concession being made to a secondary air-superiority role and the squadron trained in using the fighter for ground support. Beginning in 1975, the 125th began a NATO commitment, with squadron aircraft and personnel deploying to the United States Air Forces in Europe (USAFE) for Autumn Forge/Cold Fire/Reforger exercises.

In 1978, the F-100s were being retired, and they were replaced with A-7D Corsair II subsonic tactical close air support aircraft from the 23d Tactical Fighter Wing, England AFB, Louisiana along with the 354th Tactical Fighter Wing, Myrtle Beach AFB, South Carolina which were converting to the A-10 Thunderbolt II. The aircraft had excellent accuracy with the aid of an automatic electronic navigation and weapons delivery system. Although designed primarily as a ground attack aircraft, it also had limited air-to-air combat capability. In 1980, the 125th received the new twin-seat A-7K trainer and also received the Low Altitude Night Attack modification to the A-7D.

=== Modern era ===
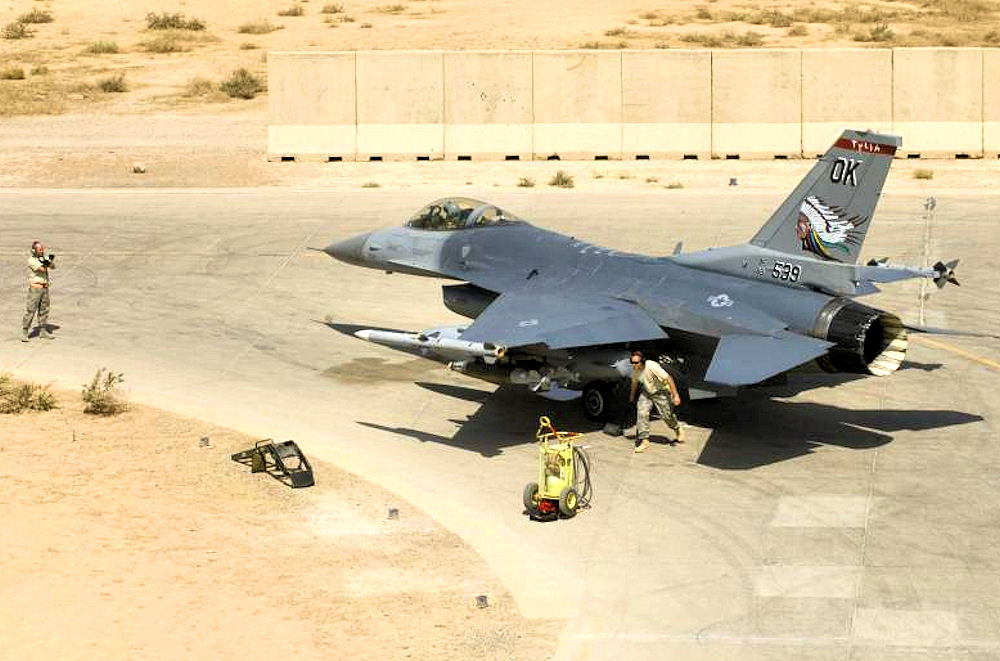
125th Expeditionary Fighter Squadron F-16C Fighting Falcon prepares to take off from Balad AB, Iraq, on 30 Sep 2008 (Note: Aircraft is General Dynamics F-16C Block 42D Fighting Falcon, serial 88-0539.)

Early in the 1990s with the declared end of the Cold War and the continued decline in military budgets, the Air Force restructured to meet changes in strategic requirements, decreasing personnel, and a smaller infrastructure. The 138th Group adopted the new USAF "Objective Organization" in early 1992, with the word "tactical" being eliminated from its designation and becoming the 138th Fighter Group. Tactical Air Command was inactivated on 1 June, being replaced by the new Air Combat Command (ACC).

The 125th Fighter Squadron flew A-7D's until 1993 when it began to receive Block 42 F-16C/D Fighting Falcons, replacing the venerable A-7D in the attack roles. Most of these aircraft came from the 51st Fighter Wing, Osan Air Base, South Korea and the 20th Fighter Wing, Shaw Air Force Base, South Carolina, which units' were trading in Block 42 for more advanced F-16s. The 125th, although an Air National Guard unit, which were mostly tasked with air defense of US mainland, was tasked with a conventional attack mission. This was already the case in the A-7D and even in the F-100 era. The squadron was one of the first Air National Guard units to be equipped with the Low Altitude Navigation and Targeting Infrared for Night, or LANTIRN system to be able to illuminate their own ground targets. At the time of conversion this unit was one of the most advanced within the Air National Guard.

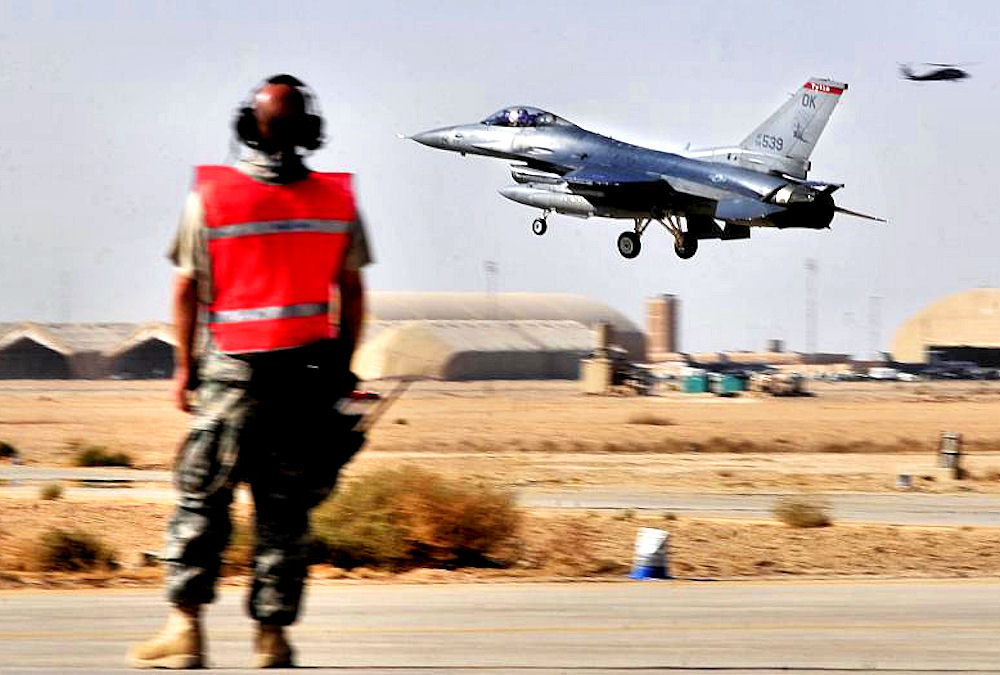
125th Expeditionary Fighter Squadron F-16C Fighting Falcon arrives in Iraq on 4 October 2011 (Note: Aircraft is General Dynamics F-16C Block 42D Fighting Falcon, serial 88-0539. The squadron deployed in support of Operation New Dawn.)

In mid-1996, the Air Force, in response to budget cuts, and changing world situations, began experimenting with Air Expeditionary organizations. The Air Expeditionary Force (AEF) concept was developed that would mix Active-Duty, Reserve and Air National Guard elements into a combined force. Instead of entire permanent units deploying as "Provisional" as in the 1991 Gulf War, Expeditionary units are composed of "aviation packages" from several wings, including active-duty Air Force, the Air Force Reserve Command and the Air National Guard, would be married together to carry out the assigned deployment rotation.

In October 1996, the 125th Expeditionary Fighter Squadron was first formed from squadron personnel and aircraft and deployed to Incirlik Air Base, Turkey, to join with other active-duty and national guard squadrons as part of Operation Northern Watch. This mission was part of a multi-unit Air National Guard "rainbow" deployment involving the Air National Guard block 42 F-16 squadrons. Each squadron provided eight aircraft to a total of 24 aircraft deployed. The 125th EFS returned to Tulsa and was inactivated on 7 January 1997. Further Northern Watch activations of the 125th and subsequent deployments to Incirlik AB occurred in the spring of 1998 and fall of 2001.

The 125th Expeditionary Fighter Squadron has also been deployed to Ahmad al-Jaber Air Base, Kuwait for Operation Southern Watch in 2001, and to Balad Air Base, Iraq in 2007 and 2008 as part of Operation Iraqi Freedom. In 2011, the 125th Squadron deployed to Al Assad Iraq for the final time, when more than 200 members deployed there to provide air support to the final drawdown of U.S. and coalition forces, being able to respond quickly to any needs troops in combat may have as they left the country.

Between July and August 2024, six F-16s from the 125th FS deployed to Łask Air Base, Poland, as part of the 52nd Operations Group Det 1 Aviation Detachment Rotation.

=== Lineage ===
125th Military Airlift Squadron

- Designated as the 125th Observation Squadron and allotted to the National Guard on 30 July 1940

Activated on 10 February 1941
Ordered into active service on 15 September 1941
Redesignated 125th Observation Squadron (Light) on 13 January 1942
Redesignated 125th Observation Squadron on 4 July 1942
Redesignated 125th Liaison Squadron on 2 April 1943
Inactivated on 15 December 1945

- Redesignated 125th Fighter Squadron, Single Engine and allotted to the National Guard on 24 May 1946

Extended federal recognition on 15 February 1947
Redesignated 125th Fighter Squadron, Jet on 1 March 1950
Federalized and ordered to active service on 10 October 1950
Redesignated 125th Fighter-Bomber Squadron on 1 November 1950
Inactivated, released from active duty and returned to Oklahoma state control on 10 July 1952
Redesignated 125th Fighter-Interceptor Squadron on 1 August 1957
Redesignated 125th Air Transport Squadron on 15 January 1960
Federalized and ordered to active service on 1 October 1961
Released from active duty and returned to Oklahoma state control on 31 August 1962
Redesignated 125th Military Airlift Squadron on 1 January 1966
Inactivated on 24 January 1973
Consolidated with the 125th Tactical Fighter Squadron on 18 August 1987

125th Fighter Squadron
Constituted as the 125th Tactical Fighter Squadron
Activated on 25 January 1973
Consolidated with the 125th Military Airlift Squadron on 18 August 1987
Redesignated 125th Fighter Squadron on 15 March 1992

=== Assignments ===
- Oklahoma National Guard, 10 February 1941
- 68th Observation Group, 15 September 1941
- 77th Observation Group (later 77th Reconnaissance Group), 12 March 1942
- II Air Support Command (later II Tactical Air Division), 11 August 1943
- III Tactical Air Division (later I Tactical Air Division), c. 11 October 1943 (attached to 76th Tactical Reconnaissance Group until Jan 1944
- United States Strategic Air Forces in Europe, 4 June 1944
- Ninth Air Force, 7 June 1944

Attached principally to Headquarters Command, European Theater of Operations, 7 Jun-17 Jul 1944
Attached to United States Ninth Army, 17 Jul-15 Nov 1944
Attached to XXIX Tactical Air Command [Prov] beginning 15 November 1944

- IX Fighter Command, 1 December 1944

Attached to XXIX Tactical Air Command [Prov]
Further attached to Twelfth Army Group, 15 Nov 1944 – 8 Jun 1945
Principally attached to Sixth Army Group, 8 Jun-25 Jul 1945

- XII Tactical Air Command, 20 Jun-15 Dec 1945

Attached to Headquarters Command, US Forces, European Theater, 25 Jul-15 Dec 1945

- 71st Fighter Wing, 15 February 1947
- 137th Fighter Group (later 137th Fighter-Bomber Group), 18 December 1947
- 138th Fighter Group (later 138th Air Transport Group, 138th Military Airlift Group), 1 August 1957 – 24 January 1973 (attached to 133d Air Transport Wing, 1 October 1961 – 31 August 1962)
- 138th Tactical Fighter Group (later 138th Fighter Group), 25 January 1973
- 138th Operations Group, 1 October 1995 – present

=== Stations ===
- Tulsa Municipal Airport, Oklahoma, 10 February 1941
- Post Field, Oklahoma, 20 September 1941
- Brownwood Army Air Field, Texas 15 April 1942
- Abilene Army Air Field, Texas, 29 June 1942
- DeRidder Army Air Base, Louisiana, 26 July 1942
- Abilene Army Air Field, Texas, 27 September 1942
- Alamo Field, Texas, 1 July 1943
- Desert Center Army Air Field, California, 11 October 1943
- Thermal Army Air Field, California, 11 Nov 1943 – 18 May 1944
- RAF Staverton, England, c. 8 June 1944
- RAF Chedworth, England, 19 June 1944
- RAF Erlestokes, England, 9 July 1944

Detachments operated from France after 23 August 1944

- St Sauveur-Lendelin Airfield, France, 1 September 1944
- Rennes Airfield (A-27), France, 3 September 1944
- Arlon Airfield, Belgium, c. 1 October 1944
- Maastricht Airfield (Y-44), Holland, 21 October 1944
- Munchen-Gladbach Airfield (Y-56), Germany, 9 March 1945
- Haltern Airfield, Germany, 4 April 1945
- Gütersloh Airfield (Y-99), Germany, 12 April 1945
- Brunswick/Waggum Airfield (R-37), Germany, 24 April 1945
- AAF Station Heidelberg, Germany, 10 June 1945
- AAF Station Frankfurt, Germany, 25 July–15 December 1945
- Tulsa Municipal Airport, Oklahoma, 15 February 1947
- Alexandria Air Force Base, Louisiana, 27 November 1950 – 4 May 1952
- Chaumont-Semoutiers Air Base, France, 13 May 1952 – 10 July 1952
- Tulsa Municipal Airport, Oklahoma, 10 July 1952
- Tulsa International Airport (later Tulsa Air National Guard Base), 28 August 1963 – present

==== Major Deployments ====
- Korean War federalization
- 1961 Berlin Crisis federalization

Tulsa Municipal Airport, 1 October 1961 – 31 August 1962 (Did not deploy)

- Operation Northern Watch

Operated from Incirlik Air Base, Turkey, 9 October 1996 – 7 January 1997
Operated from Incirlik Air Base, Turkey, March–May 1998
Operated from Incirlik Air Base, Turkey, 1999
Operated from Incirlik Air Base, Turkey, September–October 2001

- Operation Southern Watch (AEF)

Operated from Prince Sultan Air Base, Saudi Arabia, 2000
Operated from Ahmad al-Jaber Air Base, Kuwait, 11 September–November 2001

- Operation Iraqi Freedom (AEF)

Operated from Al Udeid Air Base, Qatar, 20 May–July 2005
Operated from Balad Air Base, Iraq, 27 June–August 2007
Operated from Balad Air Base, Iraq, 18 September–November 2008

- Operation New Dawn (AEF)

Operated from Undisclosed location, Iraq, 28 September-18 November 2011

=== Aircraft ===
- Douglas O-38E, 1941–1942
- O-49 Vigilant, 1941–1943
- O-59 Grasshopper, 1941–1943
- O-58C Grasshopper, 1941–1943
- North American O-47, 1942
- O-52 Owl, 1942
- L-5 Grasshopper, 1943–1945
- F-51D Mustang, 1947–1950; 1952–1954
- F-84B Thunderjet, 1950–1951
- F-84D Thunderjet, 1950–1951
- F-84G Thunderjet, 1951–1952
- F-80C Shooting Star, 1954–1957
- F-86D Sabre Interceptor, 1957–1959
- F-86L Sabre Interceptor, 1959–1960
- C-97G Stratofreighter, 1960–1968
- C-124C Globemaster II, 1968–1973
- F-100D/F Super Sabre, 1973–1978
- A-7D/K Corsair II, 1978–1993
- Block 42 F-16C/D Fighting Falcon, 1993–Present

== See also ==
- List of observation squadrons of the United States Army National Guard
