= II Air Support Command =

- Active: 1941-1945
- Country: United States
- Branch: United States Army; United States Air Force
- Role: Command of tactical air support units

The II Air Support Command is an inactive United States Air Force unit. It was last assigned to Third Air Force at Biggs Field, Texas, as the II Tactical Air Division, where it was inactivated on 22 December 1945.

The command was organized in September 1941 as the 2nd Air Support Command to control the tactical units of 2d Air Force.

== History ==
General Headquarters Air Force reorganized its four regional air districts as Numbered Air Forces in the spring of 1941. By the fall of that year, each of these had organized as a support command and three combat commands.

In the summer of 1941 GHQ AF had decided to establish commands to direct its air support mission in each numbered air force, plus one additional command reporting directly to GHQ AF. These commands would be manned from inactivating wings, and would initially control only observation squadrons, which would be transferred from the control of the corps and divisions, although they would remain attached to these ground units. 2nd Air Force organized 2nd Air Support Command at Fort Douglas, Utah in September 1941, soon moving to Will Rogers Field, Oklahoma where it drew cadre and equipment from the 20th Bombardment Wing, which was simultaneously inactivated. New observation groups were formed, with a cadre drawn from National Guard squadrons that had been mobilized in 1940 and 1941.

However, by early 1942, the command's first commander, Hume Peabody, like two of the other commanders of air support commands had moved overseas, and similar demands led GHQ AF to believe it had little more than the "remnants" of the command remaining. However, in May, the Army Air Forces (AAF) reaffirmed that each of the continental numbered air forces would have an air support command and the command's manning was brought back up.

The AAF determined that its continental air forces would specialize in their training operations and air support training would be assigned to Third Air Force. As a result, in October of 1942, AAF directed that all but one of the observation groups assigned to the command were to be reduced to 50% strength with their personnel used to form new tow target squadrons, or transferred to heavy bomber Operational Training Unit (OTU)s or Replacement Training Unit (RTU)s. Further, the command, now titled the II Air Support Command, was reassigned to Third Air Force in January 1943.

In August 1943, the command was redesignated the II Tactical Air Division with the intent that the command would engage in combined training with army ground forces.

The unit participated in various air-ground maneuvers, supported ground units in training, and put on air support demonstrations.

== Lineage ==
- Constituted as 2nd Air Support Command on 21 August 1941 (Note: Maurer indicates unit was constituted as the "II" Air Support Command. However, the unit was constituted and activated with an arabic number in its name. The use of roman numerals to designate Army Air Forces combat commands did not begin until September 1942. "Air Force Historical Research Agency Organizational Reconds: Types of USAF Organizations". Air Force History Index. 9 January 2008.)

Activated on 1 September 1941
Redesignated 2nd Ground Air Support Command c. 30 April 1942
Redesignated II Air Support Command c. 18 September 1942
Redesignated II Tactical Air Division on 28 August 1943
Inactivated on 22 December 1945
Disbanded on 8 October 1948

=== Assignments ===
- Second Air Force, 21 August 1941
- Third Air Force, 25 January 1943
- III Tactical Air Command, 25 October 1945 – 22 December 1945

=== Components ===
Groups

- 48th Bombardment Group, 1 September 1941 – 2 May 1942
- 69th Observation Group (later 69th Reconnaissance Group), 7 September 1942 – 6 August 1943
- 71st Observation Group (later 71st Reconnaissance Group), 1 October 1941 – March 1942; August 1942 – c. 7 November 1943
- 72d Observation Group, 26 September 1941 – c. 18 January 1942
- 75th Observation Group, 12 March 1942 – c. 24 May 1942
- 77th Observation Group (later 77th Reconnaissance Group), 12 March – 24 May 1942; 7 September 1942 – 6 August 1943 (attached to III Ground Air Support Command [later, III Air Support Command] until 5 August 1943)
- 312th Bombardment Group, 15–16 March 1942
- 416th Bombardment Group, attached 1−22 November 1943

Squadrons

- 1st Observation Squadron (later 1st Reconnaissance Squadron), 1–26 Sep 1941; 24 May – 24 June 1944
- 2d Communications Squadron, Air Support: 1–31 May 1942
- 2d Composite Squadron, 8 November 1943 – 18 April 1944
- 3rd Observation Squadron, attached 12 August – 23 September 1942
- 5th Liaison Squadron, 12 October 1943 – 28 March 1944
- 6th Photographic Squadron, 29 March – 7 May 1942
- 15th Air Support Communications Squadron (later 15th Tactical Air Communications Squadron): 23 August 1943 – 20 April 1944
- 25th Liaison Squadron, 11 August – 19 November 1943 (attached to 71st Tactical Reconnaissance Group after 15 August 1943)
- 30th Army Reconnaissance Squadron (later 30th Observation Squadron), 1 September 1941 – 12 March 1942
- 37th Photographic Reconnaissance Squadron, 29 March – 12 Apr 1944
- 47th Liaison Squadron, 11 August 1943 – 4 April 1944
- 72d Liaison Squadron, 11 August 1943 – c. 14 June 1944
- 102d Observation Squadron, 1 September – 1 October 1941
- 108th Observation Squadron, 1–26 September 1941
- 110th Observation Squadron, 1 September – 1 October 1941
- 112th Observation Squadron, 1 September – 1 October 1941
- 115th Liaison Squadron, 11 August 1943 – 18 April 1944
- 124th Observation Squadron, 15–26 September 1941
- 125th Liaison Squadron, 11 August – c. 11 October 1943
- 128th Observation Squadron, 15 September – 1 October 1941
- 157th Liaison Squadron, 10 February – 18 April 1944
- 159th Liaison Squadron, 1 March – 18 April 1944
- 160th Liaison Squadron, 1–18 April 1944
- 162nd Liaison Squadron, 24 June 1944 – 1 September 1945
- 398th Fighter Squadron, 10 August – 1 September 1945

=== Stations ===
- Fort Douglas, Utah, 1 September 1941
- Will Rogers Field, Oklahoma, c. October 1941
- Birmingham Municipal Airport, Alabama, c. 1 April 1942
- Geiger Field, Washington, 26 May 1942
- Reno Army Air Base, Nevada, 27 May 1942
- Colorado Springs Army Air Base, Colorado, July 1942
- Barksdale Field, Louisiana, 15 March 1943
- DeRidder Army Air Base, Louisiana, c. 31 March 1944
- Stuttgart Army Air Field, Arkansas, February 1945
- Barksdale Field, Louisiana, c. 12 November 1945
- Biggs Field, Texas, c. 23 November-22 December 1945
