= 74th Reconnaissance Group =

- Active: 1942–1945, 1946-1949
- Country: United States
- Branch: United States Air Force
- Role: Reconnaissance
- Battle honours: American Theater of World War II

The 74th Reconnaissance Group is an inactive United States Air Force unit. It was last assigned to the 91st Air Division at Stewart Air Force Base, New York.

== History ==
The unit was first activated at Lawson Field, Georgia in February 1942 as the 74th Observation Group, shortly after the United States entered into World War II. However, the group's first operational squadrons, the 11th, the newly activated 13th, and the 22d Observation Squadrons were not assigned until the following month. The unit flew reconnaissance, mapping, artillery adjustment, bombing, dive bombing, and strafing missions to support ground units in training or on maneuvers. It trained personnel in aerial reconnaissance, medium bombardment, and fighter techniques throughout the war until it was inactivated in November 1945.

The group was reactivated in the reserves in 1946 at Stewart Field (later Stewart Air Force Base), New York. It was inactivated on 27 June 1949

== Lineage ==
- Constituted as 74th Observation Group on 5 February 1942

Activated on 27 February 1942
Redesignated as 74th Reconnaissance Group on 2 April 1943
Redesignated as 74th Tactical Reconnaissance Group on 11 August 1943
Inactivated on 7 November 1945.

- Redesignated 74th Reconnaissance Group, allotted to the reserve, and activated, on 27 December 1946

Inactivated on 27 June 1949.

=== Components ===
- 5th Observation Squadron (later 5th Liaison Squadron): (Note: This squadron is not related to the 5th Observation Squadron that is currently the 5th Reconnaissance Squadron.) 8 Aug 1942 – 25 Jan 1943; 2 Apr 1943 – 11 August 1943 (attached 11 August 1943 – 15 Sep 1943)
- 8th Tactical Reconnaissance Squadron: 15 July 1945 – 7 November 1945
- 11th Observation Squadron (later 11th Reconnaissance Squadron, 11th Tactical Reconnaissance Squadron): 21 March 1942 – 7 November 1945
- 13th Observation Squadron (later 13th Reconnaissance Squadron, 13th Tactical Reconnaissance Squadron): 2 March 1942 – 7 November 1945
- 21st Reconnaissance Squadron: 1 October 1947 – 27 June 1949
- 22d Observation Squadron (later 22d Reconnaissance Squadron, 22d Tactical Reconnaissance Squadron): 12 March 1942– 29 January 1945
- 22d Reconnaissance Squadron: (Note: This squadron is not related to the one previously listed. During World War II it was designated the 22d Photographic Reconnaissance Squadron.) 23 October 1947 – 27 June 1949
- 31st Reconnaissance Squadron (later 33d Reconnaissance Squadron): 13 November 1947– 27 June 1949
- 28th Reconnaissance Squadron (later 36th Photographic Mapping Squadron): 21 October 1943 – 29 March 1944
- 101st Bombardment Photographic Squadron: 29 January 1945 – 7 November 1945

=== Assignments ===
- 5th Air Support Command, 27 February 1942
- 3d Air Support Command (later III Ground Air Support Command, III Air Support Command), ca. April 1942
- IV Air Support Command, 28 December 1942
- III Reconnaissance Command (later III Tactical Air Command), ca. September 1943
- XIX Tactical Air Command, 25 October 1945 – 7 November 1945
- 91st Reconnaissance Wing (later 91st Air Division), 27 December 1946 – 27 June 1949

=== Stations ===
- Lawson Field, Georgia, 27 February 1942
- DeRidder Army Air Base, Louisiana, C. 14 April 1942
- Esler Field, Louisiana, c. 13 December 1942
- Desert Center Army Air Field, California, c. 28 December 1942
- Morris Field, North Carolina, September 1943
- Camp Campbell AAF, Kentucky, November 1943
- DeRidder Army Air Field, Louisiana, April 1944
- Stuttgart Army Air Field, Arkansas, February-7 November 1945
- Stewart Field, New York, 27 December 1946 – 27 June 1949.

=== Aircraft ===
- A-20, various
- A-26, 1945
- B-18, 1942–1943
- F-6 (P-51), 1945
- F-10 (B-25), 1944–1945
- L-1, 1942–1943
- L-3, 1942–1943
- L-4, 1942–1943
- L-5, 1944–1945
- L-6, 1942–1943
- O-52, 1942–1943
- P-39, 1943
- P-40, 1943–1944
- P-43, 1942-1943 (Note: Aircraft flown are based on the sources cited for individual squadrons. Not all squadrons flew the same aircraft while assigned to the group.)

=== Awards ===
- American Theater of World War II
