= III Tactical Air Division =

III Tactical Air Division may refer to:

- The IV Air Support Command, designated III Tactical Air Division from September 1943 to April 1944
- The III Reconnaissance Command, designated III Tactical Air Division from April 1944 to June 1945
