= 5th Liaison Squadron =

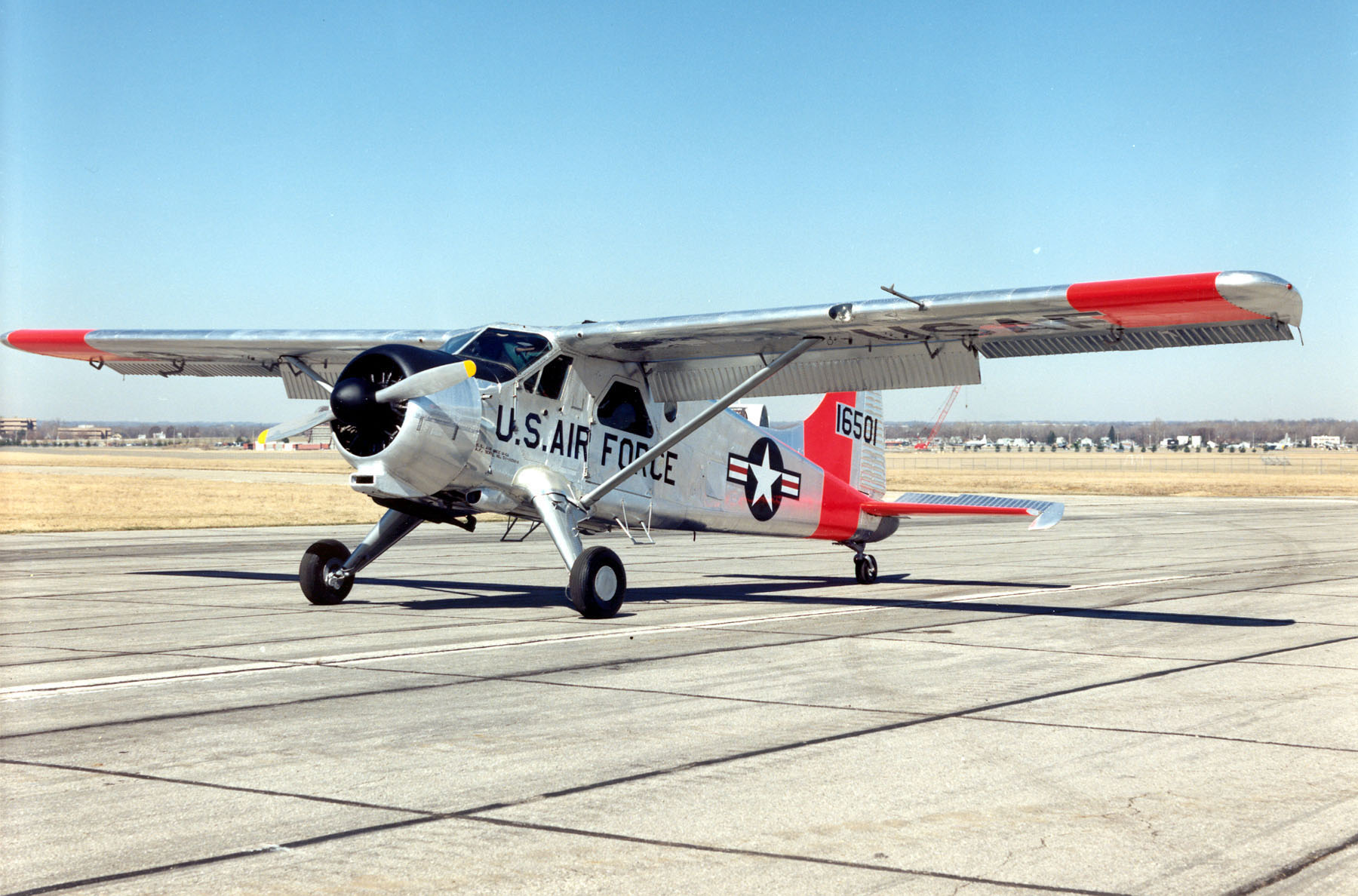
- L-20 Beaver, last aircraft operated by the squadron, in Arctic markings
- Active: 1942–1946; 1947–1949; 1949–1952; 1952–1954
- Country: United States
- Branch: United States Air Force
- Role: aerial reconnaissancereconnaissance and transport
- Nicknames: Jungle Angels (CBI, World War II)
- Engagements: China-Burma-India Theater

Insignia
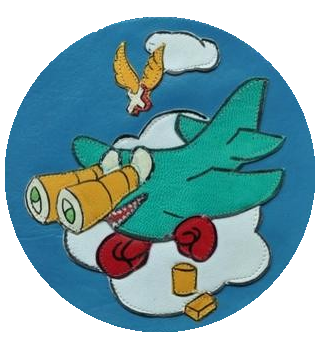
- 5 Liaison Sq emblem (Note: Approved 22 December 1944. Description: "On a pastel blue disc, edged black, a caricatured, dark green airplane in flight toward dexter, having shark's mouth red, with white teeth, yellow binoculars to the eyes, and wearing red boxing gloves on the landing gear, in front of a large white cloud formation, and dropping a yellow can and box toward base, all beneath a white cross, edged red, winged yellow, in chief, in front of a small white cloud formation.")

The 5th Liaison Squadron is an inactive United States Air Force unit. It was first activated during World War II as the 5th Observation Squadron. It served as a training unit for cooperation with field artillery until 1942, when that mission was assumed by the artillery. After training in the United States, it deployed to India in 1944, where it served in combat as the 5th Liaison Squadron until V-J Day, returning to the United States for inactivation in 1946. The squadron was active in the United States as a liaison and a helicopter unit. It was last active at Elmendorf Air Force Base, Alaska in 1954.

== History ==
=== World War II ===
==== Training in the United States ====
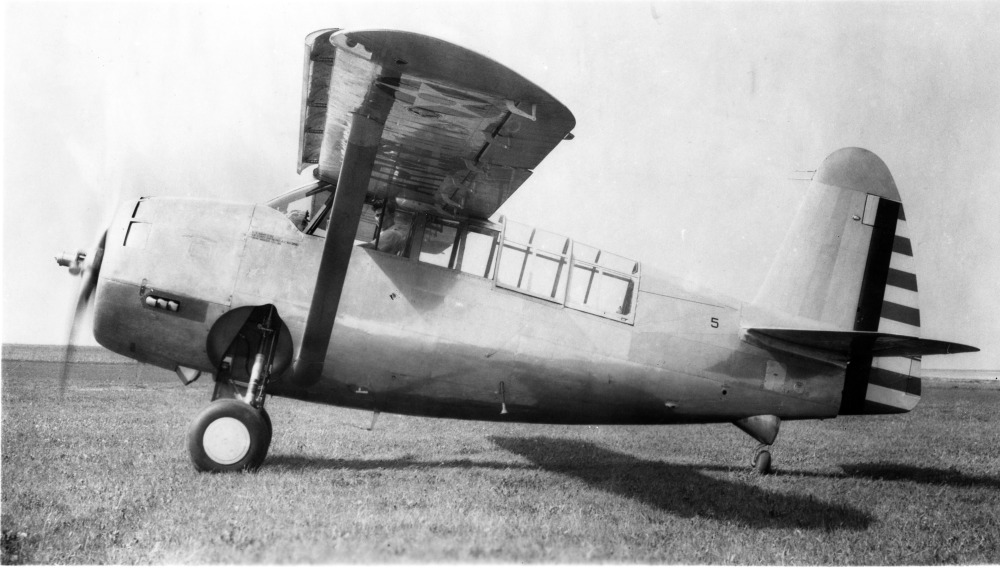
Curtiss O-52 Owl

The 5th Observation Squadron was activated on 7 February 1942, at Post Field, Oklahoma as the 5th Observation Squadron (Special). The squadron replaced Flight E of the 16th Observation Squadron, which had supported the Field Artillery School since 1931. It was initially equipped with the Curtiss O-52 Owl observation aircraft, but also flew the Douglas B-18 Bolo bomber, and a number of light aircraft, sometimes called "Flivvers", "Puddle Jumpers" or "Grasshoppers."

The 5th was assigned directly to the Office of the Chief of Air Corps and attached to the Field Artillery School, providing aircraft for training with the school. However, in June 1942, the War Department decided that field artillery units would have organic aircraft assigned to serve as air observation posts. The planes would be flown and maintained by field artillery personnel, not members of the Air Corps, and the school to train them would be located at Post Field. As a result, the squadron was relieved of its attachment to the artillery school in August and moved to Marshall Field, Kansas to make way for the first class, which began arriving in September.

The squadron moved to Desert Center Army Air Field, where it supported units training at the Desert Training Center, later relocating to Thermal Army Air Field in September. It converted entirely to liaison aircraft in April 1943, becoming the 5th Liaison Squadron. Except for squadron staff officers and flight leaders, pilots of these light planes were enlisted men, typically holding the rank of Staff Sergeant. In October, the squadron moved to Alamo Army Air Field, Texas and prepared for movement overseas.

==== Combat in India and Burma ====
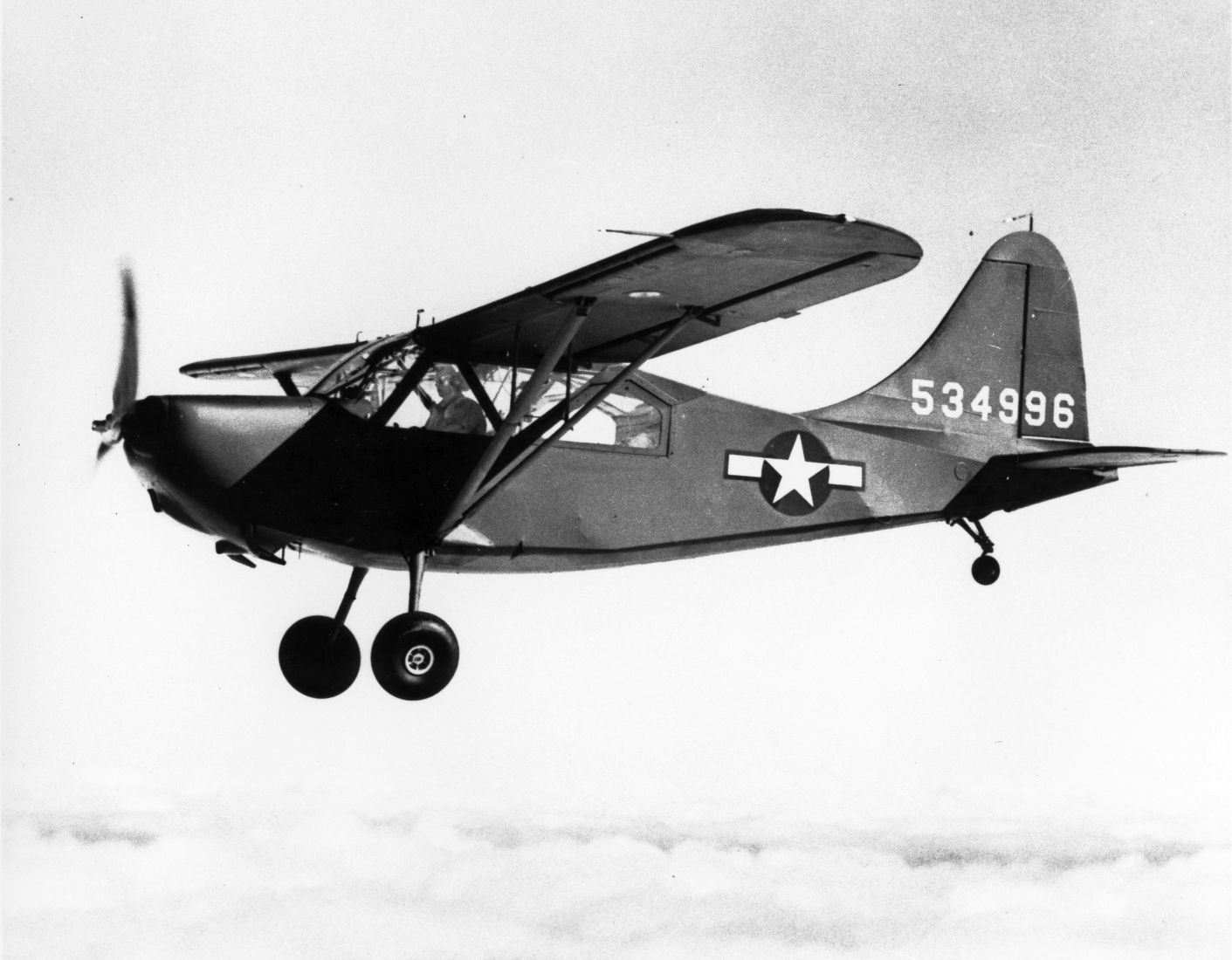
L-5 Sentinel, as flown by the squadron

In February 1944, the squadron departed the United States for the China-Burma-India Theater, arriving at Ledo Airfield, India in April. From August 1944 until May 1945, Tenth Air Force created the 1st Liaison Group, a provisional unit that included the 5th, along with the 19th, 71st and 115th Liaison Squadrons for operations. While in the CBI Theater, it flew 33,904 sorties. In the course of 14 months of operations, 40 squadron aircraft were destroyed in accidents or by enemy action, on one occasion it lost three Stinson L-1 Vigilants in an attempt to rescue a downed bomber crew member from an improvised airstrip in a jungle clearing. Two squadron pilots were killed in the line of duty and two others were MIA and later declared dead. It evacuated over 4,000 casualties (Note: Gray states that squadron records show the number was over 4,500.) from makeshift jungle airstrips and carried hundreds of tons of equipment and supplies and thousands of passengers.

In addition, the squadron's pilots occasionally acted as forward air controllers, directing attacks against Japanese gun positions and troops. The squadron remained in theater until late 1945, then returned to the United States and was inactivated at the Port of Embarkation, Camp Kilmer, New Jersey, in January 1946.

=== Post war operations ===
A little over a year later, the squadron was activated at Greenville Army Air Base, South Carolina. It was inactivated there in April 1949.

A few months later, the squadron was redesignated the 5th Helicopter Squadron. It was activated at Pope Air Force Base, North Carolina in October 1949 and equipped with Sikorsky H-5 helicopters. It was inactivated in July 1952.

The squadron returned to its designation as a liaison unit and was activated at Sewart Air Force Base, Tennessee in September 1952. At Sewart, it trained for Arctic operations with de Havilland Canada L-20 Beavers. It moved to Elmendorf Air Force Base, Alaska in April 1953 and operated the Beaver from several locations in Alaska until inactivating in July 1954.

== Lineage ==
- Constituted as the 5th Observation Squadron (Special) on 28 January 1942

Activated on 7 February 1942
Redesignated 5th Observation Squadron on 8 August 1942
Redesignated 5th Liaison Squadron on 2 April 1943
Inactivated on 11 January 1946

- Activated on 15 October 1947

Inactivated on 1 April 1949

- Redesignated 5th Helicopter Squadron on 27 September 1949

Activated on 27 October 1949
Inactivated on 22 July 1952

- Redesignated 5th Liaison Squadron on 14 August 1952

Activated on 8 September 1952
Inactivated on 18 June 1954

=== Assignments ===
- Office of Chief of Air Corps, 7 February 1942 (attached to Field Artillery School)
- Army Air Forces, 9 March 1942 (attached to Field Artillery School)
- 74th Observation Group, 8 August 1942
- 77th Observation Group, 25 January 1943
- 74th Reconnaissance Group, 2 April 1943
- IV Air Support Command (later III Tactical Air Division), 11 August 1943 (attached to 74th Tactical Reconnaissance Group, 17 August – c. 15 September 1943)
- II Tactical Air Division, 12 October 1943
- Army Air Forces, India-Burma Sector, 28 March 1944 (attached to Northern Combat Area Command, 20 May – August 1944);
- Tenth Air Force, 21 August 1944 (attached to 1st Liaison Group [Provisional], 29 August 1944, North Burma Air Task Force after 1 May 1945)
- Army Air Forces, India-Burma Sector, 31 July 1945 – 11 January 1946 (attached to North Burma Air Task Force until c. 5 September 1945)
- Ninth Air Force, 15 October 1947 (attached to 316th Troop Carrier Wing)
- Fourteenth Air Force, 1 February – 1 April 1949 (attached to 316th Troop Carrier Wing)
- Fourteenth Air Force 27 October 1949
- Tactical Air Command, 1 August 1950
- Ninth Air Force 5 October 1950 – 22 July 1952 (attached to 4415th Air Base Group after 4 April 1951)
- Eighteenth Air Force, 8 September 1952 (attached to 314th Troop Carrier Wing)
- Alaskan Air Command, 1 April 1953 (attached to 39th Air Depot Wing until 13 April 1953, then to 5039th Air Transport Group)
- 5039th Air Base Wing, 1 July 1953 – 18 June 1954

=== Stations ===
- Post Field, Oklahoma, 7 February 1942
- Marshall Field, Kansas, 4 August 1942
- Cox Army Air Field, Texas, 18 May 1943
- Desert Center Army Air Field, 18 March 1943
- Thermal Army Air Field, 15 September 1943
- Alamo Army Air Field, Texas, 12 October 1943 – 27 February 1944
- Ledo Airfield, India, 20 April 1944
- Shaduzup, Burma, 30 April 1944
- Myitkyina, Burma, 3 October 1944
- Bhamo Airfield, Burma 22 January 1945
- Kharagpur Airfield, India, c. 3 October – November 1945
- Camp Kilmer, New Jersey, 10–11 January 1946
- Greenville Army Air Base (later Greenville Air Force Base), (Note: This base was later renamed Donaldson Air Force Base, and should not be confused with Greenville Air Force Base (Mississippi).) South Carolina, 15 April 1947 – 1 April 1949
- Pope Air Force Base, North Carolina, 27 October 1949 – 22 July 1952
- Sewart Air Force Base, Tennessee, 8 September 1952
- Elmendorf Air Force Base, Alaska, 1 April 1953 – 18 June 1954(detachments at Ladd Air Force Base, Alaska and Bethel Air Force Station, Alaska

=== Aircraft ===
- Douglas B-18 Bolo, 1942–1943
- Curtiss O-52 Owl], 1942–1943
- Aeronca L-3 Grasshopper, 1942–1943
- Stinson L-1 Vigilant, 1942–1943, 1944–1945
- Piper L-4 Grasshopper, 1942–1943, 1945, 1948–1949
- Interstate L-6 Cadet, 1942–1943
- Stinson L-5 Sentinel, 1943–1945, 1948–1949
- Stinson L-13, 1947–1948
- Sikorsky H-5, 1949–1951
- de Havilland Canada L-20 Beaver, 1952–1954

=== Campaigns ===
| Campaign Streamer | Campaign | Dates | Notes |
|---|---|---|---|
| | India-Burma | 20 April 1944 – 28 January 1945 | 5th Liaison Squadron |
| | China Defensive | 20 April 1944 – 4 May 1945 | 5th Liaison Squadron |
| | Central Burma | 29 January 1945 – 15 July 1945 | 5th Liaison Squadron |

== See also ==
- Air observation post
