= 158th Liaison Squadron =

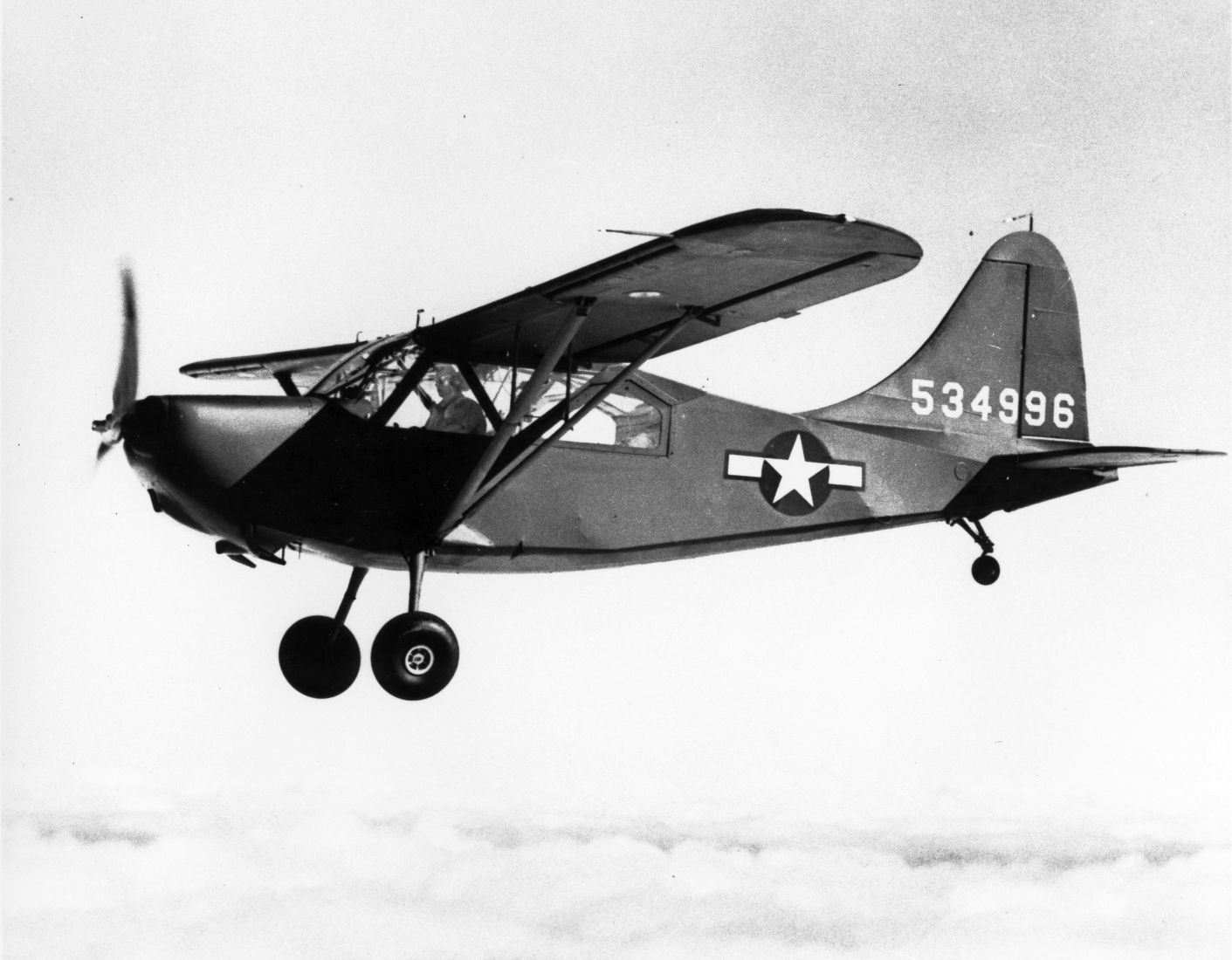
- L-5 Sentinel, primary airplane flown by the squadron
- Active: 1944–1946; 1946–1949
- Country: United States
- Branch: United States Air Force
- Role: aerial reconnaissance and support
- Engagements: European Theater of Operations

Insignia
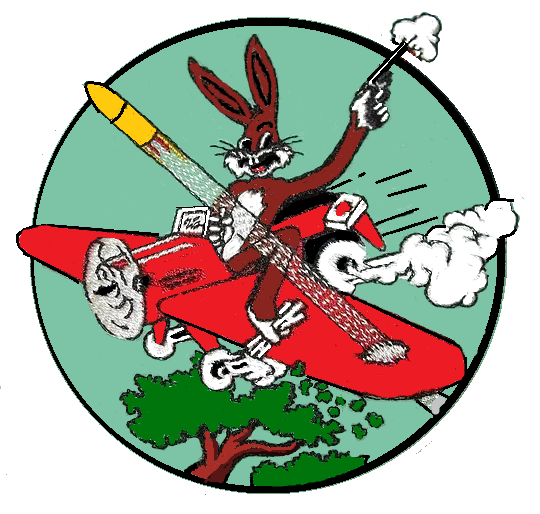
- 158 Liaison Sq emblem (Note: Approved 16 December 1944.)

The 158th Liaison Squadron is an inactive United States Air Force unit. It served in the European Theater of Operations in the final months of World War II before returning to the United States in 1946, when it was inactivated. Later that year, it was again activated and served in the occupation forces in Japan until inactivating in 1949 in response to the Truman administration budget cuts of that year.

== History ==
=== World War II ===
The 158th Liaison Squadron was activated in March 1944 at Raleigh-Durham Army Air Field, North Carolina and primarily equipped with Stinson L-5 Sentinels, although it flew a number of other aircraft. Its initial mission was to conduct tactical training and indoctrination for field operations of liaison units and to act as a Replacement Training Unit. However, by the time the squadron was organized, the Army Air Forces (AAF) had already determined that standard military units like the 158th, which were based on relatively inflexible tables of organization, were not well adapted to the training mission. Therefore, in July the squadron began training for deployment overseas. It departed North Carolina in November 1944 for the port of embarkation at Camp Myles Standish, sailing on 2 December and arrived at Nantwich, England in the European Theater of Operations on 13 December.

The squadron once again equipped with the Sentinel, plus a few other types of liaison aircraft, and moved to the continent of Europe in February 1945. It began combat operations from Belgium and Germany the following month, continuing them until V-E Day. Its missions included reconnaissance and light photographic observation, troop and light cargo transport, aeromedical evacuation and command liaison and courier flights. After the German surrender, it moved to France, where it provided support services until February 1946, when it moved to Bolling Field without personnel or equipment. It remained unmanned until it was inactivated at the end of March, shortly after the AAF reorganized into Strategic, Tactical Air Command, and Air Defense Commands.

=== Occupation of Japan ===
The squadron was activated again on 25 October 1946 at Nagoya Airfield, Japan, where it formed part of the occupation forces. Once again it equipped with the Stinson L-5. Due to personnel shortages, around 1 April 1947, the squadron was reduced to zero manning, although still kept on the rolls. By September, the squadron again received personnel and aircraft. The squadron conducted passenger and light freight transport missions, and carried classified documents between Fifth Air Force bases. It also conducted occasional search and rescue missions. During June and July 1948, the squadron assisted in recovery operations following the Fukui earthquake. It also dropped leaflets to encourage citizens to pay taxes, and engaged in radio reconnaissance missions.

However, President Truman's reduced 1949 defense budget required reductions in the number of units in the Air Force, and the 158th was inactivated on 1 April 1949.

== Lineage ==
- Constituted as the 158th Liaison Squadron on 23 February 1944

Activated on 1 March 1944
Inactivated on 31 March 1946

- Activated on 25 October 1946

Inactivated on 1 April 1949

=== Assignments ===
- I Tactical Air Division (later III Tactical Air Division), 1 March 1944
- III Tactical Air Command, 1 October 1944
- Ninth Air Force, 13 December 1944 (attached to Twelfth Army Group, 18 January – 25 July 1945)
- European Air Transport Service, 25 September 1945
- Continental Air Forces (later Strategic Air Command), 15 February – 31 March 1946
- Fifth Air Force, 25 October 1946 – 1 February 1949

=== Stations ===
- Raleigh-Durham Army Air Field, North Carolina, 1 March – 16 November 1944
- Nantwich, Cheshire, England, 13 December 1944 – 21 January 1945
- Somme-Suippe, Lorraine, France, 4 February 1945
- Celles, Houyet, Belgium, 16 February 1945
- Ahrweiler, Germany, 17 April 1945
- Orly Airport (A-47), France, 22 July 1945
- Villacoublay Airfield (Sta 180, A-42), France
- Bolling Field District of Columbia, 15 February – 31 March 1946
- Nagoya Airfield, Japan, 25 October 1946 – 1 February 1949

=== Aircraft ===
- Stinson L-5 Sentinel, 1944, 1945–1946, 1946–1947, 1947-1949
- Douglas A-24 Banshee, 1944
- Douglas RA-24 Banshee, 1944
- Cessna UC-78 Bobcat, 1944
- Vultee BT-13 Valiant, 1944
- Stinson L-1 Vigilant, 1945-1946
- Piper L-4 Grasshopper, 1945-1946

=== Campaigns ===
Campaign Streamer	Campaign	Dates	Notes
	Rhineland	4 February 1945 – 21 March 1945	
	Central Europe	22 March 1944 – 21 May 1945	
	World War II Army of Occupation (Japan)	25 October 1946 – 1 February 1949	
