= 13th Air Support Operations Squadron =

13th Air Support Operations Squadron

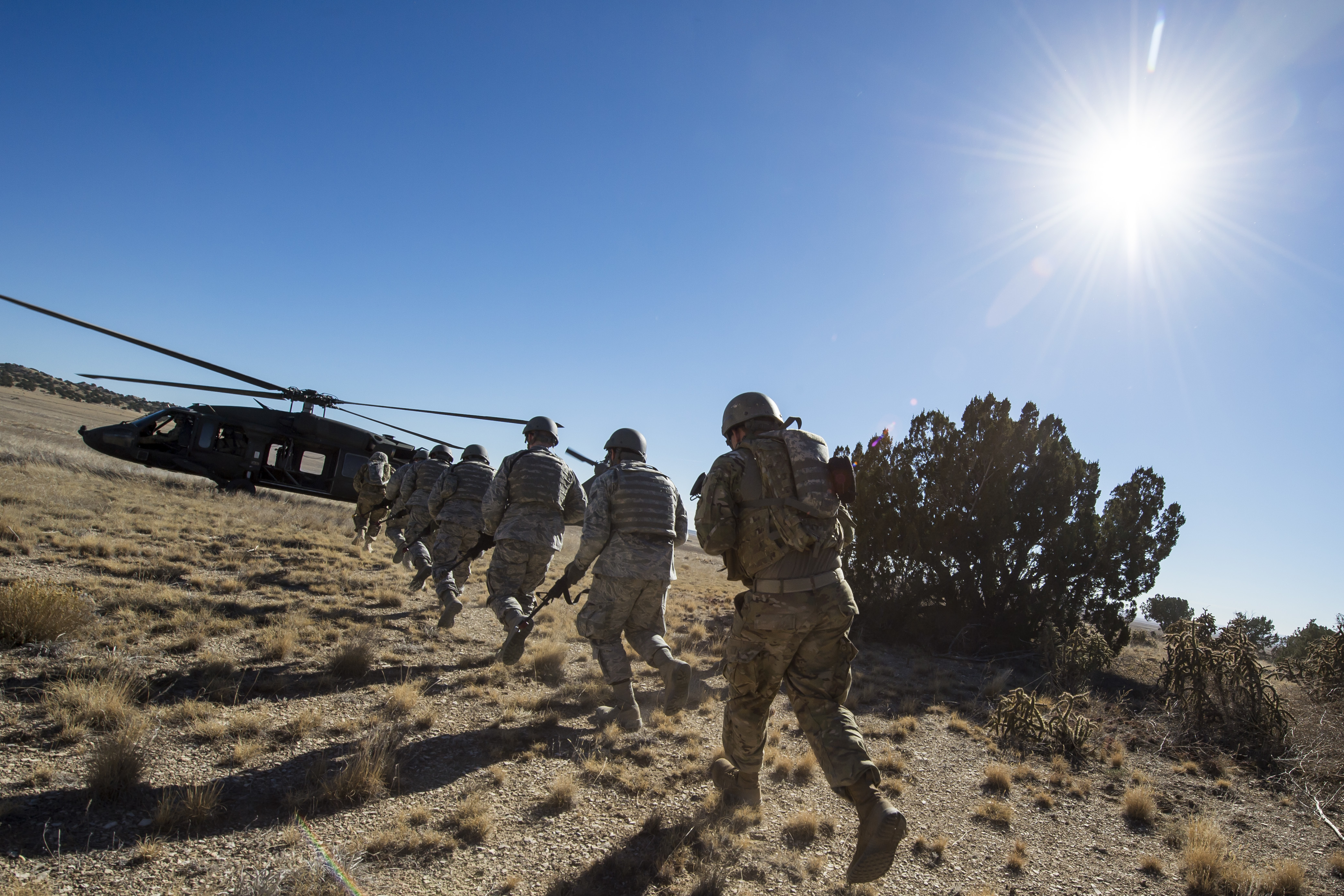
- Squadron airmen approach a helicopter for extraction following a joint exercise with the 4th Infantry Division
- Active: 1943–1944; 1994-present
- Country: United States
- Branch: United States Air Force
- Role: Air Support Operations (to 4th Infantry Division
- Part of: Air Combat Command
- Garrison/HQ: Fort Carson, Colorado
- Motto(s): On Time On Target
- Engagements: Iraq War
- Decorations: Air Force Meritorious Unit Award; Air Force Outstanding Unit Award

Insignia
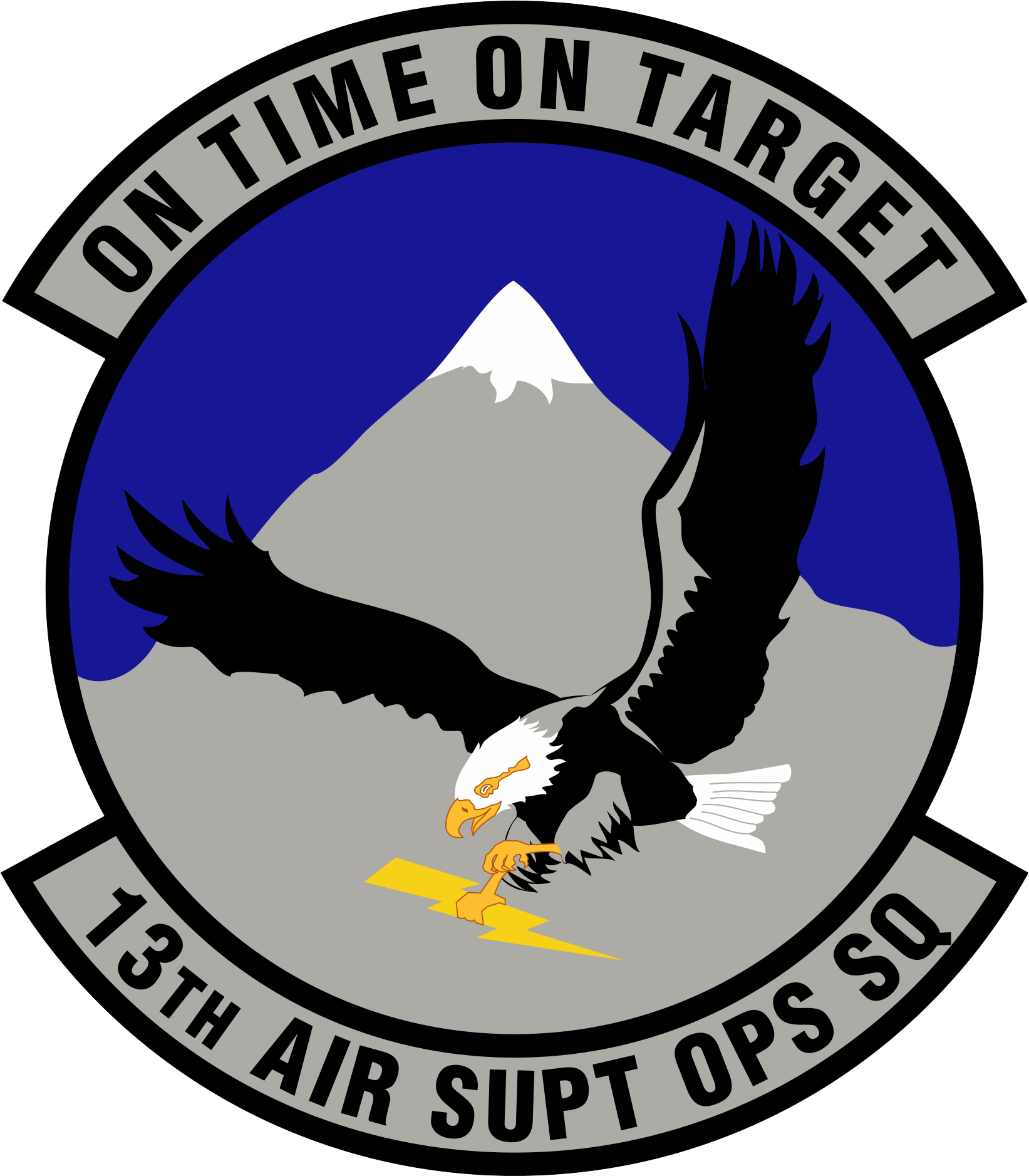
- 13th Air Support Operations Squadron emblem (approved 29 May 1996)

The United States Air Force's 13th Air Support Operations Squadron is a combat support unit located at Fort Carson, Colorado. The squadron provides tactical command and control of close air support assets to US Army ground commanders of the 4th Infantry Division during combat operations.

== Mission ==
The squadron's mission is to provide mission ready airmen to advise, integrate & control air and space power in support of the 4th Infantry Division; to train, deploy, & focus combat airpower and integrated weather operations for the joint force commander alongside III Corps or a supported land force commander.

== History ==
=== World War II ===
The squadron was first activated in January 1943 at Birmingham Army Air Base, Alabama, where it trained with III Air Support Command for the next six months. In June, it moved to Thermal Army Air Field, California, where it was assigned to IV Air Support Command. In California, it helped train ground units and participated in exercises and maneuvers with the Desert Training Center. By 1944, the need for ground forces to train for desert warfare had been reduced. Also, the Army Air Forces found that standard military units, based on relatively inflexible tables of organization were proving not well adapted to the training mission and decided to replace them with a more functional system in which each base was organized into a separate numbered unit. As a result, the squadron, now the 13th Tactical Air Communications Squadron, was disbanded in April 1944.

=== Current operations ===
The squadron was redesignated the 13th Air Support Operations Squadron and activated on 1 July 1994 at Fort Carson, Colorado.

== Lineage ==
- Constituted as the 13th Air Support Control Squadron on 11 January 1943 (Note: Dollman says "Air Support Operations Squadron", but this designation was not used during World War II.)

Activated on 15 January 1943
Redesignated 13th Tactical Air Communications Squadron on 29 February 1944
Disbanded on 15 April 1944

- Reconstituted and redesignated 13th Air Support Operations Squadron on 24 June 1994

Activated on 1 July 1994

=== Assignments ===
- III Air Support Command, 15 January 1943
- IV Air Support Command (later III Tactical Air Division, I Tactical Air Division), 7 June 1943 – 15 April 1944
- 3d Air Support Operations Group, 1 July 1994 – present

=== Stations ===
- Birmingham Army Air Base, Alabama, 15 January 1943
- Thermal Army Air Field, California, 7 June 1943
- Camp Young, California, 15 September 1943
- Thermal Army Air Field, California, 14 March 1944 – 15 April 1944
- Fort Carson, Colorado, 1 July 1994 – present

=== Decorations ===
- Air Force Meritorious Unit Award
  - 1 June 2002 – 31 May 2004
- Air Force Outstanding Unit Award
  - 1 July 1994 – 31 May 1996
  - 1 June 1998 – 31 May 2000
  - 1 June 2000 – 31 May 2002
