= 31st Photographic Reconnaissance Squadron =

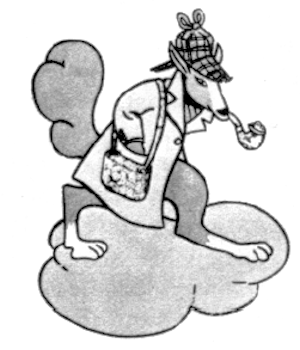
- Emblem of the 31st Photographic Reconnaissance Squadron
- Active: 1943-1949
- Country: United States
- Branch: United States Air Force
- Role: Reconnaissance

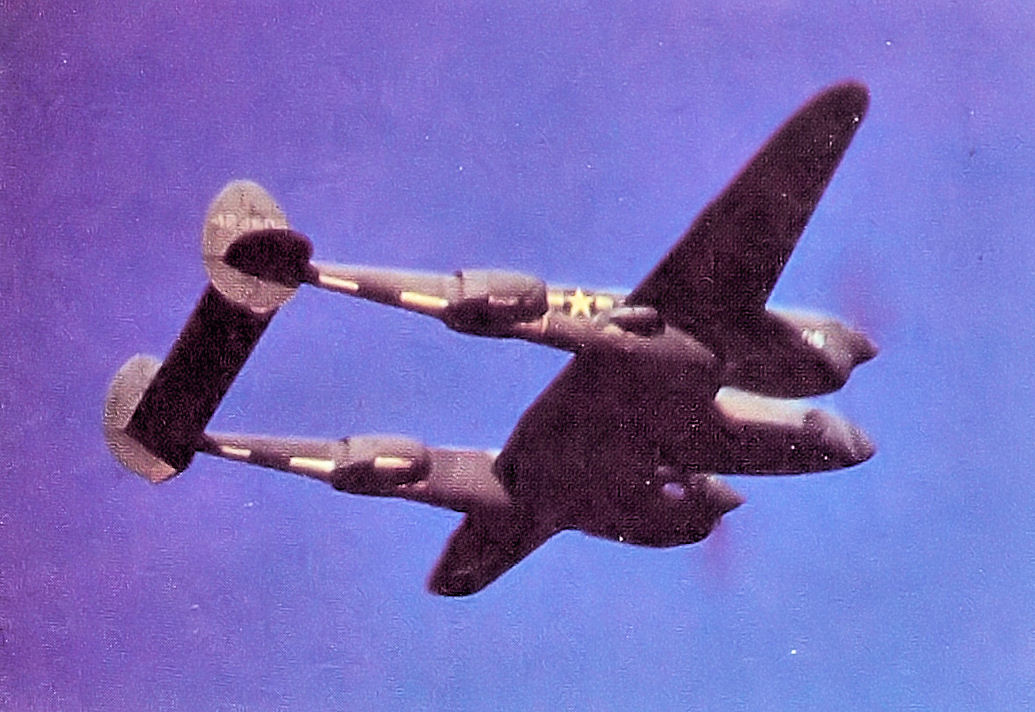
31st Photographic Reconnaissance Squadron Lockheed P-38J-20-LO Lightning (F-5E) 44-23450 Sexy Sail over Saint-Dizier Airfield (A-64), France, October 1944.

The 31st Photographic Reconnaissance Squadron is an inactive United States Air Force unit. It was last assigned to the 74th Reconnaissance Group, stationed at Mitchel Field, New York. It was inactivated on 27 June 1949.

== History ==
Established in mid-1943 as a photo-reconnaissance squadron, trained in the southeast United States. Deployed to the European Theater of Operations (ETO) in the spring of 1944, initially engaged in aerial photography of the French English Channel coastline and Low Countries. After D-Day, moved to France and performed battlefield tactical reconnaissance primarily for Third Army, also for First and Ninth Armies during the Northern France Campaign in 1944. Moved into Germany as part of the Allied invasion of Western Germany, spring 1945 continuing to supply battlefield reconnaissance for Army ground forces.

After the German Capitulation, remained as part of the Occupation Army of the United States Air Forces in Europe, gradually de-mobilizing during the fall of 1945 until inactivated.

Was re-activated as an Air Force Reserve squadron 1947–1949; unit not manned or equipped. Inactivated in 1949 due to budget reductions.

=== Lineage ===
- Constituted 70th Reconnaissance Squadron (Fighter) on 15 Jun 1943

Activated on 20 Jun 1943.
Re-designated 31st Photographic Reconnaissance Squadron on 11 Aug 1943
Inactivated on 22 Nov 1945

- Re-designated 31st Reconnaissance Squadron (Night Photographic) on 5 Sep 1947

Activated in the reserve on 13 Nov 1947
Re-designated 33d Reconnaissance Squadron (Night Photographic) on 25 Nov 1947.
Inactivated on 27 Jun 1949

=== Assignments ===
- 76th Reconnaissance Group, 20 Jun 1943
- III Reconnaissance Command, 11 Aug 1943
- 10th Photographic (later Reconnaissance) Group, 31 Mar 1944 – 22 Nov 1945
- 74th Reconnaissance Group, 13 Nov 1947 – 27 Jun 1949.

=== Stations ===
- Morris Field, North Carolina, 20 Jun 1943
- Will Rogers Field, Oklahoma, 29 Oct 1943 – 11 Feb 1944
- RAF Chalgrove (AAF-465), England, 23 Mar 1944
- Rennes-St-Jacques Airfield (A-27), France, 18 Aug 1944
- Châteaudun Airfield (A-39), France, 27 Aug 1944
- Saint-Dizier Airfield (A-64), France, 12 Sep 1944
- Conflans-en-Jarnisy Airfield (A-94), France, 29 Nov 1944
- Trier/Evren Airfield (Y-57), 28 Mar 1945
- Ober Olm Airfield (Y-64), Germany, 5 Apr 1945
- Fürth Airfield (later AAF Station Fürth), Germany, 30 Apr – 22 Nov 1945
- Mitchel Field, New York, 13 Nov 1947 – 27 Jun 1949

=== Aircraft ===
- F-5 Lightning, 1943-1945
- F-4 Lightning, 1943-1944
- F-6 Mustang, 1945.
