= 33d Reconnaissance Squadron =

33d Reconnaissance Squadron may refer to:

- The 422d Bombardment Squadron, designated the 33d Reconnaissance Squadron (Heavy) from March 1942 to April 1942.
- The 33d Network Warfare Squadron, designated the 33d Reconnaissance Squadron (Night Photographic) from November 1947 to June 1949.
- The 33d Reconnaissance Squadron (Fighter), active with this designation from April 1943 to August 1943.
