= 18th Air Support Operations Group =

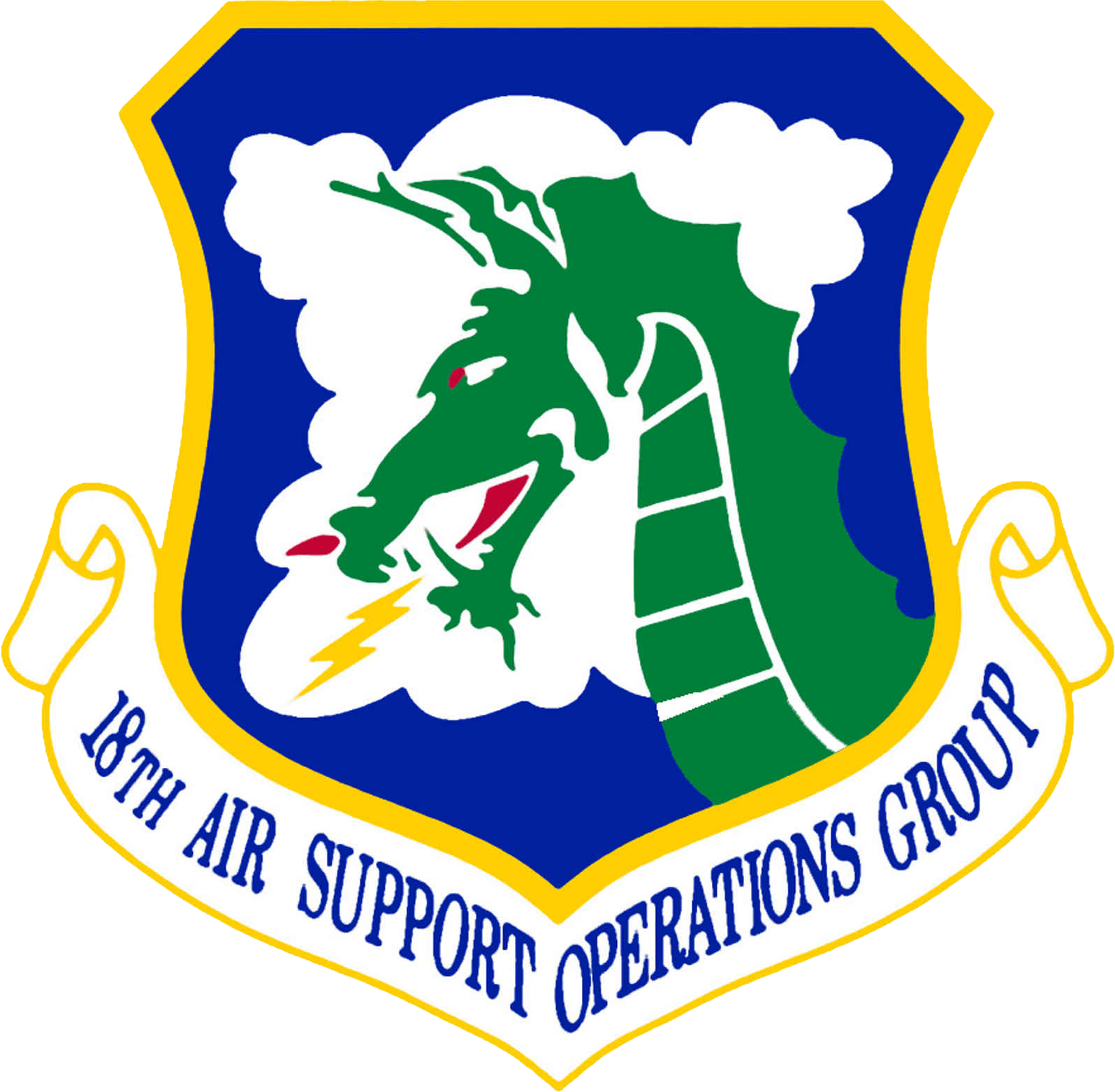
- 18th Air Support Operations Group emblem
- Active: 1943–1944; 1945-1946; 1992–present
- Country: United States
- Branch: United States Air Force
- Role: Air Operations Group
- Part of: Ninth Air Force
- Garrison/HQ: Pope Field, North Carolina
- Engagements: Mediterranean Theater of Operations; European Theater of Operations
- Decorations: Air Force Outstanding Unit Award

The 18th Air Support Operations Group is a combat support group of the United States Air Force. It is located at Pope Field, North Carolina. The group was originally the 18th Air Support Communications Squadron and served in the Mediterranean and European Theaters of Operations during World War II as an air communications squadron.

The 18th ASOG provides tactical command and control of air power assets for the U.S. Army's XVIII Airborne Corps. In this role its subordinate squadrons provide tactical combat command and control to the Joint Forces Air Component Commander and Joint Forces Land Component Commander.

== History ==
The organization was originally activated in April 1943 as the 18th Air Support Communication Squadron. The squadron trained in the southeastern United States under Third Air Force until February 1944, when it deployed to the Mediterranean Theater of Operations and was assigned to XII Air Support Command. The unit was redesignated the 18th Tactical Air Communications Squadron and moved to Italy in April. It was disbanded in Italy in June 1944.

The squadron was reconstituted and activated in Germany on 15 April 1945, where it became part of Ninth Air Force. It returned to the United States in July and was inactivated in the summer of 1946. The squadron was disbanded while inactive in October 1948.

In June 1992, the unit was reconstituted and redesignated as the 18th Air Support Group. It assumed much of the responsibilities of the inactivating 507th Air Control Wing. It was redesignated 18th Air Support Operations Group on 1 July 1994.

== Organization ==
In addition to group headquarters, the 18th ASOG includes a number of subordinate squadrons. These units are located at Pope Field except as indicated and include the following.

14th Air Support Operations Squadron (supports 82nd Airborne Division)
15th Air Support Operations Squadron

Fort Stewart, Georgia (supports 1st, 2nd & 4th Brigade Combat Teams, 3rd Infantry Division)
Fort Benning, Georgia (supports 3rd Brigade Combat Team, 3rd Infantry Division)

18th Combat Weather Squadron

Simmons Army Airfield, Fort Bragg, North Carolina (supports 82nd Airborne Division and XVIII Airborne Corps)

Detachment 1, Fort Drum, New York (supports 10th Mountain Division)
Detachment 2, Fort Polk, Louisiana (supports 10th Mountain Division)
Detachment 3, Fort Stewart, Georgia (supports 3rd Infantry Division)

Detachment 3 - Operating Location A, Hunter Army Airfield, Georgia (supports 3rd Infantry Division)

Detachment 4, Fort Campbell, Kentucky (supports 101st Airborne Division)
Operating Location A, Shaw AFB, South Carolina (supports US Army Central Command)
Operating Location B, Fort Belvoir, Virginia (supports The Army Aviation Brigade)
Operating Location C, Fort Rucker, Alabama (supports United States Army Aviation Center of Excellence)
Operating Location D, Fort Benning, Georgia (supports United States Army Maneuver Center of Excellence)

19th Air Support Operations Squadron

Fort Campbell, Kentucky (supports 101st Airborne Division) (Air Assault)

20th Air Support Operations Squadron

Fort Drum, New York (supports 1st, 2nd & 3rd Brigade Combat Teams, 10th Mountain Division)
Detachment. 1 Fort Polk, Louisiana (supports 4th Brigade Combat Team, 10th Mountain Division)

818th Operations Support Squadron

== Lineage ==
- Constituted as the 18th Air Support Communication Squadron on 24 March 1943

Activated on 1 April 1943

- Redesignated 18th Tactical Air Communications Squadron on 1 April 1944
- Disbanded on 10 June 1944
- Reconstituted on 19 March 1945

Activated on 15 April 1945
Inactivated on 12 August 1946

- Disbanded on 8 October 1948
- Reconstituted, redesignated 18th Air Support Group, and activated on 15 June 1992
- Redesignated 18th Air Support Operations Group on 1 July 1994

=== Assignments ===
- III Air Support Command (later III Reconnaissance Command): 1 April 1943
- I Tactical Air Division: 3 November 1943
- XII Air Support Command (later XII Tactical Air Command): c. 12 February 1944 – 10 June 1944
- Ninth Air Force: 15 April 1945
- XXIX Tactical Air Command (Provisional): 3 Jul 1945
- Fourth Air Force: c. 24 August 1945
- Third Air Force: 8 March 1946
- Ninth Air Force: 28 March 1946 – 12 August 1946
- 23d Wing: 15 June 1992
- Ninth Air Force: 1 February 1994 – present

=== Stations ===
- Birmingham Army Air Field, Alabama, 1 April 1943
- Lebanon, Tennessee, 4 September 1943
- Morris Field, North Carolina, 26 November 1943 – 15 January 1944
- Oran, Algeria, 12 February 1944
- Ain-el-Turck, Algeria, 10 March 1944
- Oran, Algeria, 1 April 1944
- Naples, Italy, 9 April 1944
- Caserta, Italy, 11 April 1944 – 10 Jun 1944
- Haltern, Germany, 1 April 1945
- Brunswick, Germany, May 1945 - July 1945
- Lemoore Army Air Field, California, 24 August 1945
- Camp Pinedale, California, 8 September 1945
- Biggs Field, Texas, 9 March 1946 – 12 August 1946
- Pope Air Force Base (later Pope Field), North Carolina, 15 Jun 1992–present
