= 76th Tactical Reconnaissance Group =

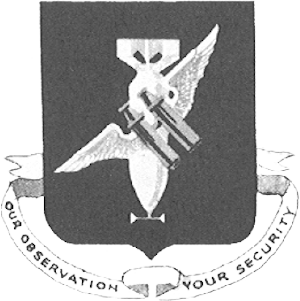
- Emblem of the 76th Tactical Reconnaissance Group
- Active: 1942–1944
- Country: United States
- Branch: United States Army Air Forces
- Role: Reconnaissance
- Part of: Third Air Force
- Motto(s): Our Observation, Your Security
- Engagements: American Theater of World War II

The 76th Tactical Reconnaissance Group is a disbanded United States Army Air Forces organization. It was last active in 1944 as part of the Desert Training Center at Thermal Army Air Field, California.

== History ==
The group was constituted and activated in early 1942 at MacDill Field, Florida as the 76th Observation Group shortly after the United States entered World War II. Its original squadron was the 24th Observation Squadron, which was joined a few days later by the 23d Observation Squadron when the group moved to Key Field, Mississippi.

The group trained in aerial reconnaissance and air support techniques until March 1943 under Third Air Force. It participated in maneuvers with Second Army until September 1943 when it moved to Thermal AAF and began participating in desert training in California and Arizona. In anticipation of this move, its existing squadrons were reassigned and replaced by new units. It was disbanded on 15 April 1944.

== Lineage ==
- Constituted on 5 February 1942 as the 76th Observation Group

Activated on 27 February 1942
Redesignated as the 76th Reconnaissance Group on 2 April 1943
Redesignated as the 76th Tactical Reconnaissance Group on 11 August 1943

- Disbanded on 15 April 1944

=== Subordinate Units ===
- 20th Observation Squadron (later 20th Reconnaissance Squadron, 20th Tactical Reconnaissance Squadron): 12 March 1942 – 23 August 1943
- 23d Observation Squadron (later 23d Reconnaissance Squadron): 2 March 1942 – 20 June 1943
- 24th Observation Squadron (later 24th Reconnaissance Squadron): 27 February 1942 – 11 August 1943
- 70th Reconnaissance Squadron: 20 June 1943 – 11 August 1943
- 91st Tactical Reconnaissance Squadron: 11 August 1943 – 23 August 1943
- 97th Tactical Reconnaissance Squadron: 23 August 1943 – 15 Apr 1944
- 101st Photographic Mapping Squadron: 21 October 1943 – 29 Mar 1944
- 102d Tactical Reconnaissance Squadron: 5 April 1944 – 15 April 1944
- 106th Reconnaissance Squadron: 20 June 1943 – 13 July 1943
- 121st Liaison Squadron: 30 April 1943 – 11 August 1943

=== Assignments ===
- Third Air Force, 27 February 1942
- 3d Ground Air Support Command (later III Air Support Command, III Reconnaissance Command), 27 February 1942
- Desert Training Center, ca. 20 September 1943
- III Tactical Air Division, ca. 15 December 1943 – 15 April 1944

=== Stations Assigned ===
- MacDill Field, Florida, 27 February 1942
- Key Field, Mississippi, c. 3 March 1942
- Pope Field, North Carolina, 28 March 1942
- Vichy Army Air Field, Missouri, 10 December 1942
- Morris Field, North Carolina, 10 May 1943
- Thermal Army Air Field, California ca. 20 September 1943 – 15 April 1944

=== Aircraft Flown ===
- Douglas A-20 Havoc
- North American B-25 Mitchell
- Stinson L-1 Vigilant
- Piper L-4 Cub
- Stinson L-5 Sentinel
- Interstate L-6 Grasshopper
- Bell P-39 Airacobra
- Curtiss P-40 Warhawk

=== Awards ===
- American Theater of World War II
