= 12th Aeromedical Airlift Squadron =

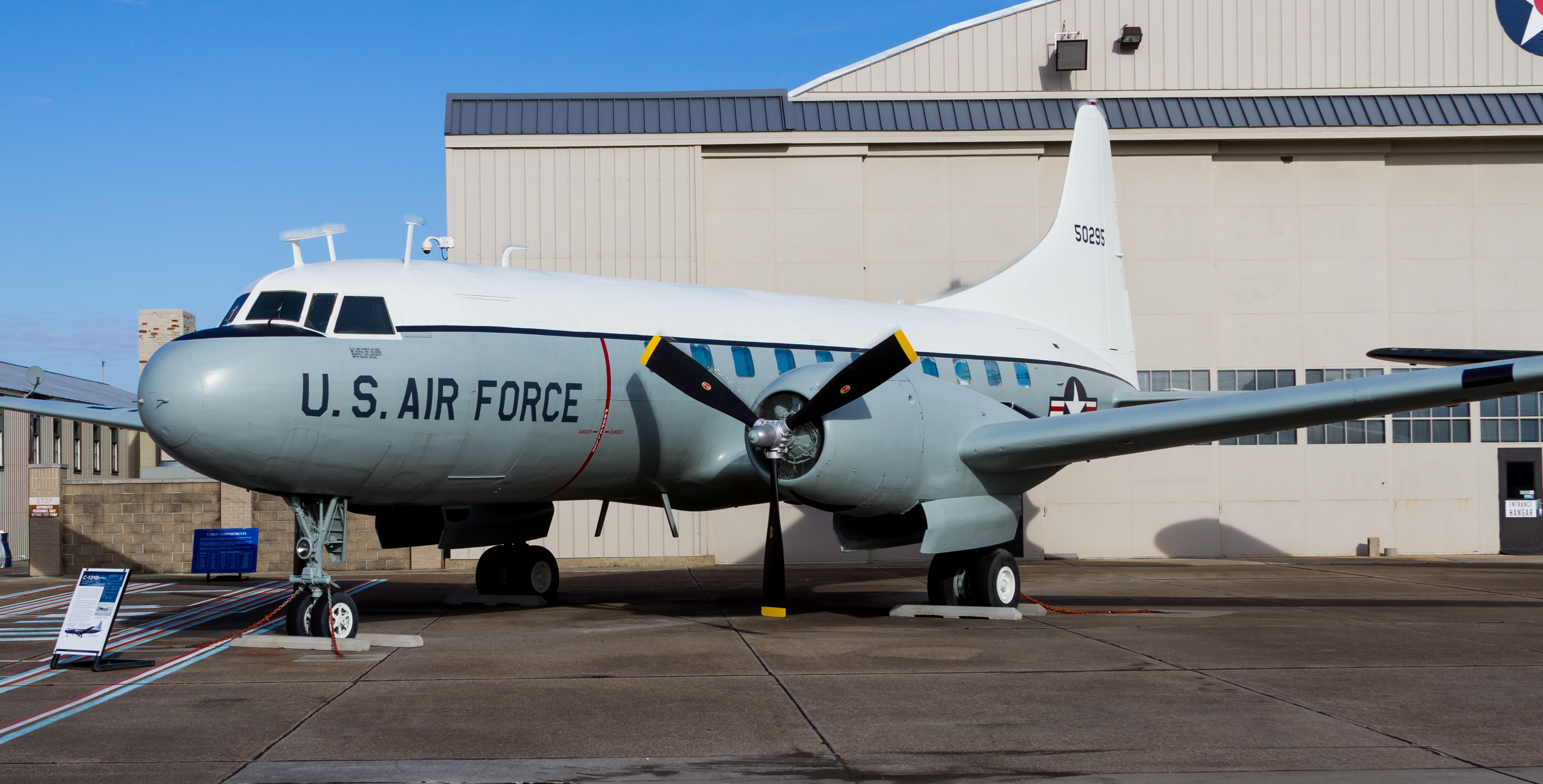
- C-131 Samaritan at the Air Mobility Command Museum
- Active: 1942–1944; 1944–1946; 1956–1969
- Country: United States
- Branch: United States Air Force
- Role: Ferrying, testing, aeromedical evacuation
- Decorations: Air Force Outstanding Unit Award

Insignia
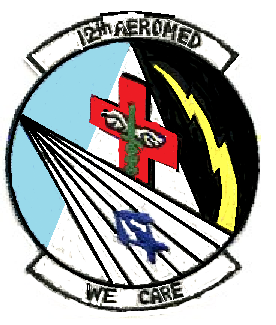
- 12th Aeromedical Airlift Squadron emblem

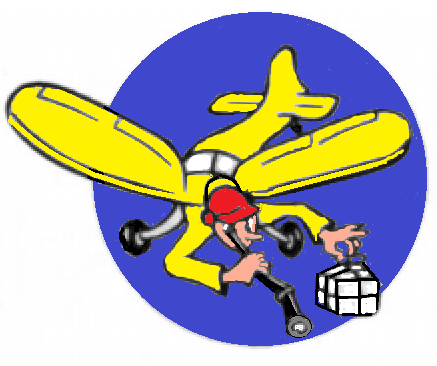
- 162 Liaison Sq emblem (Note: Approved 21 March 1945.)

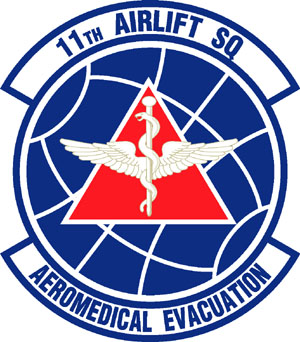
- 11th Airlift Squadron emblem (Note: The 11th, 12th, and 13th Aeromedical Transport Squadrons all used patches with this emblem with the squadron designation on a scroll. See examples at Eric's USAF Patches)

The 12th Aeromedical Airlift Squadron is an inactive United States Air Force unit. From 1956 through 1969, it flew aeromedical evacuation missions from McGuire Air Force Base. In 1985, the squadron was consolidated with two World War II units, but remained inactive. The consolidated squadrons were the 12th Ferrying Squadron, which ferried aircraft to Europe and from factories to flying units from 1942 and 1944; and the 162d Liaison Squadron, which tested equipment and developed tactics for liaison units between 1944 and 1946.

== History ==
=== Ferrying ===
The first predecessor of the squadron, the 12th Air Corps Ferrying Squadron, was activated on 8 April 1942 at Logan Field, Massachusetts, but moved the following month to New Castle Army Air Base, Delaware. While stationed in the Northeast, the squadron was primarily involved with delivering aircraft to the European Theater of Operations. In early 1943, the squadron moved to Love Field, Texas, and concentrated on ferrying aircraft from manufacturers to operational and training units. At the end of March 1944, Air Transport Command (ATC) reorganized its units in the United States under the Base Unit system, and the 12th was disbanded and with all other ATC units at Love Field was reorganized into the 555th AAF Base Unit. It was reconstituted and consolidated with the other predecessor units in September 1985.

=== Liaison tactics development ===
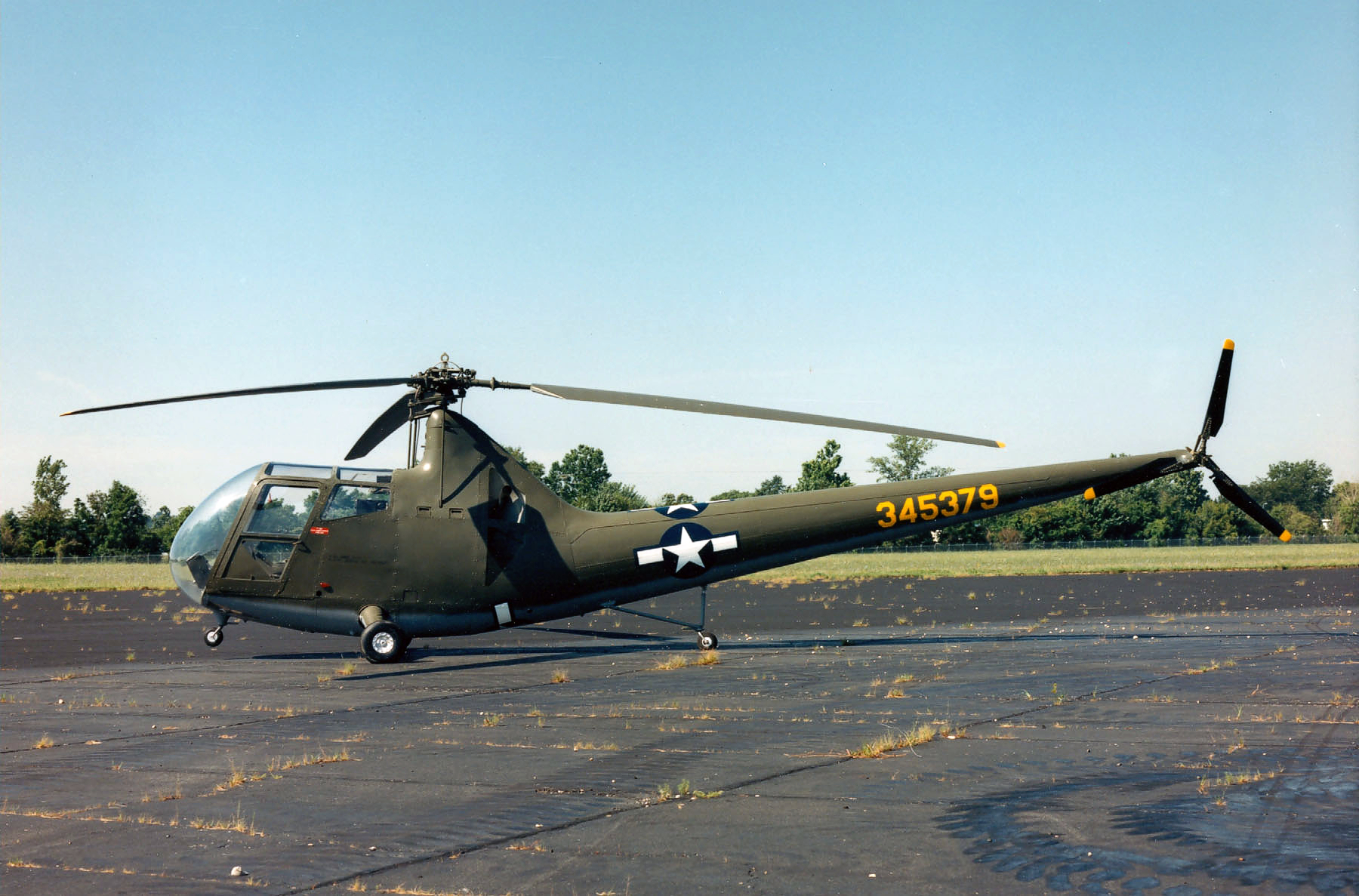
Sikorsky R-6 at the USAF museum

The squadron's second predecessor is the 162nd Liaison Squadron, which was activated at Aiken Army Air Field, South Carolina on 15 May 1944. Like most liaison squadrons, it was equipped with the Stinson L-5 Sentinel. The squadron developed tactics and tested equipment for liaison units in the Army Air Forces. In particular, during 1945, it tested the suitability of Sikorsky helicopters for the liaison mission. In December 1945, it moved to Brooks Field, Texas, where it operated with the 69th Reconnaissance Group through July. The squadron inactivated on 3 October 1946 and was consolidated with the other predecessor units in September 1985.

=== Medical evacuation ===
The 12th Aeromedical Transport Squadron was activated at McGuire Air Force Base, New Jersey on 8 November 1956, when the 1st Aeromedical Transport Group, which was stationed at Brooks Air Force Base, Texas, replaced the 1706th Air Transport Group. The group was responsible for aeromedical evacuation missions throughout the United States. The 12th Squadron was equipped with Convair C-131 Samaritans and was primarily responsible for evacuation missions in the northeastern United States. In June 1964, Military Air Transport Service (MATS) reorganized its medical evacuation squadrons under the 1405th Aeromedical Transport Wing, stationed at Scott Air Force Base, Illinois. In 1965, mission responsibility expanded to included Newfoundland and Labrador.

When Military Airlift Command (MAC) replaced MATS in January 1966, the 375th Aeromedical Airlift Wing replaced the 1405th Wing and the squadron became the 12th Aeromedical Airlift Squadron. It continued its mission until inactivating in June 1969 as the more capable Douglas C-9 Nightingale permitted consolidation of the medical evacuation mission in the United States into one location, Scott Air Force Base.

The three squadrons were consolidated into one in September, 1975 retaining the 12th Airlift designation, but have remained inactive.

== Lineage ==
12th Ferrying Squadron

- Constituted as the 12th Air Corps Ferrying Squadron on 18 February 1942

Activated on 8 April 1942
Redesignated 12th Ferrying Squadron c. 12 May 1943
Disbanded on 31 March 1944

- Reconstituted and consolidated with the 12th Aeromedical Airlift Squadron and 162d Liaison Squadron as the 12th Aeromedical Airlift Squadron on 19 September 1985

162nd Liaison Squadron

- Constituted as the 162nd Liaison Squadron on 11 May 1944

Activated on 15 May 1944
Inactivated on 3 October 1946

- Consolidated with the 12th Aeromedical Airlift Squadron and 12th Ferrying Squadron as the 12th Aeromedical Airlift Squadron on 19 September 1985

12th Aeromedical Airlift Squadron

- Constituted 18 October 1956 as the 12th Aeromedical Transport Squadron, Light

Activated on 8 November 1956
Redesignated 12th Aeromedical Transport Squadron on 25 July 1964
Redesignated 12th Aeromedical Airlift Squadron on 8 January 1966
Inactivated on 8 June 1969

- Consolidated with the 12th Ferrying Squadron and 162d Liaison Squadron on 19 September 1985

=== Assignments ===
- Northeast Sector, Air Corps Ferrying Command (later 2d Ferrying Group), 8 April 1942
- 5th Ferrying Group, c. 13 January 1943 – 31 March 1944
- III Tactical Air Division, 15 May 1944
- II Tactical Air Division, 24 June 1944
- III Tactical Air Command, 1 September 1945
- XIX Tactical Air Command, 25 October 1945
- Tactical Air Command, 21 March 1946
- Ninth Air Force, 28 March – 3 October 1946
- 1st Aeromedical Transport Group, 8 November 1956
- 1405th Aeromedical Transport Wing, 8 June 1964
- 375th Aeromedical Airlift Wing, 8 January 1966 – 8 June 1969

=== Stations ===
- Logan Field, Massachusetts, 8 April 1942
- New Castle Army Air Base, Delaware, c. 29 May 1942
- Love Field, Texas, c. 13 January 1943 – 31 March 1944
- Aiken Army Air Field, South Carolina, 15 May 1944
- Lafayette Airport, Louisiana, 13 July 1944
- Alexandria Army Air Field, Louisiana, 14 September 1945
- Brooks Field, Texas, 6 December 1945 – 3 October 1946
- McGuire Air Force Base, New Jersey, 8 November 1956 – 8 June 1969

=== Aircraft ===
- Stinson L-5 Sentinel, 1944-1946
- Sikorsky R-5 1945
- Sikorsky YR-6, 1945
- Convair C-131 Samaritan, 1956-1969

=== Awards and campaigns ===
| Award streamer | Award | Dates | Notes |
|---|---|---|---|
| | Air Force Outstanding Unit Award | 8 November 1956–31 December 1957 | 12th Aeromedical Transport Squadron |
| | Air Force Outstanding Unit Award | 1 January 1958–31 December 1963 | 12th Aeromedical Transport Squadron |
| | Air Force Outstanding Unit Award | 1 June 1964–7 January 1966 | 12th Aeromedical Transport Squadron |

| Campaign Streamer | Campaign | Dates | Notes |
|---|---|---|---|
| | American Theater without inscription | 8 April 1942 – 31 March 1944 | 12th Ferrying Squadron |
| | American Theater without inscription | 15 May 1944 – 2 March 1946 | 162nd Liaison Squadron |
