= RAF Chedworth =

Former Royal Air Force station in Gloucestershire, England

RAF Chedworth
- Near Chedworth, Gloucestershire in England
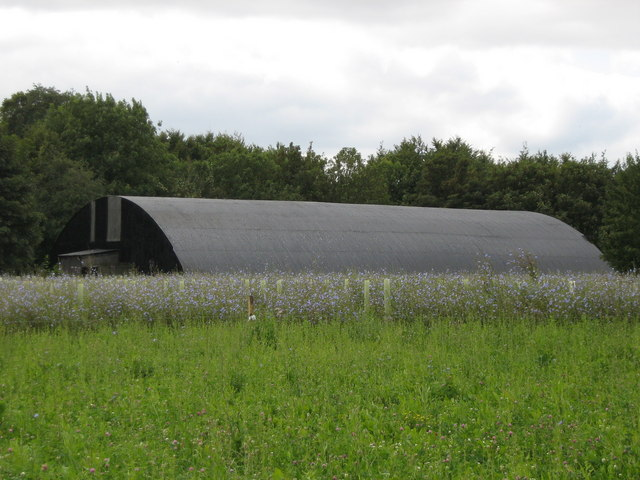
- Old aircraft hangar remaining intact at the disused airfield in 2007

Site information
- Type: Royal Air Force satellite station
- Code: YW
- Owner: Air Ministry
- Operator: Royal Air Force
- Controlled by: RAF Flying Training Command 1943; RAF Fighter Command1943- * No. 9 Group RAF * No. 81 (OTU) Group RAF

Location
- Shown within Gloucestershire RAF Chedworth (the United Kingdom)
- Coordinates: 51°48′58″N 001°56′24″W

Site history
- Built: 1941/42
- In use: April 1942 - May 1945
- Battles/wars: European theatre of World War II

Airfield information
- Elevation: 251 metres (823 ft) AMSL
Runways
Direction	Length and surface
02/20	1,230 metres (4,035 ft) Concrete
10/28	1,160 metres (3,806 ft) Concrete

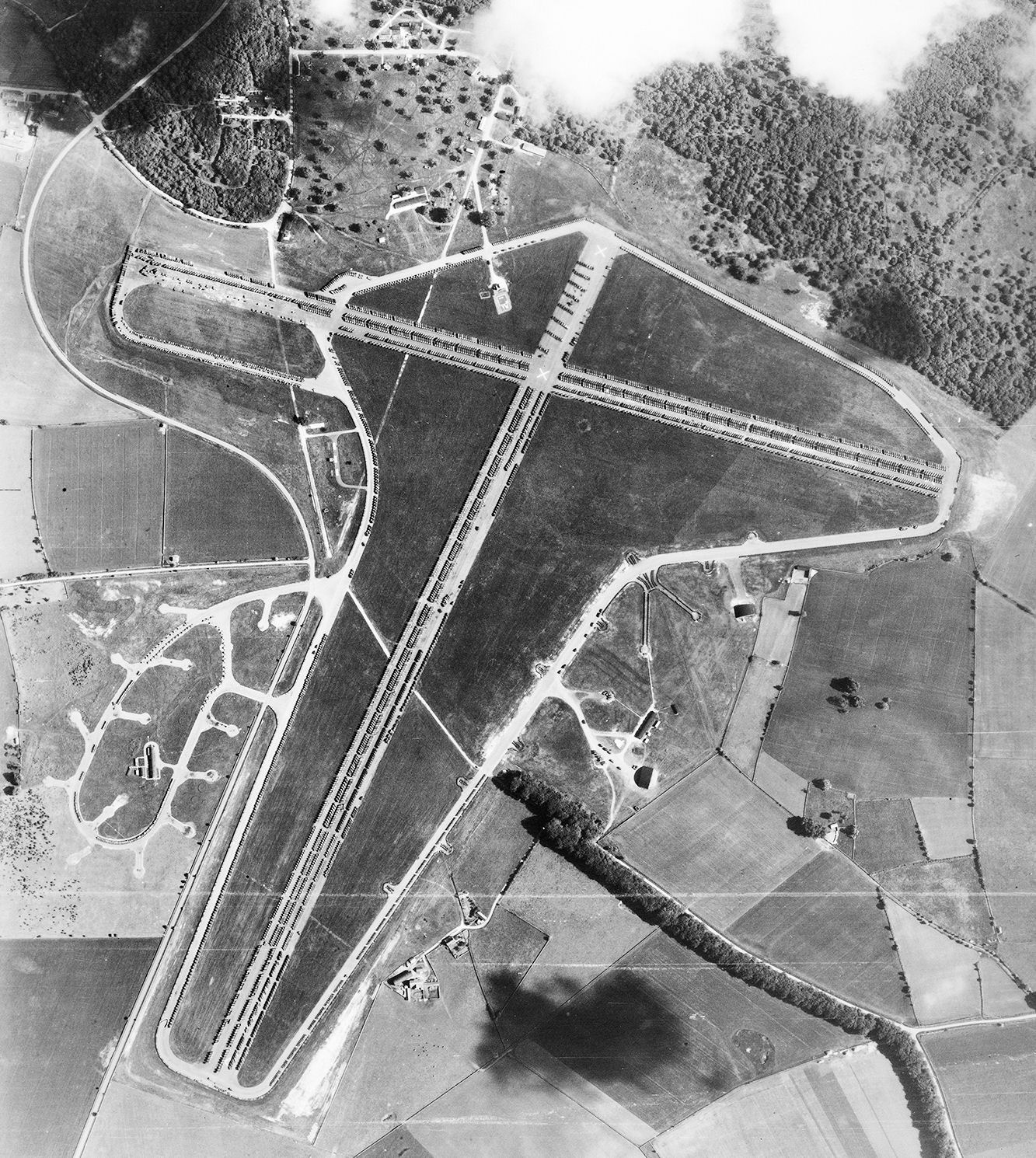
Aerial photograph of Chedworth airfield looking north, the control tower and airfield code are to the top left of the runway intersection, 7 June 1946.

Royal Air Force Chedworth or more simply RAF Chedworth is a former Royal Air Force satellite station located near Chedworth, Gloucestershire, England. It was used mostly for training during its existence and has been inactive since the 1980s.

== History ==
Construction of the airfield began in late 1941 and it opened in April 1942 as a satellite station to RAF Aston Down. The first users were detachments of No. 52 Operational Training Unit (OTU), flying Supermarine Spitfires and Miles Magisters. In August two flights were transferred to Chedworth. On 15 January 1943, the flights were assigned to the Flight Leaders School (FLS) within the OTU to teach tactics to fighter squadron and flight leaders. Chedworth proved to be too small and the FLS was transferred to RAF Charmy Down on 9 February.

The airfield came under the control of RAF South Cerney ten days later and was used for flight training by the Airspeed Oxfords of No. 3 and No. 6 (Pilots) Advanced Flying Units and a detachment of 6(P)AFU was based there for a few months. RAF Honiley assumed control of Chedworth in October and it was used by No. 2 (Air Gunnery) Squadron of No. 63 OTU and the Air Gunnery Squadron of No. 60 OTU. They formed a combined gunnery squadron that flew de Havilland Mosquitoes, Bristol Beaufighters and Miles Masters until they returned home in January 1944. 3 (P) AFU returned in a few months later to relieve the congestion at South Cerney. No. 3 Tactical Exercise Unit RAF arrived 17 July 1944, becoming No. 55 Operational Training Unit RAF on 18 December 1944 until 29 May 1945. The site was also used by No. 2800 Squadron RAF Regiment.

RAF Chedworth was also briefly home to the headquarters squadron of the Ninth Air Force of the United States Army Air Forces units during 19 June–9 July 1944 and was used by Piper L-4 Grasshoppers and Stinson L-5 Sentinels of the 125th Liaison Squadron.

== Current use ==
Much of the site remains, including most of the two runways, one blister hangar (of 2 originally), the armoury, and the battle HQ building, but the site is now primarily agricultural.

== Bibliography ==
- Berryman, D (2006). Action Stations Revisited: The Complete History of Britain's Military Airfields. Vol. 5: South West England (New ed.). Manchester: Crécy. ISBN 978-0-85979-121-2.
- Falconer, J. (2012). RAF Airfields of World War 2. UK: Ian Allan Publishing. ISBN 978-1-85780-349-5.}
