= Fürth Airfield =

Former military airfield in Germany

Fürth Airfield (R-28) Fliegerhorst Fürth

- Franconia, Germany Furth Airfield (Germany)

Site information
- Type: Military airfield (1915-1918 & after 1933) civilian airport (1920-1933)

Location
- Coordinates: 49°29′49″N 010°57′26″E

Site history
- Built: 1915
- Built by: Bavarian Army
- In use: 1915-1918 (Bavarian Army); 1920-1933 (civilian airport); 1939–1945 (Luftwaffe); 1945–1947 (United States Army Air Forces)

Fürth Airfield is a former military airfield located in Germany about 2 miles north-northeast of the city center of Fürth in the neighborhood "Atzenhof"; approximately 200 miles south-southwest of Berlin. During the Weimar Republic it served as the principal civil aviation hub of the Nuremberg metropolitan region. The airport was renamed from "Flughafen Fürth-Nürnberg" to "Flughafen Nürnberg-Fürth" to indicate the relative importance of the two cities (the population of Nuremberg is about five times that of Fürth) and because the municipal government of Nuremberg had by then taken over the majority of the (money-losing) operation. Nonetheless, all throughout the Weimar Republic, the city of Fürth tried to get rid of the financial burden and the city of Nuremberg looked for a suitable site to build an airport in Nuremberg proper – something which only came to fruition shortly after the Nazi takeover in 1933 with the opening of Marienberg Airport

In World War I there was a training center of the Royal Bavarian Air Force (part of the Bavarian Army). In the 1920s it was the first international airport of the cities Nürnberg and Fürth. The importance of the airport increased further when Junkers transferred first its central repair workshop, and then the final assembly line for its F-13 and G-24 aircraft from Dessau to Fürth. In 1935 it was again openly used for military purposes by the newly created Luftwaffe. Subsequently the airfield was used during World War II by the German Luftwaffe as a combat airfield. It was seized in early April 1945 by the United States Army and used as a Ninth Air Force combat airfield until the end of the war in Europe. Afterwards the "Army Airfield Station Fürth" was established here, being closed in June 1947. Then it became "Monteith-Barracks" of the US Army till it was closed in 1993.

Today, the airfield is abandoned and parts of the facility remain undeveloped as a relic – some of the former airport buildings are listed buildings. A golf course now covers parts of the former airport grounds.

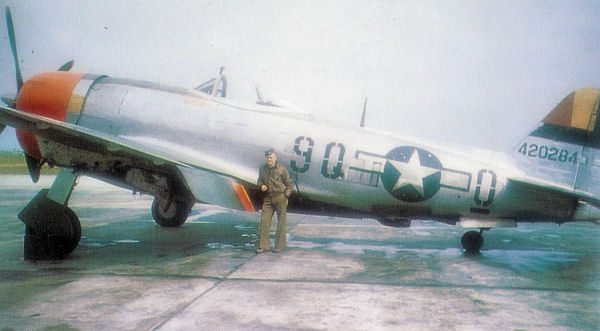
Republic P-47D-28-RE Thunderbolt Serial 44-200284 of the 404th Fighter Squadron (photo taken at Fürth/Industrieflughafen, Germany.)

About 2 km south of this Airfield there was the so-called "Industrieflughafen" In 1919 there was a factory of the Gothaer Waggonfabrik and in the late 1930s it was the airport of the Bachmann von Bluhmenthal Company (Industrieflughafen Fürth). Here till 1945 Bf 110s where build, repaired and converted into Nightfighters. At the end of the war it became Army Airfield R-30, then it became Nürnberg auxiliary International Airport till 1955 when the new Nürnberg International Airport was finished. Today it is completely overbuilt and known as the Hardhöhe. A small plaque in the access tunnel to the subway station Fürth Hardhöhe station is the only visible reminder of that airport today.

== See also ==
- Advanced Landing Ground
