= III Tactical Air Command =

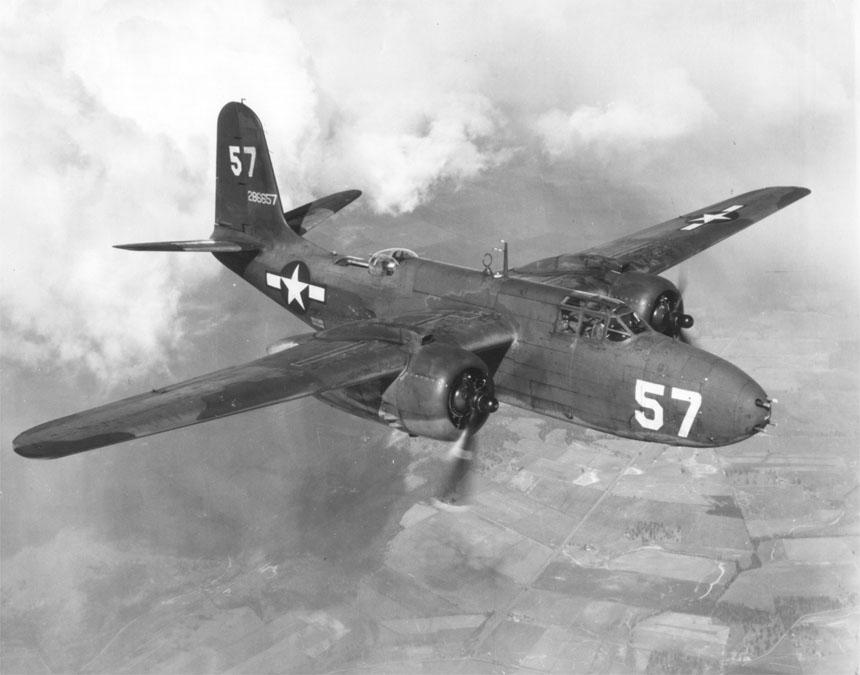
- A-20 Havoc light bomber from a training unit
- Active: 1942-1945
- Country: United States
- Branch: United States Air Force (Note: In September 1947, all former Air Corps units were transferred from the Army to the Air Force, including disbanded units.)
- Role: Command and training of tactical units
- Engagements: World War II

The III Tactical Air Command was a United States Army Air Forces formation. Its last assignment was with Third Air Force stationed at Barksdale Field, Louisiana. It was disbanded on 24 October 1945. The command was established in 1941 as the 3rd Air Support Command. It was responsible for training tactical units and aircrews for the Army Air Forces, except for the period from August 1943 through March 1944, when it specialized in training reconnaissance units.

== History ==
=== Background ===
General Headquarters Air Force (GHQ AF) reorganized its four regional air districts as Numbered Air Forces in the spring of 1941. By the fall of that year, each of these had organized as a support command and three combat commands. In the summer of 1941 GHQ AF decided to establish commands to direct its air support mission in each numbered air force, plus one additional command reporting directly to GHQ AF. 3rd Air Force organized 3rd Air Support Command. However, by early 1942, most of the command's trained personnel had moved overseas, leading GHQ AF to believe it had little more than the "remnants" of the command remaining. As a result, it was decided to disband the command on 16 March 1942. However, in May, the Army Air Forces (AAF) reaffirmed that each of the continental numbered air forces would have an air support command and the 3rd Air Force established a new 3rd Air Support Command at Birmingham Airport on 19 May.

=== Training tactical forces ===
The AAF determined that its continental air forces would specialize in their training operations and that all their air support commands would be reassigned to Third Air Force. At various times, the III Tactical Air Command trained dive bombardment, light bombardment, and reconnaissance organizations and personnel; also gave air support to ground units in training and participated in air-ground maneuvers and demonstrations. In October of 1942, AAF directed that half of the observation groups assigned to the command were to be reduced to 50% strength or less with their personnel used to form new tow target squadrons, or transferred to heavy bomber Operational Training Unit (OTU)s or Replacement Training Unit (RTU)s.

In the summer of 1943, the Army Air Forces had begun to act to combine tactical and photographic reconnaissance functions, and in July, directed Third Air Force to establish a reconnaissance command that would train all tactical and photographic units and operate replacement training units for the personnel of those units. As a result the command was redesignated III Reconnaissance Command and became the central training agency for reconnaissance units, with wings at Key Field and Will Rogers Field.

The command was disbanded in 1945. In 1947, when the United States Air Force (USAF) became independent, the Army transferred all Army Air Forces, Air Service and Air Corps units (there were a number of Air Corps units that had never been in the Army Air Forces, and a few Air Service units) to the USAF.

== Lineage ==
- Constituted as the 3rd Ground Air Support Command on 15 May 1942 (Note: Maurer and Haulman indicate the unit was constituted as the "III" Ground Air Support Command. However, the unit was constituted and activated with an arabic number in its name. The use of roman numerals to designate Army Air Forces combat commands did not begin until September 1942. "Air Force Historical Research Agency Organizational Reconds: Types of USAF Organizations". Air Force History Index. 9 January 2008..)

Activated on 19 May 1942.
Redesignated III Air Support Command c. 18 September 1942
Redesignated III Reconnaissance Command 18 August 1943
Redesignated III Tactical Air Command c. 10 March 1944
Disbanded on 24 October 1945

== Assignments ==
- Third Air Force, 19 May 1942 – 24 October 1945

== Components ==
Divisions

- I Tactical Air Division (later III Tactical Air Division, III Reconnaissance Command): c. 10 March 1944 – 1944
- II Tactical Air Division: c. 10 March 1944 – 24 October 1945
- III Tactical Air Division (later I Tactical Air Division): c. 10 March 1944 – 24 October 1945

Wings

- 22d Bombardment Training Wing: 5 December 1942 – 6 August 1943
- 88th Reconnaissance Training Wing: 18 August – 20 December 1943 (thereafter disbanded).
- 89th Reconnaissance Training Wing: 18 August 1943 – c. 1 April 1944

Groups

- 8th Photographic Reconnaissance Group (later 8th Reconnaissance Group), 1 October–27 October 1943
- 47th Bombardment Group, attached 29 June 1942, assigned 10 August – 27 September 1942
- 48th Bombardment Group, 10 August 1942 – 6 August 1943
- 67th Observation Group, 15 May – 23 June 1942; 4 July – 21 August 1942
- 69th Reconnaissance Group (later 69th Tactical Reconnaissance Group), 6 August – 9 October 1943
- 75th Observation Group (later 75th Reconnaissance Group, 75th Tactical Reconnaissance Group), c. 24 May 1942 – 18 April 1944
- 77th Observation Group (later 77th Reconnaissance Group, 77th Tactical Reconnaissance Group), assigned 24 May – 21 August 1942; attached 7 September 1942 – 5 August 1943; assigned 6 August 1943 – 30 November 1943
- 85th Bombardment Group, 10 August - 2 November 1942
- 312th Bombardment Group, 10 August 1942 – 20 February 1943
- 405th Bombardment Group (later 405th Fighter-Bomber Group), 1 March – 15 August 1943
- 410th Bombardment Group, 1 July – 6 August 1943 (attached to 46th Bombardment Group)
- 416th Bombardment Group, 5 February – 6 August 1943

Squadrons

- 1st Air Support Communications Squadron, c. 19 May – 3 November 1943 (attached to I Tactical Air Division after c. 8 September 1943)
- 1st Reconnaissance Squadron (Special) (later 41st Photographic Reconnaissance Squadron): 1 October – 4 December 1944
- 2nd Communications Squadron, Air Support: 31 May – 26 December 1942
- 2d Composite Squadron (see 6th Reconnaissance Squadron)
- 3d Composite Squadron (see 7th Reconnaissance Squadron)
- 6th Photographic Technical Squadron: 1 December 1943 – 13 May 1944
- 6th Reconnaissance Squadron (Special) (later 2d Composite Squadron): 20 August – 8 November 1943; 1 October 1944 – 25 October 1945
- 7th Reconnaissance Squadron (Special) (later 3d Composite Squadron): 20 August – 8 November 1943; 1 October 1944 – 25 October 1945
- 11th Communications Squadron, Air Support (later 11th Air Support Communications Squadron, 11th Air Support Control Squadron): 18 September 1942 – 11 December 1943
- 13th Air Support Communications Squadron: 15 January – 7 June 1943
- 14th Air Support Communications Squadron: 15 February – 3 March 1943
- 15th Air Support Communications Squadron: 15 February – 23 August 1943
- 18th Air Support Communications Squadron, 1 April – 3 November 1943
- 20th Tactical Reconnaissance Squadron: 23 August – 26 December 1943
- 24th Combat Mapping Squadron: 12 October – 26 December 1943
- 27th Photographic Reconnaissance Squadron: 12 October – c. 4 November 1943
- 28th Photographic Reconnaissance Squadron: 15 August – 27 September 1943
- 30th Photographic Reconnaissance Squadron: 12 October 1943 – 4 February 1944
- 31st Photographic Reconnaissance Squadron: 11 August 1943 – 31 March 1944
- 32d Photographic Reconnaissance Squadron: 11 August 1943 – c. 20 April 1944
- 33d Photographic Reconnaissance Squadron: 11 August 1943 – 1 May 1944
- 34th Photographic Reconnaissance Squadron: 11 August – 9 October 1943
- 35th Photographic Reconnaissance Squadron: 30 November 1943 – 5 May 1944
- 40th Photographic Reconnaissance Squadron: 21 October 1943 – 18 April 1944
- 41st Photographic Reconnaissance Squadron (see 1st Reconnaissance Squadron)
- 106th Reconnaissance Squadron, 23 August – 19 November 1943
- 118th Tactical Reconnaissance Squadron, c. 25 October 1943 – c. 16 February 1944
- 158th Liaison Squadron, 1 October – 13 December 1944
- 161st Liaison Squadron, 15 May – 24 June 1944; 1 September – 25 October 1945
- 162nd Liaison Squadron, 1 September – 25 October 1945
- 398th Fighter Squadron, 1 September – 25 October 1945 (attached to 372d Fighter Group after 2 October 1945)

== Stations ==
- Birmingham Airport (later Birmingham Army Air Base), Alabama, 19 May 1942
- Barksdale Field, Louisiana, c. 1 April 1944 – 24 October 1945
