= I Tactical Air Division =

Inactive United States Navy squadron

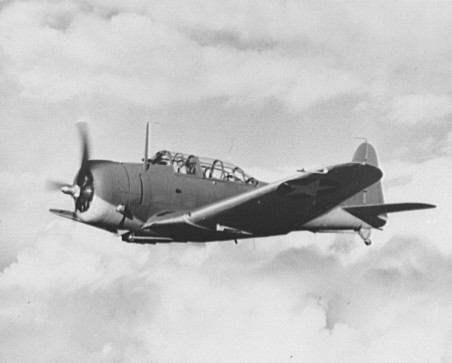
- A-24 Banshee, used in training dive bomber units
- Active: 1941–1945
- Country: United States
- Branch: United States Army; United States Air Force
- Role: Command and training of tactical units

The I Tactical Air Division is an inactive United States Air Force unit. It was last assigned to Second Air Force, based at Biggs Field, Texas. It was inactivated on 22 December 1945.

== History ==
General Headquarters Air Force (GHQ AF) reorganized its four regional air districts as Numbered Air Forces in the spring of 1941. By the fall of that year, each of these had organized as a support command and three combat commands.

In the summer of 1941 GHQ AF had decided to establish commands to direct its air support mission in each numbered air force, plus one additional command reporting directly to GHQ AF. These commands would be manned from inactivating wings, and would initially control only observation squadrons, which would be transferred from the control of the corps and divisions, although they would remain attached to these ground units. 4th Air Force organized 4th Air Support Command at Fresno Army Air Base, California in September 1941, soon moving to Will Rogers Field, Oklahoma where it drew cadre and equipment from the 15th Bombardment Wing, which was simultaneously inactivated. New observation groups were formed, with a cadre drawn from National Guard squadrons that had been mobilized in 1940 and 1941.

Following the attack on Pearl Harbor the command came under the control of the Western Theater of Operations and flew antisubmarine patrols off the Pacific coast. Most of the command's observation units were withdrawn form antisubmarine operations in June 1942, although some patrols continued until January 1943. However, by early 1942, the command's first commander, like two of the other commanders of air support commands had moved overseas, and similar personnel demands led GHQ AF to believe it had little more than the "remnants" of the command remaining.

The AAF determined that its continental air forces would specialize in their training operations and that all their air support commands would be reassigned to Third Air Force.

In August 1943, the command was redesignated the III Tactical Air Division with the intent that the command would engage in combined training with army ground forces.

At various times, it supervised heavy bomber flights to Hawaii, gave air support to ground units in training, participated in air-ground maneuvers, and put on air support demonstrations.

== Lineage ==
- Constituted as the 4th Air Support Command on 21 August 1941 (Note: Maurer indicates unit was constituted as the "IV" Air Support Command. However, the unit was constituted and activated with an arabic number in its name. The use of roman numerals to designate Army Air Forces combat commands did not begin until September 1942. "Air Force Historical Research Agency Organizational Reconds: Types of USAF Organizations". Air Force History Index. 9 January 2008.)

Activated on 3 September 1941
Redesignated 4th Ground Air Support Command 30 April 1942
Redesignated IV Air Support Command 12 September 1942
Redesignated III Tactical Air Division 4 September 1943
Redesignated I Tactical Air Division c. 15 April 1944
Inactivated on 22 December 1945
Disbanded on 8 October 1948

=== Assignments ===
- Fourth Air Force, 3 September 1941
- Second Air Force, 12 August 1942
- Desert Training Center, 21 January 1943
- Second Air Force, 1 December 1943
- III Tactical Air Command, c. 15 April 1944
- Third Air Force, 24 October 1945
- Second Air Force, 23 November – 22 December 1945

=== Stations ===
- Fresno Army Air Base, California, 3 September 1941
- Hamilton Field, California, 11 September 1941
- Presidio of San Francisco, California, 7 February 1942
- Thermal Army Airfield, California, 20 January 1943
- Camp Young, California, c. September 1943
- Thermal Army Air Field, California, c. 15 December 1943
- Esler Field, Louisiana, c. 13 April 1944
- Alexandria Army Air Base, Louisiana, September 1945
- Barksdale Field, Louisiana, c. 16 November 1945
- Biggs Field, Texas, c. 23 November – 22 December 1945

=== Components ===
Groups

- 12th Bombardment Group, 3 September 1941 – 21 January 1942
- 47th Bombardment Group, 3 September 1941 – 15 February 1942 (attached to IV Bomber Command after 17 December 1941)
- 69th Observation Group, 3 September 1941 – 21 August 1942
- 70th Observation Group, 13 September 1941 – November 1942
- 71st Observation Group, March 1942 – August 1942
- 75th Tactical Reconnaissance Group, 18 April – 1 May 1944
- 85th Bombardment Group, 2 November 1942 - 21 January 1943

Squadrons

- 3rd Observation Squadron: 7 September 1942 – 21 January 1943
- 4th Communications Squadron, Air Support (later 4th Air Support Communications Squadron): 5 June 1942 – 21 January 1943
- 5th Liaison Squadron: 11 August – 12 October 1943 (attached to 74th Tactical Reconnaissance Group 17 August – c. 15 September 1943)
- 7th Tow Target Squadron: (see Tow Target Detachment, March Field)
- 8th Photographic Squadron: 1 February – 29 March 1942
- 8th Tow Target Squadron: (see Tow Target Detachment, McChord Field)
- 10th Air Support Communications Squadron: 7 September 1941 – unknown
- 13th Air Support Communications Squadron (later 13th Tactical Air Communications Squadron): c. 7 June 1943 – 15 April 1944
- 31st Observation Squadron: 3 September 1941 – 29 March 1943 (attached to 69th Observation Group after December 1941)
- 39th Photographic Reconnaissance Squadron: 29 March 1944 – 12 April 1944
- 112th Liaison Squadron: 1 January – 4 June 1941
- 116th Observation Squadron: 3–13 September 1941
- 125th Liaison Squadron: c. 11 October 1943 – 4 June 1944 (attached to 76th Tactical Reconnaissance Group until January 1944)
- 155th Liaison Squadron: 10 January – 1 May 1944
- 156th Liaison Squadron: 10 February – 1 May 1944
- 157th Liaison Squadron: 18 April – 1 May 1944
- 161st Liaison Squadron: 24 June 1944 – 1 September 1945 (attached to Fourth Air Force, after 3 May 1945)
- 455th Fighter-Bomber Squadron: attached 8 March – 1 April 1944

Battalions

- 835th Engineer Aviation Battalion: c. 16 April 1942 – c. January 1943

Companies

- 319th Signal Company, Air Wing, 3 September 1941 – unknown

Detachments

- Tow Target Detachment, March Field (later 7th Tow Target Squadron), 3 September 1941 – November 1943
- Tow Target Detachment, McChord Field (later 8th Tow Target Squadron), 3 September 1941 – July 1942
