= Jacqueline Cochran Regional Airport =

Public airport in Riverside County, California

Jacqueline Cochran Regional Airport (former Thermal Army Air Field)
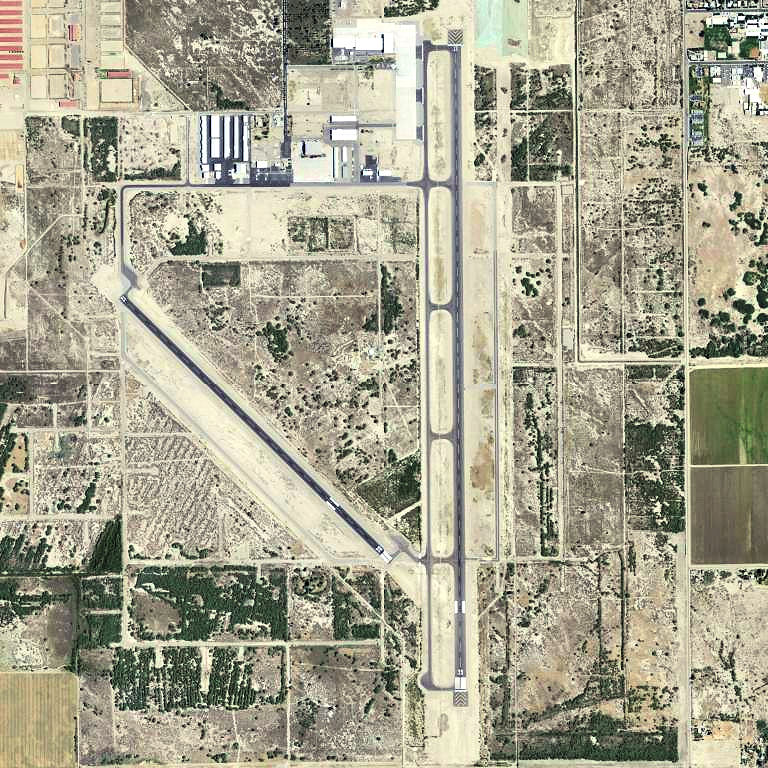
- USGS 2006 orthophoto
- IATA: TRM; ICAO: KTRM; FAA LID: TRM

Summary
- Airport type: Public
- Owner: County of Riverside
- Serves: Coachella Valley, California
- Location: Thermal, California
- Elevation AMSL: −115 ft (−35 m)
- Coordinates: 33°37′36″N 116°09′35″W
- Website: www.rcjcra.com

Map
- Location of airport in California TRM (the United States)

Runways
Direction	Length		Surface
Direction	ft	m	Surface
17/35	8,500	2,591	Asphalt
12/30	4,995	1,522	Asphalt

Statistics (2023)
- Aircraft operations (year ending 4/30/2023): 57,093
- Based aircraft: 94
- Source: Federal Aviation Administration

Jacqueline Cochran Regional Airport (IATA: TRM, ICAO: KTRM, FAA LID: TRM) is a county-owned, public-use airport in Riverside County, California, United States. It is located in the southeastern Coachella Valley, 20 nautical miles (23 mi, 37 km) southeast of the central business district of Palm Springs, in Thermal, California. This airport is included in the National Plan of Integrated Airport Systems for 2011–2015, which categorized it as a general aviation facility.

Built during World War II and used by both the US Army and US Navy, Jacqueline Cochran Regional Airport has had several name changes. As a civilian facility, it was called Thermal Airport from 1948 to 1998. To better reflect its regional function, the name was then changed to Desert Resorts Regional Airport. The most recent name change, to honor the pioneering aviator and Indio resident Jacqueline Cochran, took place in 2004. It is the first US airport named after a woman.

The airport is one mile (1.6 km) west of the California State Route 86 expressway and six miles (10 km) south of Interstate 10 in the lower Coachella Valley of central Riverside County, an area known as the Desert Resorts Region. The communities of Palm Springs, Palm Desert, Indian Wells, La Quinta, Rancho Mirage, Cathedral City, Coachella, Indio and Thermal surround the airport.

The facility hosts an air show in late November, showcasing both full-scale aircraft and radio-controlled models as flown by members of the Coachella Valley Radio Control Club. Due to that club's proximity to the facility, both the club and the airport work closely in mid-January to establish no-fly zones for the club's "Best In The West" national jet rally. A temporary model operational ceiling of 2000 ft (610m) is established during that time due to the size and speed of the models which participate.

== History ==
The airport was established in August 1942 at the beginning of World War II, and was used as an air support command base as part of the Desert Training Center in the Mojave Desert of Southern California. The mission of the training center was to prepare United States Army ground forces in preparation for Operation Torch—the invasion of North Africa. The center was commanded by General George Patton.

The airfield was known as Thermal Ground Support Base or Thermal Army Air Field. The 2,553-acre (10.33 km^{2}) facility had two 5,000 ft (1,500 m) runways and assigned the installation to Fourth Air Force. Between March 1943 and May 1944, the U.S. Army Air Forces assigned the 76th Reconnaissance Group along with several liaison and tactical reconnaissance squadrons to the airfield. In December 1943, Thermal AAF was reassigned to the California–Arizona Maneuver Area under control of the Third Air Force.

Located in the Coachella Valley 115 feet (35 m) below sea level, the area was named Thermal due to the area's high temperatures, with summer readings of 120 °F (49 °C) in the shade. Summer flight operations took place from 0300 to 1300 to combat the daytime heat, with no servicing performed during the middle of the day. In addition to flying operations, the station served as a pre-embarkation training center for aviation, construction, ordnance and other units.

Phased down in 1944 after most Army units had deployed overseas to combat areas, Thermal had been inactive for six months when the United States Navy requested permission to occupy the base on December 2, 1944, with the stipulation that the Army could reoccupy with 30 days' notice.

Initially known as Naval Air Bases Detachment Thermal, the base's facilities were in rather poor condition. During the first few months of the Navy's occupancy, ACORN (Aviation Construction, Ordnance and Repair - Navy) units and Seabees made extensive improvements. The airfield had a maximum capacity of 2,424 enlisted men and 264 officers. A hospital was located at the facility and had a maximum capacity of 119 patients, 68 nurses, 13 officers, and 16 enlisted men. There were approximately 254 buildings consisting of 237 military buildings built by the War Department and 17 non-military buildings (present at the time of base acquisition). The airfield was improved with approximately 250 buildings, heating, lighting, telephone, sewer, water and power systems. NAB Thermal provided pilot refresher training and aircraft strength reached 115, including the F6F Hellcat, F4U Corsair, TBM Avenger, SB2C Helldiver, and SBD Dauntless. Station aircraft consisted of a J4F, an N2S, an NE, and a GB.

The Navy closed Thermal on November 1, 1945, returning the field to the Army two months later. The site was declared surplus effective November 16, 1945, and transferred to the War Assets Administration (WAA) on January 23, 1947.

The War Assets Administration turned the military airfield to civil control during 1947 and 1948. Approximately 39 acres (160,000 m^{2}) were deeded on June 20, 1947, to United Date Growers of California. Approximately 40 acres (160,000 m^{2}) were deeded on September 2, 1947, to Coachella Valley County Water District. On December 21, 1948, it was returned to the County of Riverside via quitclaim deed for use as a municipal airport.

== Current era ==
Today, Thermal is a municipal airport serving general aviation. It is divided into 17 parcels totaling 2,549 acres (10.32 km^{2}) of land owned by both public and private entities. Approximately 2,285 acres (9.25 km^{2}) are owned by the County of Riverside for use as a municipal airport. The balance is used for agriculture and airpark development. Approximately 188 acres (0.76 km^{2}) of the property transferred from the DoD to the County of Riverside were subsequently transferred to private parties.

The airport sees consistently high passenger usage annually in the December - March time periods, due to a heavy influx of wealthy equestrian participants in the Coachella Desert Circuit horse show.

== Airline and destinations ==
=== Passenger ===
Airlines	Destinations
Aero	Charter: Los Angeles–Van Nuys

== Facilities and aircraft ==
Jacqueline Cochran Regional Airport covers an area of 1,850 acres (749 ha) at an elevation of 115 feet (35 m) below mean sea level. It has two asphalt paved runways: 17/35 is 8,500 by 150 feet (2,591 x 46 m) and 12/30 is 4,995 by 100 feet (1,522 x 30 m).

For the 12-month period ending April 30, 2023, the airport had 57,093 aircraft operations, an average of 156 per day: 80% general aviation, and 20% air taxi. At that time there were 94 aircraft based at this airport: 50 single-engine, 16 multi-engine, 18 jet, and 10 helicopter.

There are three fixed base operators (FBO) on the field: Thermal Aviation, the only self-serve; and two full-service FBOs, Desert Jet Center, and Atlantic Aviation. Desert Jet also provides (Part 135) Private Jet Air Charter services, Aircraft Management solutions, and the only FAA Certified Part 145 Repair Station in the Coachella Valley, performing onsite aircraft maintenance, repair, and inspections. Desert Jet Maintenance also provides AOG (Aircraft on Ground) support to Palm Springs (KPSP) and Bermuda Dunes (KUDD) airports with their mobile unit. Affordable Avionics operates out of Atlantic Aviation and is the only avionics company on the airport.

Coachella Valley Youth Aviation Education Program operates out of Thermal Aviation and is a non-profit organization that trains local kids, during the summer, on aviation from pilot to ground crew. The local EAA chapter 1116 is based at Thermal Aviation where they have meetings and do Young Eagle flights during the winter.

== See also ==
- California World War II Army Airfields
- Desert Training Center

== Other sources ==
- Maurer, Maurer (1983). Air Force Combat Units Of World War II. Maxwell AFB, Alabama: Office of Air Force History. ISBN 0-89201-092-4.
- Maurer, Maurer (1969), Combat Squadrons of the Air Force, World War II, Air Force Historical Studies Office, Maxwell AFB, Alabama. ISBN 0-89201-097-5
- Shaw, Frederick J. (2004), Locating Air Force Base Sites History's Legacy, Air Force History and Museums Program, United States Air Force, Washington DC, 2004.
