= 3rd Combat Weather Squadron =

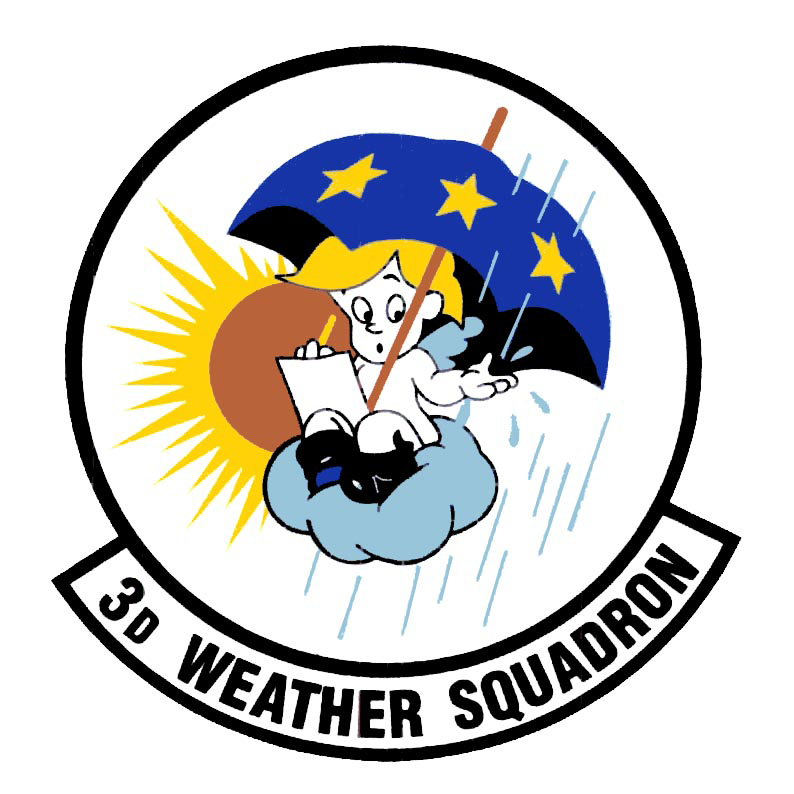
- 3rd Weather Squadron Patch
- Active: 24 June 1935-Present
- Country: United States
- Branch: Air Force Weather Agency
- Type: Squadron
- Role: Environmental Intelligence
- Part of: United States Air Force/Air Combat Command/Fifteenth Air Force/93rd Air-Ground Operations Wing/3d Air Support Operations Group
- Garrison/HQ: Robert Gray Army Airfield

The 3rd Combat Weather Squadron (3 CWS) is a unit of the United States Air Force. It was formed at Barksdale Field (now Barksdale Air Force Base), Louisiana, on 24 June 1937, as part of the Signal Corps. The 3rd was one of three original squadrons that eventually transferred from the Signal Corps to the Air Corps. Currently located at West Fort Hood, the 3rd Combat Weather Squadron is aligned under the 5th Combat Weather Group (5 CWG). Weather support to Fort Hood began in 1947 at the newly constructed Killeen AFB. Today, the 3rd Combat Weather Squadron—in addition to providing weather support to the Fort Cavazos complex—has operating locations at Forts Bliss, Huachuca, Riley, and Sill in Texas, Arizona, Kansas, and Oklahoma, respectively.

The 3rd Combat Weather Squadron is currently the largest base- or post-level weather unit in the Air Force. The support provided by the squadron is as diverse as its history and that of the Army customers it supports. The squadron maintains a 24-hour observing and forecasting section at Robert Gray Army Airfield with extended observing hours at Yoakum–DeFrenn Army Heliport.

The squadron patch is Walt Disney's Cupid which was sold to the unit for one US dollar during World War II, in efforts to raise troop morale.

== Combat Weather Teams ==
There are five Combat Weather Teams (CWTs) that support the following Army units at Fort Cavazos:

- III Corps.
- 1st Cavalry Division.
- 1st Cavalry Aviation Brigade.
- 4th Infantry Division (Mechanized).
- 4th Infantry Aviation Brigade.

== Operations in Iraq ==
On 13 December 2003, 4ID combat weather forecasters produced planning and mission execution forecasts for Operation Red Dawn, which led to successful capture of Saddam Hussein.

== See also ==
- List of United States Air Force weather squadrons
