= 11th Air Support Operations Squadron =

United States Air Force squadron

- Active: 1942–1945; 1994–2018
- Country: United States
- Branch: United States Air Force
- Role: Control of close air support
- Size: Squadron
- Mottos: Watchful and Ready
- Engagements: European Theater of Operations
- Decorations: Air Force Meritorious Unit Award; Air Force Outstanding Unit Award

Insignia
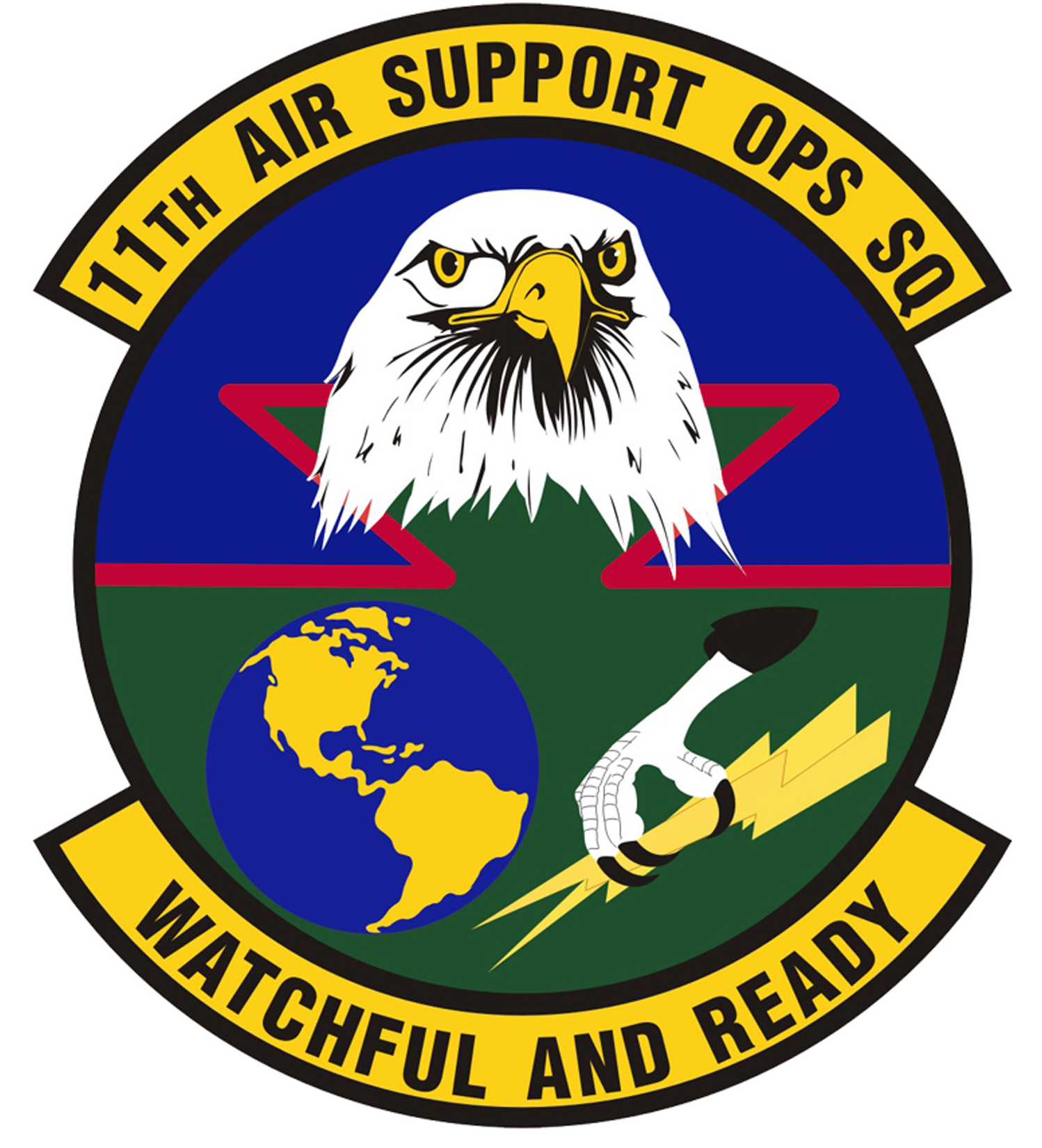
- 11th Air Support Operations Squadron emblem (Note: Approved 26 March 1988.)

The United States Air Force's 11th Air Support Operations Squadron was a combat support unit located at Fort Hood, Texas. The squadron provided tactical command and control of airpower assets to the Joint Forces Air Component Commander and Joint Forces Land Component Commander for combat operations.

== History ==
=== World War II ===
The squadron saw combat in the European Theater of Operations from D-Day to V-E Day. Its air support parties primarily served United States Third Army units, directing air support missions for the ground forces they served. It provided three teams that participated in airborne and amphibious landings in the initial 6 Jun 1944 D-Day invasion.

=== Post Cold War ===
The squadron was reactivated as the 11th Air Support Operations Squadron in 1994 to support the 2nd Armored Division which was later re-flagged as 4th Infantry Division. When 4th Infantry Division was restationed at Fort Carson, Colorado, the Squadron provided support to the 3d Armored Cavalry Regiment, later renamed 3d Cavalry Regiment. It provided Air Liaison Officers, Joint Terminal Attack Controllers and Combat Mission Support Teams that administered airpower to ground forces until inactivating in 2018. After 24 years of service, the squadron was inactivated in a ceremony at Fort Hood, Texas on 21 June 2018. Personnel of the unit was absorbed into the 9th Air Support Operations Squadron, also based at Fort Hood.

== Lineage ==
- Constituted as the 11th Communications Squadron, Air Support on 9 September 1942

Activated on 18 Sep 1942
Redesignated 11th Air Support Communication Squadron on 11 January 1943
Redesignated 11th Air Support Control Squadron on 20 August 1943
Redesignated 11th Tactical Air Communications Squadron on 1 April 1944
Inactivated on 12 October 1945

- Disbanded on 8 October 1948
- Reconstituted and redesignated 11th Air Support Operations Squadron on 24 June 1994

Activated on 1 July 1994.
Inactivated c. 21 June 2018

=== Assignments ===
- III Air Support Command (later III Reconnaissance Command, III Tactical Air Command), 18 September 1942
- IX Fighter Command, 11 December 1943
- Ninth Air Force, c. 1 February 1944
- IX Air Support Command, 26 February 1944
- XIX Air Support Command (later XIX Tactical Air Command), 4 March 1944
- XII Tactical Air Command, 4 July – c. 12 October 1945
- 3d Air Support Operations Group, 1 Jul 1994 – c. 21 June 2018

=== Stations ===
- Birmingham Army Air Base, Alabama, 18 September 1942
- Key Field, Mississippi, 26 February 1943
- Lebanon Army Air Field, Tennessee, c. 30 May 1943
- Birmingham Army Air Base, Alabama, c. 22 September – 16 November 1943
- RAF Aldermaston (Sta 467), England, 10 December 1943
- Aldermaston Court (Sta 476), England, 14 January 1944
- Sunninghill Park (Sta 472), England, 12 February 1944
- Aldermaston Court (Sta 476) England, 1 March 1944
- Cricqueville Airfield (A-2), France, 9 Jul 1944
- Nehou, France, 12 July 1944
- Le Bingard, France, 31 July 1944
- Mesnil-Rousset, France, 4 August 1944
- Poilley, France, 8 August 1944
- Andouille, France, 16 August 1944
- Autainville, France, 31 August 1944
- Chalons-en-Champagne, France, 13 September 1944
- Etain Airfield (A-82), France, 24 September 1944
- Nancy, France, 14 October 1944
- Luxembourg, Luxembourg, 16 January 1945
- Idar-Oberstein, Germany, 28 March 1945
- Hersfeld, Germany, 9 April 1945
- Erlangen (R-96), Germany, 26 April – c. September 1945
- Camp Patrick Henry, Virginia, 12 Oct 1945
- Fort Hood, Texas, 1 Jul 1994 – c. 21 June 2018
