= 3rd Air Support Operations Group =

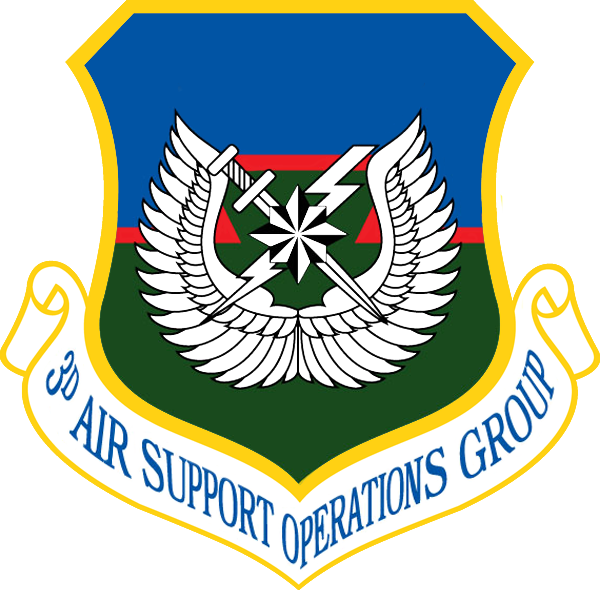
- 3rd Air Support Operations Group emblem
- Active: 1971 – present
- Country: United States
- Branch: United States Air Force
- Type: Combat Support
- Role: III Corps Air Support Operations
- Part of: ACC/93 AGOW
- Garrison/HQ: Fort Hood, Texas
- Engagements: Kuwait Liberation Medal (Saudi Arabia) Liberation of Kuwait

- Decorations: MUA AFOUA

The United States Air Force's 3rd Air Support Operations Group (3 ASOG) is a combat support unit located at Fort Hood, Texas. The 3 ASOG provides Tactical Command and Control of air power assets to the Joint Forces Air Component Commander and Joint Forces Land Component Commander for combat operations.

== Mission ==
The mission of the 3 ASOG is to train, deploy, and focus combat airpower and integrated weather operations for the Joint Force commander alongside III Corps or any supported land force commander, anytime, anywhere.

== Subordinate organizations ==
- 3rd Combat Weather Squadron
- 7th Air Support Operations Squadron (Fort Bliss, Texas; supports 1st Armored Division)
- 9th Air Support Operations Squadron (Fort Hood, Texas; provides Tactical Command and Control of air power assets to the Joint Forces Air Component Commander and Joint Forces Land Component Commander for combat operations
- 10th Air Support Operations Squadron(Fort Riley, Kansas; supports 1st Infantry Division)
- 11th Air Support Operations Squadron (inactivated 21 June 2018; absorbed into the 9 ASOS)
- 13th Air Support Operations Squadron (Fort Carson, Colorado; supports 4th Infantry Division)
- 712th Air Support Operations Squadron (Fort Hood, Texas; supports 3rd Armored Cavalry Regiment)(squadron inactivated and reflagged as the 803rd Operation Support Squadron on 28 September 2018)
