= 817th Expeditionary Air Support Operations Squadron =

- Country: United States of America
- Branch: USAF
- Role: Expeditionary Air Support Operations
- Size: Squadron
- Part of: Joint Forces Air Component Commander and Joint Forces Land Component Commander
- Garrison/HQ: somewhere in the Middle East

Insignia
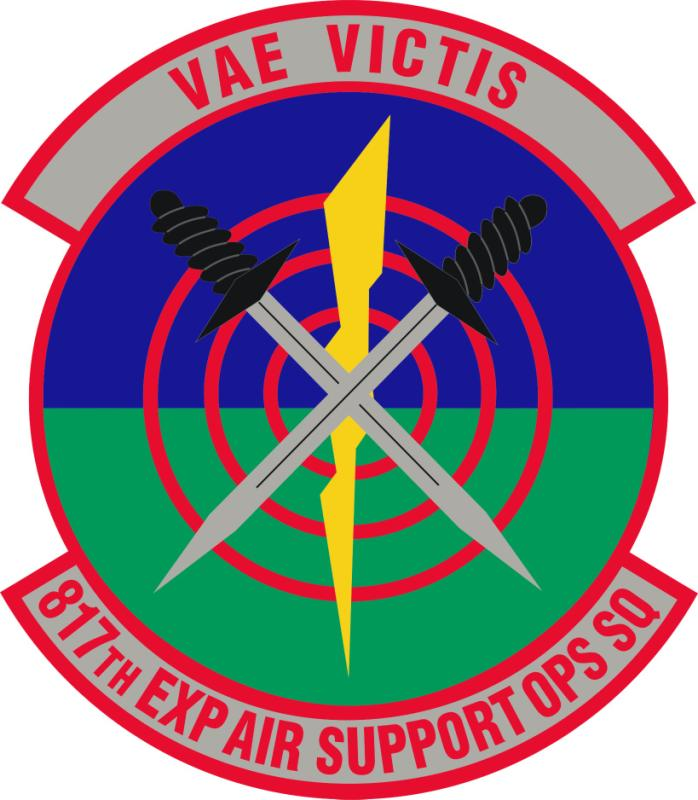
- 817th EASOS Emblem

The United States Air Force's 817th Expeditionary Air Support Operations Squadron (817 EASOS) is a combat support unit located at an undisclosed location in the Middle East. The 817 EASOS provides Tactical Command and Control of air power assets to the Joint Forces Air Component Commander and Joint Forces Land Component Commander for combat operations.

== Lineage ==
The lineage of the 817th Air Support Operations Squadron from inception to 2009:

- Constituted as 817th Air Support Operations Squadron on 27 May 1994

Activated on 1 July 1994
Inactivated on 30 September 1996

- Redesignated 817th Expeditionary Air Support Operations Squadron, and converted to provisional status, on 12 February 2009

=== Assignments ===
The assignments of the 817th Air Support Operations Squadron from inception to 2009:

- 617th Air Support Operations Group, 1 July 1994
- Third Air Force, 1 August-30 Sep 1996
- Air Combat Command to activate or inactivate at any time on or after 12 February 2009

=== Stations ===
The stations of the 817th Air Support Operations Squadron from inception to 2009:

- Wurzburg, Germany, 1 July 1994 – 30 September 1996

=== Decorations ===
- Air Force Outstanding Unit Award: [1 July 1994]-31 August 1995
