= 7th Air Support Operations Squadron =

7th Air Support Operations Squadron

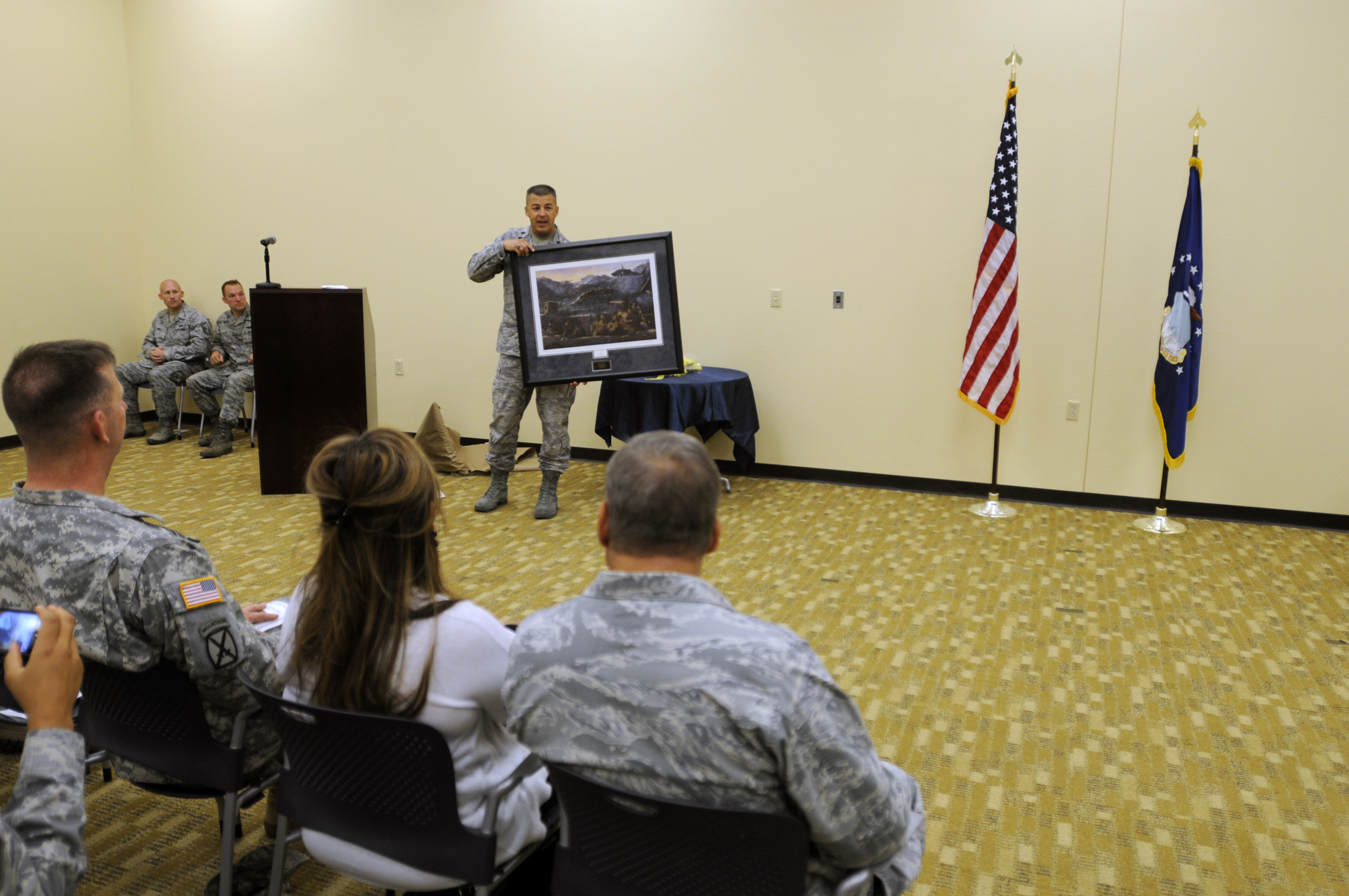
- Active: 1944–1945; 2008–present
- Country: United States
- Branch: United States Air Force
- Role: control of Air Support
- Part of: Air Combat Command
- Garrison/HQ: Fort Bliss, Texas
- Nickname(s): Hustlers
- Engagements: China-Burma-India Theater
- Decorations: Air Force Meritorious Unit Award; Air Force Outstanding Unit Award

Insignia
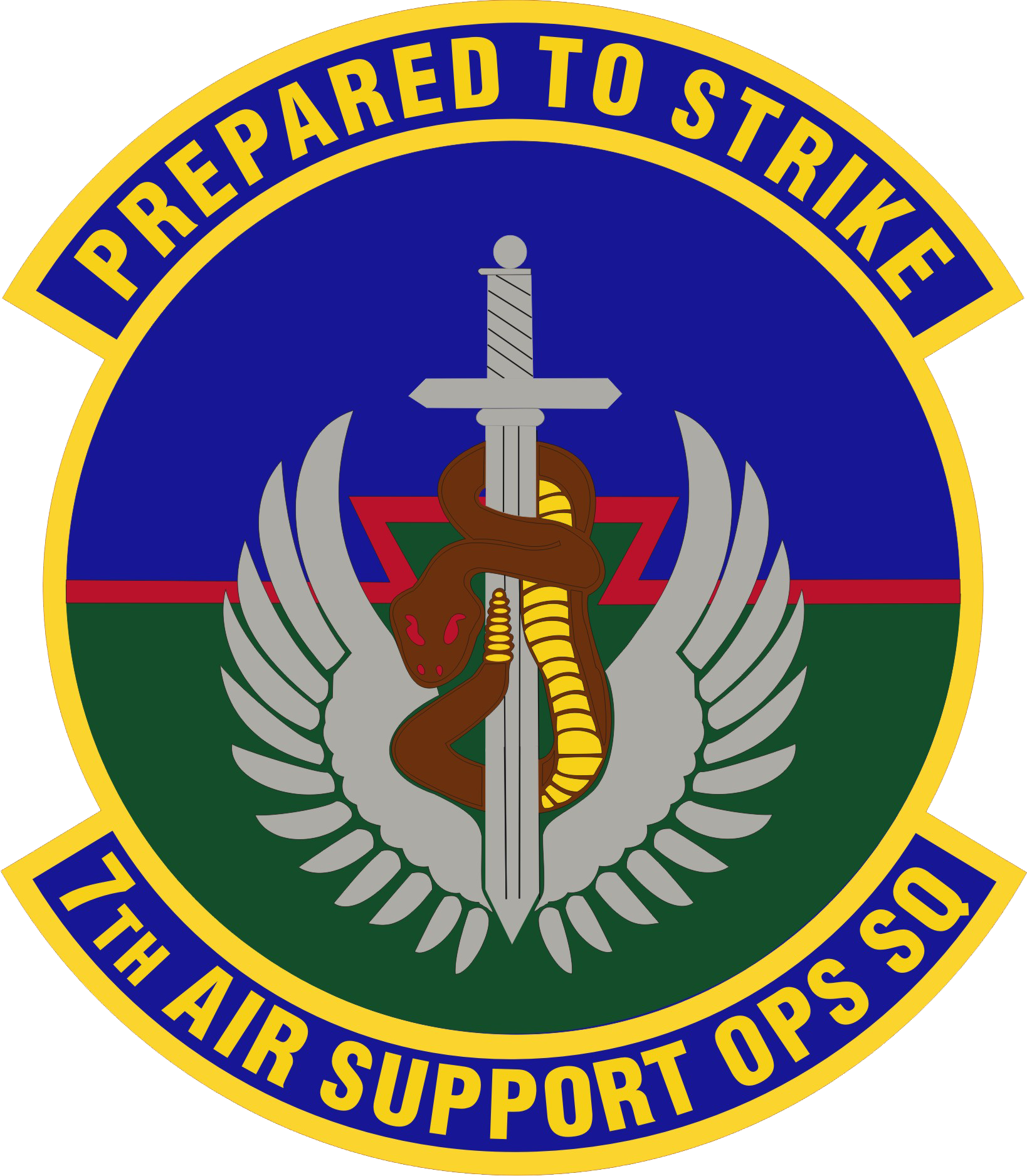
- 7th Air Support Operations Squadron emblem (approved 26 October 2009)

The United States Air Force's 7th Air Support Operations Squadron is a combat support unit located at Fort Bliss, Texas.

== Mission ==
The squadron provides tactical command and control of air power assets to the Joint Forces Air Component Commander and Joint Forces Land Component Commander for combat operations. The desert terrain of Fort Bliss offers a perfect training ground for Joint Terminal Attack Controllers to continue their training. The support the 7th offers the Army is deploying with its divisions, for example, the 1AD (1st Armored Division), and acting as the gateway to the Air Force's attack aircraft to neutralize any hostile threats that the Army division themselves cannot face.

== Lineage ==
- Constituted as the 7th Air Base Communications Detachment (Special) on 27 January 1944

Activated on 17 February 1944
Inactivated on 7 December 1945
Disbanded on 8 October 1948

- Reconstituted and redesignated 7th Air Support Operations Squadron on 12 August 2008
- Activated on 15 August 2008

=== Assignments ===
- Western Signal Aviation Unit Training Center, 17 February 1944

Unknown, 19 April – 10 July 1944

- Tenth Air Force, 11 July 1944
- Fourteenth Air Force, 30 September 1944
- 312th Fighter Wing, 13 March–7 December 1945
- 3d Air Support Operations Group, 15 August 2008 – present

=== Stations ===
- Camp Pinedale, California, 17 February 1944
- Camp Patrick Henry, Virginia, 19 April–3 May 1944
- Oran, Algeria, 21–28 May 1944
- New Delhi, India, 11 July 1944
- Kanchrapara, India, 15 August 1944
- Shuangliu, China, 25 November 1944
- India, unknown – 8 November 1945
- Camp Kilmer, New Jersey, 6–7 December 1945
- Fort Bliss, Texas, 15 August 2008 – present
