= Robert Manning Gray =

Army Air Forces pilot (1919–1942)

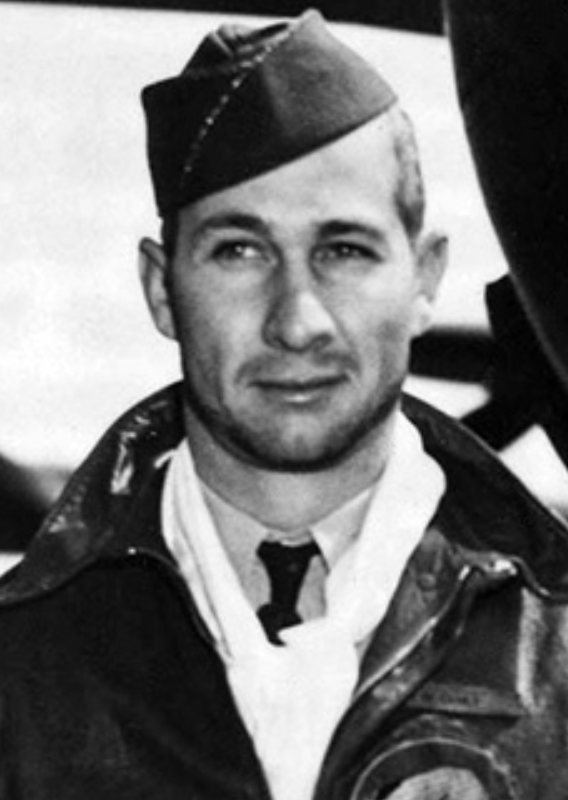
- Gray in 1942
- Born: May 24, 1919; Killeen, Texas, U.S.
- Died: October 18, 1942 (aged 23); Assam Province, British India
- Burial place: 1942: Barrackpore, India; 1951: Killeen City Cemetery
- Military career
- Allegiance: United States of America
- Branch: United States Army Air Forces
- Service years: 1940–1942
- Rank: Captain
- Nickname: Bob
- Units: 95th Bomb Squadron, 17th Bomb Group; 11th Bomb Squadron of the 7th and 341st Bomb Groups
- Conflicts: World War II: Pacific War; Doolittle Raid; China Burma India theater †
- Awards: Distinguished Flying Cross; Purple Heart; Air Medal

Robert Manning Gray (May 24, 1919 – October 18, 1942) was a United States Army Air Forces pilot who was the pilot of B-25B (#40-2270), "Whiskey Pete", during the Doolittle Raid in World War II and is the namesake of Robert Gray Army Airfield near Killeen, Texas.

== Biography ==
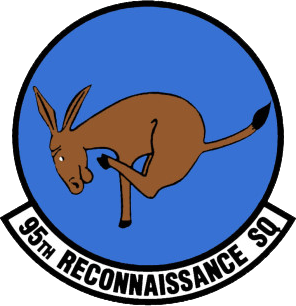
Insignia of 95th Bombardment Squadron, worn by Gray during Doolittle Raid

Gray was born in Killeen on May 24, 1919. He graduated from Killeen High School where he was a football player for the Kangaroos. He attended Tarleton College (now Tarleton State University) participated in the Reserve Officer's Training Corps and earned his pilot's license. He also attended Texas A&M known then as Texas A.M.C.

In June 1940, he left college to attend the US Air Corps’ Aviation Cadet Program at Kelly Field in San Antonio and in 1941 was commissioned a 2nd Lieutenant and a B-25 bomber pilot. After graduation, he was first assigned to the 34th Bomb Squadron and then transferred to the 95th Bombardment Squadron of 17th Bombardment Group at McChord Field, Washington flying anti-submarine patrols. Gray's crew was one of 24 crews picked by Lt. Col. James Doolittle to fly off the deck of the aircraft carrier USS Hornet (CV-8) on April 18, 1942. His bomber, the Whiskey Pete, was the third to take off and bombed targets in Tokyo and the crew flew to China and bailed out due to a lack of fuel. Gray was promoted to captain and awarded the Distinguished Flying Cross and the Chinese Armed Forces Medal. All of Gray's crew survived the mission, except Corporal Leland Dale Faktor, their engineer-gunner, was killed in the jump.

The other crew members of the Whiskey Pete included: navigator 2nd Lt. Charles Ozuk, bombardier Sgt. Aden Jones, and co-pilot 2nd Lt. Jacob Manch.

After the raid, Captain Gray would be assigned to the China-Burma-India Theater and fly out of India. He was killed on October 18, 1942, when his B-25 bomber crashed in a combat mission over Assam.

In 1942, Killeen mayor R.T. Polk declared April 18 Bob Gray Day and every mayor since has done so on an annual basis. Gray Street in Killeen was also renamed in his honor. Veterans of Foreign Wars Post 9192 in Killeen is named the Bob Gray VFW Post.

In 1944, character actor Robert Mitchum would portray Gray in the movie 30 Seconds over Tokyo.

In 1948, the Air Force named Robert Gray Air Force Base, near Fort Hood, Texas after him. The base was handed over to the Army in 1963 and became Robert Gray Army Air Field.

== Awards and decorations ==
His decorations include:

United States Army Air Forces pilot badge
| Distinguished Flying Cross | | Purple Heart |
| Air Medal | American Defense Service Medal | Asiatic-Pacific Campaign Medal w/ two 3/16" bronze stars |
| World War II Victory Medal | Republic of China Medal of the Armed Forces; A-1 | Republic of China War Memorial Medal |

His Distinguished Flying Cross citation reads:

The President of the United States of America, authorized by Act of Congress, July 2, 1926, takes pleasure in presenting the Distinguished Flying Cross to First Lieutenant (Air Corps) Robert Manning Gray, United States Army Air Forces, for extraordinary achievement as Pilot of a B-25 Bomber of the 1st Special Aviation Project (Doolittle Raider Force), while participating in a highly destructive raid on the Japanese mainland on 18 April 1942. First Lieutenant Gray with 79 other officers and enlisted men volunteered for this mission knowing full well that the chances of survival were extremely remote, and executed his part in it with great skill and daring. This achievement reflects high credit on himself and the military service.
