= 9th Air Support Operations Squadron =

- Active: 1942–1945; 1994–present
- Country: United States
- Branch: United States Air Force
- Role: Expeditionary Air Support Operations
- Part of: Air Combat Command
- Garrison/HQ: Fort Hood, Texas
- Engagements: Southwest Pacific Theater
- Decorations: Air Force Meritorious Unit Award; Air Force Outstanding Unit Award; Philippine Presidential Unit Citation

Insignia
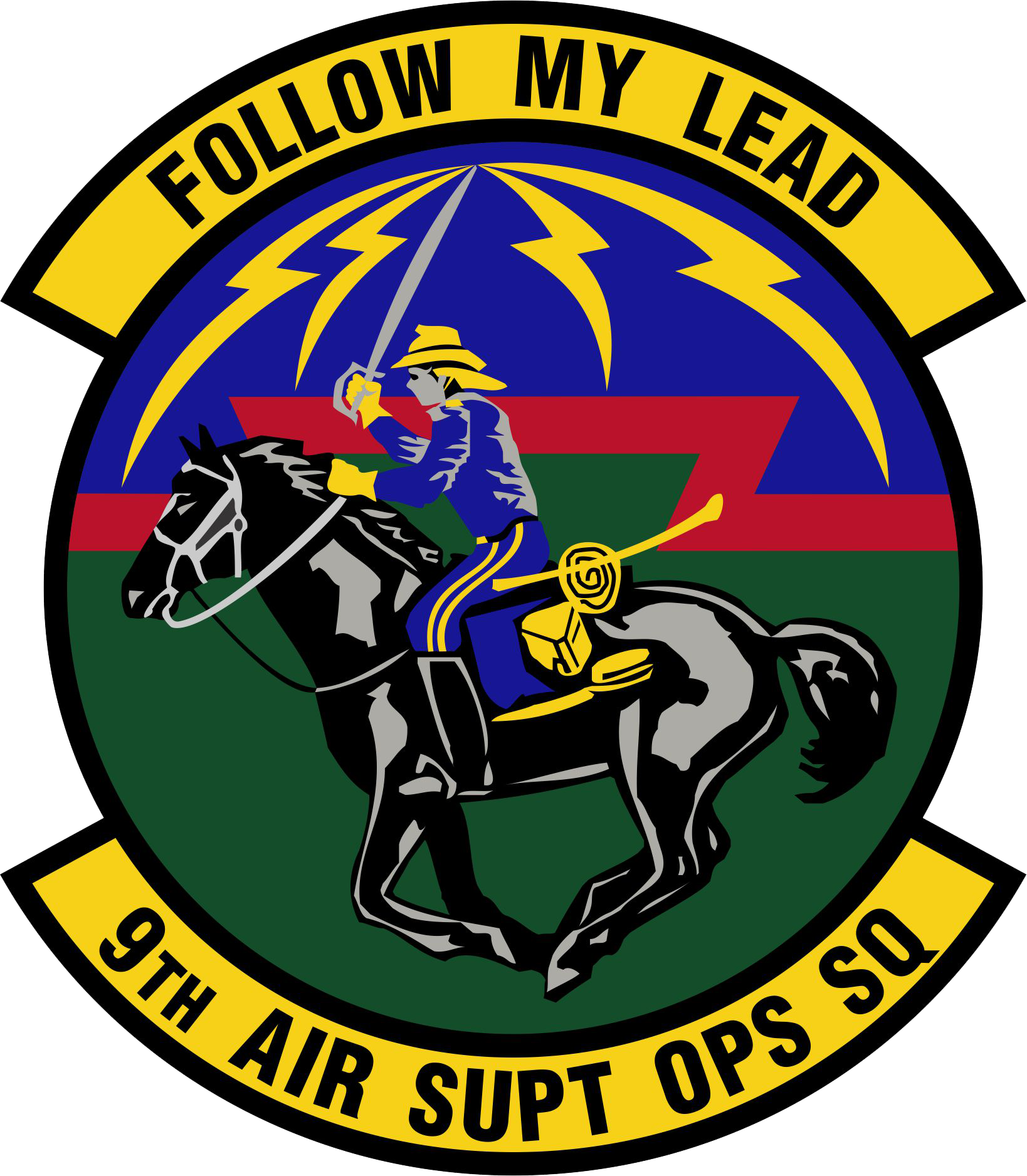
- 9th Air Support Operations Squadron emblem (Note: Approved 18 April 1997.)

The United States Air Force's 9th Air Support Operations Squadron is a combat support unit located at Fort Hood, Texas. The squadron provides tactical command and control of airpower assets to the Joint Forces Air Component Commander and Joint Forces Land Component Commander for combat operations.

== Lineage ==
- Constituted as the 9th Communications Squadron, Air Support, on 10 August 1942

Activated on 21 August 1942
Redesignated 9th Air Support Communication Squadron on 11 January 1943
Redesignated 9th Air Support Control Squadron on 20 August 1943
Redesignated 9th Tactical Air Communications Squadron on 1 April 1944
Inactivated on 28 November 1945

- Disbanded on 8 October 1948
- Reconstituted and redesignated 9th Air Support Operations Squadron on 24 June 1994

Activated on 1 July 1994

=== Assignments ===
- I Ground Air Support Command (later I Air Support Command, I Tactical Air Division), 21 August 1942
- Fifth Air Force, November 1943
- V Fighter Command, 25 July 1945
- XIII Bomber Command, 20 October – 28 November 1945
- 3d Air Support Operations Group, 1 July 1994 – present

=== Stations ===
- Mitchel Field, New York, 21 August 1942
- Morris Field, North Carolina, 7 November 1942
- Esler Field, Louisiana, 24 January 1943
- William Northern Field, Tennessee, c. 2 April 1943
- Lebanon Army Air Field, Tennessee, 8 April 1943
- Morris Field, North Carolina, 10 June – 22 October 1943
- Sydney, Australia, 21 November 1943
- Brisbane, Australia, 27 November 1943
- Nadzab, [Papua] New Guinea, 17 March 1944
- Clark Field, Luzon, Philippines, 1 April – 28 November 1945
- Fort Hood, Texas, 1 July 1994 – present
