= Weapon storage area =

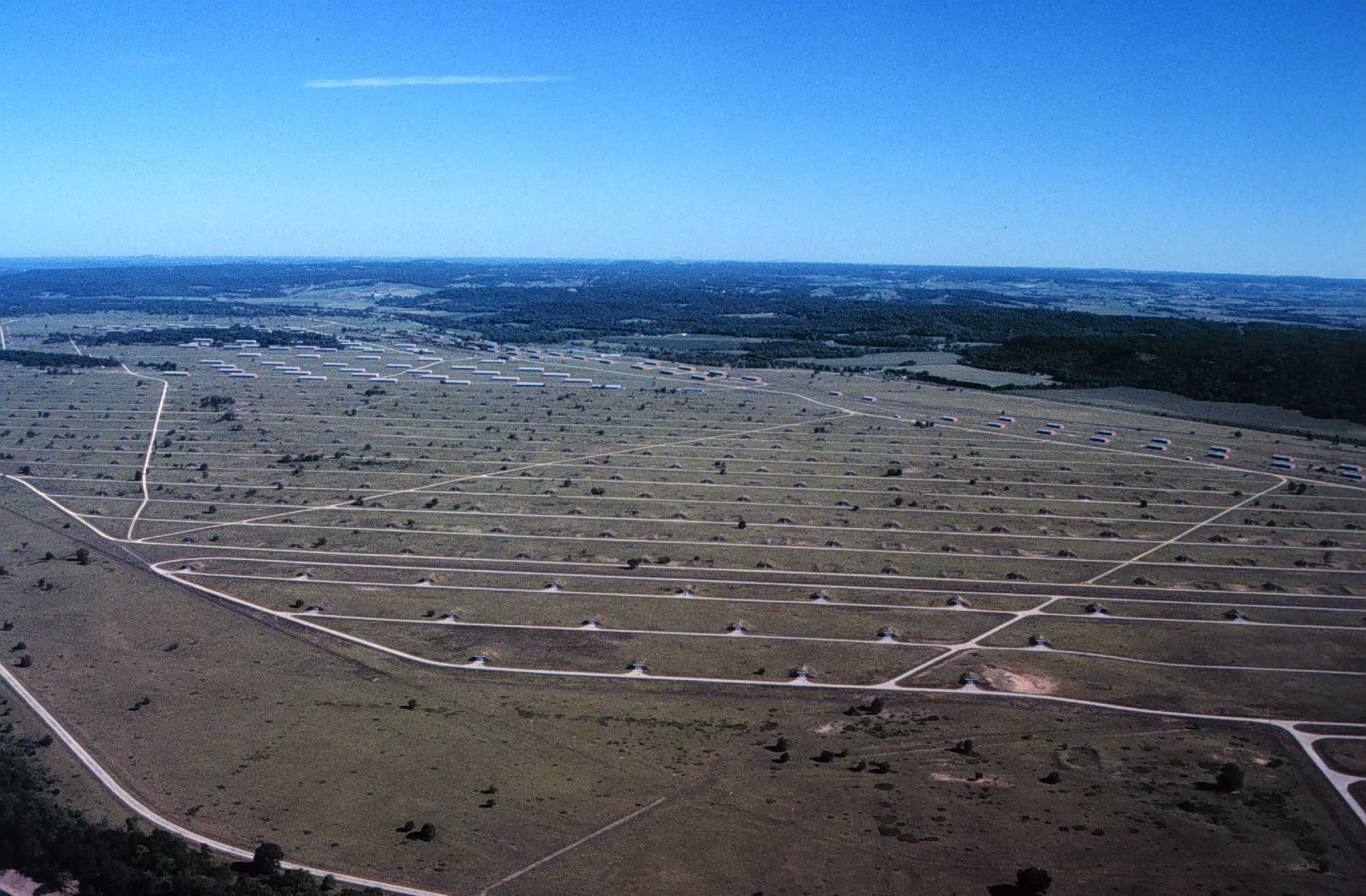
Typical WSA

Weapon storage areas (WSA), also known as special ammunition storage (SAS), were extremely well guarded and well defended locations where NATO nuclear weapons were stored during the Cold War era.

In most situations, the WSA or SAS areas were located inside the perimeter of an army barracks or an air base in NATO territory, but in a few cases they were located deep inside wooded areas and miles away from a military base.

Due to changes in the political landscape, the number of special weapons in Europe has been drastically decreased. Moreover, the introduction of the WS3 Weapon Storage and Security System has made WSAs obsolete.

At present, few WSAs are still operational as modern day special weapons are stored in the floors of concrete aircraft shelters and placed under 24/7 electronic surveillance.

== Examples ==
- Bossier Base
- Killeen Base
- Lake Mead Base, aka Nellis Area 2
- Manzano Base
- Medina Annex prior to NSA/CSS it was the Texas Cryptologic Center
- Naval Submarine Base Kings Bay
- Naval Base Kitsap, former Naval Submarine Base Bangor, Washington

== See also ==
- List of established military terms
- War reserve stock
- Supply depot
