= Joint Force Maritime Component Commander =

Officer that is responsible for maritime forces within a joint operations environment

Joint Force Maritime Component Command (JFMCC) (pronounced "Jiff-Mick"), is a United States Department of Defense doctrinal term.

The Joint Force Maritime Component Commander refers to an individual of flag officer that is responsible for maritime forces within a joint operations environment. The term "maritime forces" encompasses "blue water" forces (i.e. naval ships) and "brown water" forces (i.e. amphibious units).

As defined in Joint Doctrine Document 1-02, the JFMCC is:

"The commander within a unified command, subordinate unified command, or joint task force responsible to the establishing commander for making recommendations on the proper employment of assigned, attached, and/or made available for tasking maritime forces; planning and coordinating maritime operations; or accomplishing such operational missions as may be assigned. The joint force maritime component commander is given the authority necessary to accomplish missions and tasks assigned by the establishing commander."

== Confusion of term ==
While the position is usually held by a United States Navy officer in most joint warfighting environments, an officer of another service can be a JFMCC, if that service has the preponderance of maritime forces in theater and the means to command and control those forces (i.e. a Marine Corps unit commander).

== See also ==
- Air Operations Center (AOC)
- Joint Force Land Component Commander (JFLCC)
- Joint Force Air Component Commander (JFACC)
