= 20th Engineer Battalion =

20th Engineer Regiment 20th Engineer Battalion
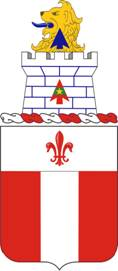
- 20th Engineers coat of arms
- Active: 1917–present
- Country: United States
- Branch: US Army Corps of Engineers
- Type: Combat Engineer
- Size: Battalion
- Part of: 36th Engineer Brigade
- Garrison/HQ: Fort Hood, Texas
- Nickname: Lumberjacks
- Mottos: Condite et Pugnate (Latin: Build and Fight!)
- Unit Identification: The wavy arrow
- Engagements: World War I World War II; Vietnam War; Persian Gulf; Iraq War; Afghanistan War
- Decorations: Presidential Unit Citation

Commanders
- Notable commanders: Col. James A. Woodruff

Insignia
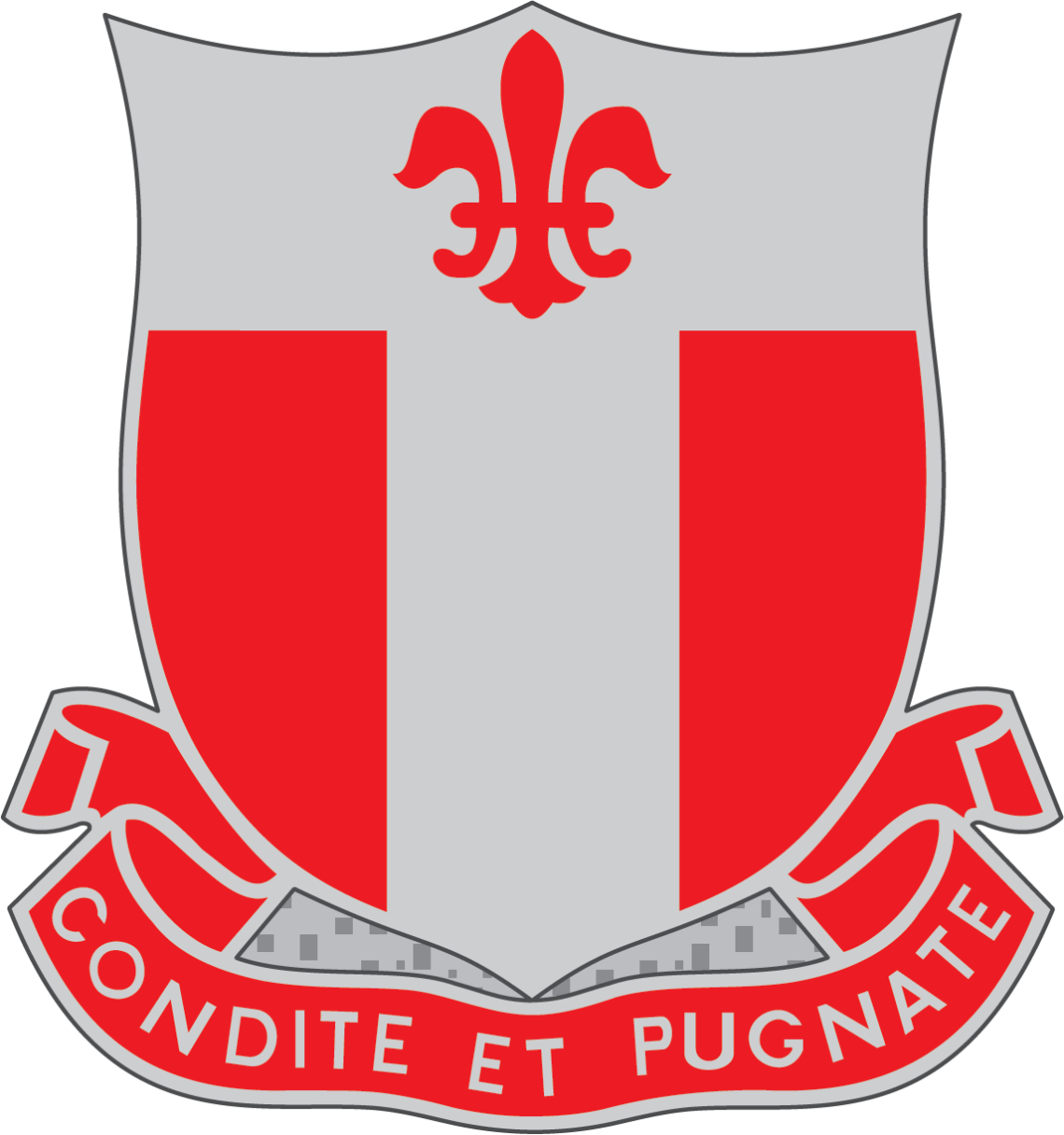
- Distinctive Unit Insignia

The 20th Engineer Battalion is a combat engineer battalion of the United States Army, headquartered at Fort Hood, Texas. It is assigned to the 36th Engineer Brigade and III Armored Corps. The battalion continues the lineage of the 20th Engineer Regiment.

The 20th Engineer Regiment was formed in 1917 as the United States prepared to enter World War I. It was established as a Forestry Regiment that grew to consist of 29 battalions and over 46,000 soldiers—the largest regiment in the history of the United States Army. It conducted forestry and ancillary operations throughout France, from the Spanish and Swiss borders to the very front lines in Ardennes.

The 20th Engineer Combat Regiment was activated in 1942 with two organic combat engineer battalions. After assault landings in Morocco and Sicily, the regiment was reorganized. The 1st Battalion, 20th Engineer Regiment was renamed the 20th Engineer Combat Battalion as it prepared for assault landings on Omaha Beach, for which it received a Presidential Unit Citation. The battalion fought across Normandy and northern France and then into Germany, with its final battles in Czechoslovakia.

The 20th Engineer Battalion (Combat) conducted operations throughout Vietnam from 1966 to 1971. It was part of the defense of Saudi Arabia and participated in the assault into Iraq in 1990-1991 during the Gulf War.

The 20th Engineers were deployed twice to Iraq and twice to Afghanistan as part of the war on terrorism.

== History ==
=== World War I ===
The 20th Engineer Regiment was organized with the mission to provide lumber for combat and support operations for the American Expeditionary Force and its allies, thereby earning the name "Lumberjacks". The US Forestry Service was largely in charge of recruiting for the regiment and was able to fill the first few battalions with men from within the Forestry Service and the civilian forestry industry.

In November 1917, the first two battalions of the 20th Engineer Regiment arrived in Saint-Nazaire, France. As additional battalions flowed to France, the 6th Battalion of the 20th Engineers suffered a major catastrophe as ninety-one soldiers of the battalion were killed when their ship, the SS Tuscania, was torpedoed by a German U-boat off the coast of Scotland.

The regiment had battalions stationed throughout France, in some places immediately behind the front lines, and in other places as far away as the mountains near the Spanish border. The 20th Engineer Regiment was demobilized upon returning to the United States in 1919 after it helped re-construct French infrastructure.

=== World War II ===
The 20th Engineer Regiment was reactivated in 1940 at Fort Benning, Georgia, as the United States prepared to enter World War II. In 1942 the 20th Engineer Regiment sailed to the French protectorate in Morocco where the 2nd Battalion carried out an assault landing on the beaches of Fedala. The regiment cleared and secured local ports and then fortified the hotel where President Franklin D. Roosevelt and Prime Minister Winston Churchill met for the Casablanca Conference.

The 20th Engineer Regiment marched across North Africa to join the command of General Omar Bradley and the II Corps in the French protectorate of Tunisia. There the regimental commander ordered the use of a directional marker, the Wavy Arrow, as a symbol for 20th Engineer equipment and signage; the Wavy Arrow has continued to be used by the 20th Engineers through current-day operations. In Tunisia, the regiment cleared thousands of mines that the Germans had planted throughout the country.

The 20th Engineer Regiment sailed from Tunisia with the 3rd Infantry Division on 6 July 1943. The regiment conducted a first wave assault landing on the beaches of Sicily and cleared lines of communication to complete the occupation of the island.

After the fall of Sicily the 20th Engineer Regiment sailed to Scotland and was reorganized. The regimental headquarters was redesignated as Headquarters of the 1171st Engineer Group; the 1st Battalion, 20th Engineer Regiment was designated the 20th Engineer Battalion; and the 2nd Battalion, 20th Engineer Regiment was designated as the 1340th Engineer Battalion (now the 54th Engineer Battalion). The reorganized units then moved to England to prepare for the invasion of Normandy.

On D-Day the 20th Engineers landed in the assault echelon of the 16th Infantry Regiment, 1st Infantry Division, on Omaha Beach for which it was awarded the Presidential Unit Citation and the French Croix de Guerre. The battalion went on to fight across France, Belgium, and Germany in engagements such as the Battle of Hürtgen Forest and the Battle of the Bulge, and ended the war in Czechoslovakia. The 20th Engineer Battalion was preparing to travel to Asia to carry out an attack on the Japanese home islands when the war finally ended.

The battalion was inactivated in Frankfurt, Germany on 30 March 1946.

=== The Cold War ===
The 20th Engineer Combat Battalion was reactivated on 18 September 1950, at Fort Bragg, North Carolina. In 1956, it was transferred to Fort Devens, Massachusetts. In the wake of the Berlin Crisis, the 20th Engineer Battalion was deployed to Germany in 1961, with Company A stationed in Berlin to reinforce the Berlin Brigade. The battalion returned to Fort Devens, Massachusetts in 1963.

=== Vietnam War ===
The 20th Engineer Battalion was transported to Cam Ranh Bay, Vietnam in 1966. The battalion was attached to the 18th Engineer Brigade for most of the war. With its organic and attached special companies, the battalion constructed airfields and basecamps, conducted land clearing and route clearance operations, built roads and bridges, and supported Special Forces operations.

On 20 August 1971, the 20th Engineer Battalion returned to the United States, to Fort Campbell, Kentucky.

=== Desert Shield and Desert Storm ===
The 20th Engineer Battalion deployed to Saudi Arabia for Operation Desert Shield in October 1990. It conducted counter mobility and survivability operations for the 101st Airborne Division and XVIII Airborne Corps Artillery.

In Operation Desert Storm, the battalion attacked 300 miles into Iraq with the mission to support the 3rd Armored Cavalry Regiment and French 1st Armored Division to secure the far western flank of the assault (the "big left hook"). During the attack, the 20th Engineers assaulted enemy fortifications, cleared areas of obstacles and unexploded ordnance, and built logistics bases. The battalion returned to Fort Campbell in April 1991.

=== Early 1990s reorganization ===
The 20th Engineers moved to Fort Hood to reorganize in June 1992 and became an organic part of the Engineer Brigade of the 1st Cavalry Division. The battalion was deployed as the core of a task force to the Boise National Forest, Idaho to fight forest fires in August 1994.

=== Korea ===
In 1995 he 20th Engineer Battalion headquarters and Company C were deployed in support of the 1st Brigade of the 1st Cavalry Division and 2-8 Cavalry to the mountains of Korea to participate in Operation Foal Eagle. The task force participated in simulated war games and reconnoitered key Korean infrastructure.

=== Kuwait ===
In February 1997, Company C along with the divisional cavalry squadron, was deployed to Kuwait on a mission to deter Iraqi aggression.

=== Bosnia and Herzegovina ===
The 20th Engineer Battalion was deployed to Bosnia and Herzegovina as part of the NATO mission to conduct peacekeeping operations for Operation Joint Forge. It participated in civil infrastructure reconstruction and de-mining projects, and contributed to maintaining social order. The battalion worked with both NATO and non-NATO allied forces in operations such as bridge construction, route reconnaissance, and general mobility operations.

=== Iraq War ===
In 2004, the 20th Engineer Battalion was deployed to Iraq, first in support of the 1st Armored Division and later as a part of the 1st Cavalry Division. The battalion's area of operations was centered on the city of Baghdad. The 20th Engineers conducted combat patrols, helped re-construct civil infrastructure, and cleared areas of munitions. The unit returned to Fort Hood in 2004, where it was relieved from the 1st Cavalry Division.

The 20th Engineer Battalion was reorganized and assigned to the 36th Engineer Brigade in 2006. The battalion was transformed according to the Army's new concept of modularity: it consisted only of a multi-functional headquarters and a forward support company for combat service support. Separately numbered, specialized companies and detachments (sapper, route clearance, bridging, mobility augmentation, diving, etc.) were assigned to the battalion based on a specific mission.

In late 2006, the 20th Engineer Battalion was again deployed to Iraq in support of the 1st Cavalry Division. This time the battalion carried out the mission under the command of the 1169th Engineer Group (Alabama National Guard), which functioned as the Engineer headquarters for the 1st Cavalry Division. Major missions of the battalion included route clearance, combat construction, rapid construction of forwarding operating bases during the Surge, and anti-IED operations. The battalion returned to Fort Hood in November 2007.

On November 5, 2009, an Arab terrorist shot, wounded, and killed soldiers at Fort Hood as they prepared to deploy to Afghanistan. Four soldiers were killed and eleven soldiers were wounded from the 20th Engineer Battalion.

=== War in Afghanistan ===
The 20th Engineer Battalion was deployed to Afghanistan in 2010 as part of the International Security Assistance Force (ISAF), a component of the North Atlantic Treaty Organization (NATO). The battalion was responsible for clearing routes and areas of explosive devices, primarily in the provinces of Kandahar, Zabul, and Helmand. They were visited by the Chairman of the Joint Chiefs of Staff during their deployment. The battalion returned to Fort Hood in January 2011.

The 20th Engineer Battalion was redeployed to Afghanistan in October 2012 as a multi-functional task force for conducting combat missions, clearing routes, and participating in construction missions. Many and diverse engineer companies, including National Guard units from Massachusetts, Wisconsin, North Carolina, and Florida, and an active-duty company from Fort Campbell, Kentucky, were assigned to the task force. The task force spent a considerable amount of time training engineers of the Afghan National Army. The battalion returned to Fort Hood in July 2013. 2014-2019 the 20th EN BN deployed to Afghanistan, Romania, and the southern border mission.

=== Current and future ===
The 20th Engineers at Fort Hood train for major, near-peer land combat. Its companies have begun to receive modern equipment such as M2 Bradley Engineer Fighting Vehicles and M1150 Assault Breacher Vehicles.

== Decorations and awards ==
=== Campaign participation credit ===
Ribbon	Conflict	Streamer
	World War I	Streamer Without Inscription
	World War II	French Algeria-French protectorate in Morocco; French protectorate of Tunisia; Sicily (with Arrowhead); Normandy (with Arrowhead); Northern France; Rhineland; Ardennes-Alsace; Central Europe
	Vietnam War	Counteroffensive; Counteroffensive, Phase II; Counteroffensive, Phase III; Tet Counteroffensive; Counteroffensive, Phase IV; Counteroffensive, Phase V; Counteroffensive, Phase VI; Tet 69/Counteroffensive; Summer-Fall 1969; Winter-Spring 1970; Sanctuary Counteroffensive; Counteroffensive, Phase VII; Consolidation I
	Southwest Asia	Defense of Saudi Arabia; Liberation and Defense of Kuwait
	War on Terrorism – Iraq	Transition of Iraq; Iraqi Governance
	War on Terrorism – Afghanistan	Consolidation III

=== Unit decorations ===
The 20th Engineer Battalion's decorations are as follows.

Ribbon	Award	Streamer Embroidery
	Presidential Unit Citation (Army)	Normandy
	French Croix de Guerre with Silver-Gilt Star	Vierville-Colleville
	Meritorious Unit Commendation (Army)	Vietnam 1966-1967
	Meritorious Unit Commendation (Army)	Vietnam 1967-1968
	Meritorious Unit Commendation (Army)	Vietnam 1968-1969
	Republic of Vietnam Civil Action Honor Medal, First Class	Vietnam 1970-1971
	Meritorious Unit Commendation (Army)	Southwest Asia 1990-1991
	Meritorious Unit Commendation (Army)	Iraq 2006-2007
	Valorous Unit Award	Helmand and Kandahar Provinces 2010-2011
	Meritorious Unit Commendation (Army)	Afghanistan 2012-2013
	Meritorious Unit Commendation (Army)	Afghanistan 2018
	Valorous Unit Award	Baghdad

== Publications ==
Veterans of World War 2, the 20th Combat Engineer Association of World War II, published a newsletter, The Wavy Arrow, until 2013.

The 20th Engineer Battalion published their activities in Iraq in a monthly newsletter named Lumberjack Ledger.
