= Skylark Field =

- IATA: ILE; ICAO: KILE; FAA LID: ILE

Summary
- Airport type: Public
- Owner: City of Killeen
- Serves: Killeen, Texas
- Elevation AMSL: 848 ft / 258 m
- Coordinates: 31°05′09″N 097°41′11″W

Map
- Location of airport in Texas ILE (the United States)

Runways
Direction	Length		Surface
Direction	ft	m	Surface
1/19	5,495	1,675	Asphalt

Statistics (2010)
- Aircraft operations: 29,700
- Based aircraft: 55
- Source: Federal Aviation Administration

Skylark Field (IATA: ILE, ICAO: KILE, FAA LID: ILE) is a city-owned, public-use airport located three nautical miles (6 km) east of the central business district of Killeen, a city in Bell County, Texas, United States. It is included in the National Plan of Integrated Airport Systems for 2011–2015, which categorized it as a general aviation facility. It was formerly known as Killeen Municipal Airport.

The airport does not currently offer scheduled passenger service on commercial airlines. Atlantic Southeast Airlines, operating as Delta Connection, served this airport until August 2003, when it replaced its turboprop airplanes with regional jets which required a longer runway. In August 2004, the City of Killeen relocated the remaining airlines from Killeen Municipal Airport to new facilities at the Killeen-Fort Hood Regional Airport, which has a longer runway to accommodate larger jets and an expanded terminal to handle more passengers.

== Facilities and aircraft ==
Skylark Field covers an area of 180 acres (73 ha) at an elevation of 848 feet (258 m) above mean sea level. It has one runway designated 1/19 with an asphalt surface measuring 5,495 by 100 feet (1,675 x 30 m).

For the 12-month period ending August 20, 2010, the airport had 29,700 aircraft operations, an average of 81 per day: 87% general aviation and 13% military. At that time there were 55 aircraft based at this airport: 91% single-engine, 4% multi-engine, and 5% helicopter.

== See also ==
- List of airports in Texas
