= 36th Engineer Brigade =

Combat engineer brigade of the III Armored Corps, US Army

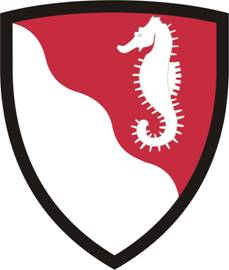
- 36th Engineer Brigade shoulder sleeve insignia
- Active: 1933–2026
- Country: United States
- Branch: United States Army
- Role: Combat engineering
- Size: Brigade
- Part of: III Armored Corps
- Garrison/HQ: Fort Hood, Texas
- Engagements: World War II; Korean War; Gulf War; Operation Iraqi Freedom; Operation Enduring Freedom
- Decorations: Meritorious Unit Commendation Five Awards; Korea 1953, Korea 1954, Southwest Asia 1990–1991; Republic of Korea Presidential Unit Citation (Korea 1950–1952), Iraq 2005–2006, Afghanistan 2007–2008

Insignia
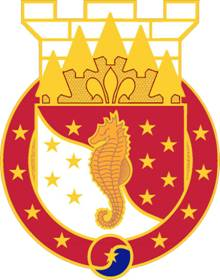
- Distinctive Unit Insignia

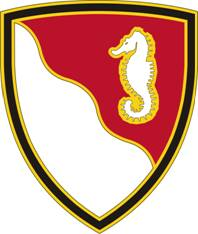
- Combat Service Identification Badge

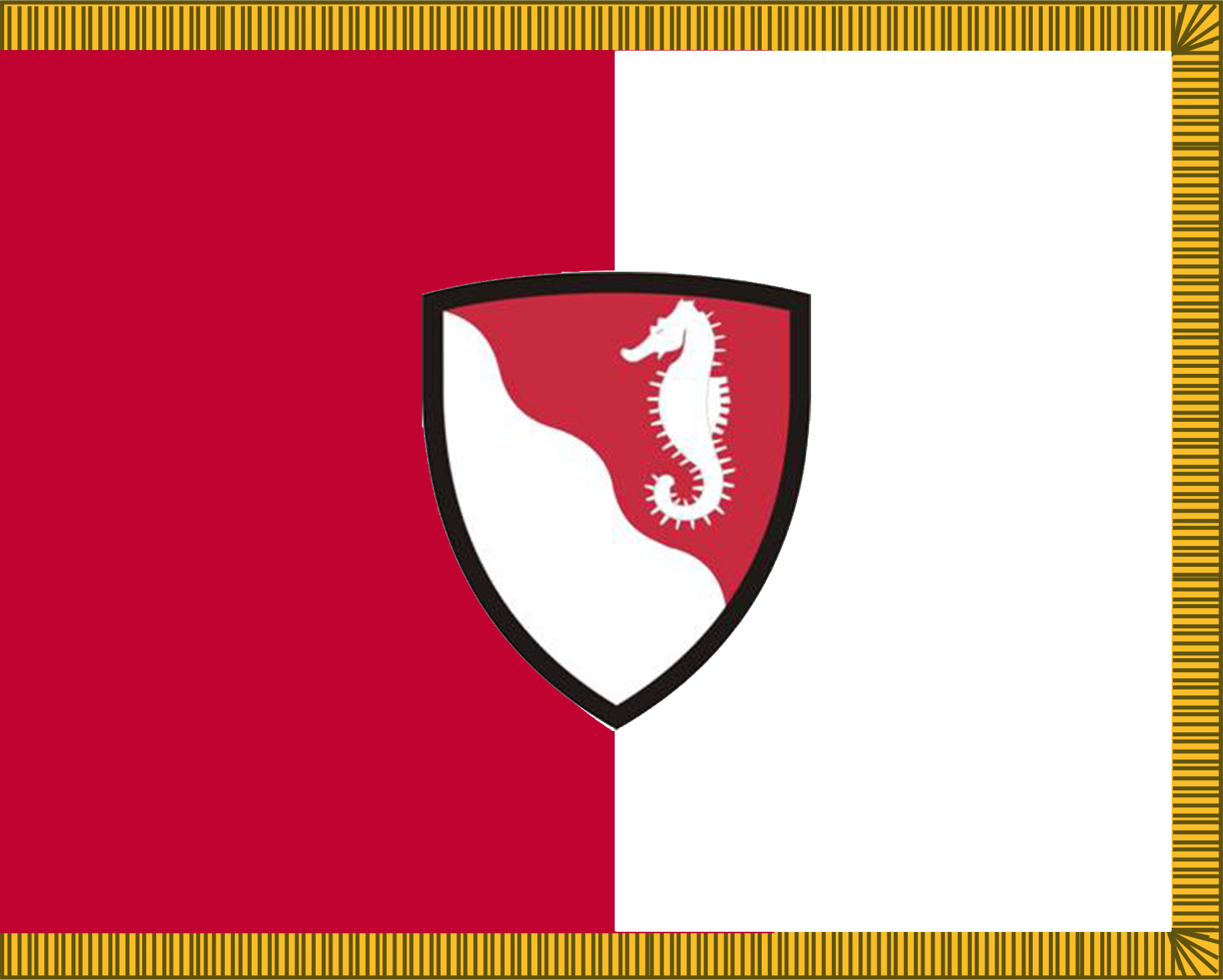
- 36th Engineer Brigade Flag

The 36th Engineer Brigade was a combat engineer brigade of the United States Army based at Fort Hood, Texas. The brigade was a subordinate unit of III Armored Corps. The 36th cased it colors on 22 October 2026 and its soldiers reassigned to the newly formed 1st Cavalry Division Engineer Brigade, 1st Cavalry Division

The unit was responsible for providing command and control to subordinate Engineer units. The unit was formerly designated as the 36th Engineer Group, and before that as the 36th Engineer Regiment. The 36th is the only unit that has been organized in all three command structures that are commanded by a Colonel in the U.S. Army; regiment, group, and brigade.

With a lineage that dates back to 1933, the 36th Engineer Brigade saw action in the North African Campaign and the Italian Campaign, and it eventually participated it the invasion of mainland Europe. Trained in amphibious assault, the brigade saw its role change several times, from combat engineers to front line infantry. It would later serve in the Korean War, earning several unit decorations. Recently, it has seen tours of duty in both Iraq and Afghanistan.

== Organization ==
The 36th Engineer Brigade was part of III Armored Corps, and consisted of a Headquarters and Headquarters Company, which is located at Fort Hood, Texas and three Engineer Battalions: 5th Engineer Battalion, 20th Engineer Battalion, and the 62nd Engineer Battalion.

The brigade was the first of the US Army's Engineer Brigades to be converted to a modular design. This means that the Brigade can be deployed and sustain itself independently, without a division or corps level command supporting it. Additionally, the brigade's design allows it to take command of additional units within a theater of operations, allowing for greater versatility on the battlefield.

== History ==
=== World War II ===
The 36th Engineer Brigade was originally constituted on 1 October 1933 as the 36th Engineer Regiment and activated on 1 June 1941 at Plattsburgh Barracks, New York. During World War II the 36th Engineer Regiment consisted of nine combat engineer companies trained for amphibious assault and support operations. Because of this training, the unit's distinctive insignia was designed with a seahorse on a red and white shield.

The brigade was deployed to the North African Campaign in 1942, participating in Operation Torch, where it conducted its first amphibious assault, and earning the brigade its first campaign streamer for the battle around Algeria and French Morocco. It would continue supporting Allied units as they pushed Axis forces out of North Africa during the Tunisia Campaign.

The brigade would then participate in the Battle of Sicily, conducting its second amphibious landing along with the 7th Army. It would push on with the rest of the force, eventually forcing German and Italian forces off of the island. The Brigade followed in the quick invasion of mainland Italy soon after, with an amphibious assault in the Naples-Foggia area, followed closely by another landing in support of Operation Shingle, near Anzio. For fifty days, during Operation Shingle, soldiers of the brigade held 7 miles (11 km) of the front line and earned the distinction by the German army as "The Little Seahorse Division".

The unit subsequently participated in the invasion of southern France in 1944, code named Operation Dragoon, conducting its fifth and final amphibious assault of the war. It would support Allied units through three additional campaigns up until the end of the war; the Rhineland Campaign, the Ardennes-Alsace Campaign, and the Central Europe Campaign.

=== Korean War ===
On 15 February 1945, the unit was redesignated as the 36th Engineer Combat Group, and following World War II it reorganized at Fort Lewis, Washington. The unit was broken up, its three battalions redesignated as the 2826th Combat Engineer Battalion, the 2827th Combat Engineer Battalion, and the 2828th Combat Engineer Battalion, respectively. They then assumed separate lineage, and the Regiment itself was inactivated on 30 November 1946 in Austria.

Reactivated on 5 May 1947 at Fort Lewis, Washington, the unit officially became the 36th Engineer Group on 10 April 1953. During the Korean War, the 36th Engineer Combat Group consisted of four engineer battalions and four additional engineer companies, earning two Meritorious Unit Citations and the Republic of Korea Presidential Unit Citation. It served in the Korean theater from 1950 until 1954, earning nine campaign streamers while supporting other army units in numerous engineering and construction projects, including rebuilding the Han river bridge just outside Seoul. During its assignment, the group was assigned to IX Corps of the Eighth United States Army. Projects that the group and its subordinate battalions completed included POW facilities, allied bases, and minefield clearing. Along with the rest of IX Corps, the group was forced back behind the Pusan Perimeter and remained stranded there until the Incheon Landings were conducted by X Corps. The group would follow IX Corps for the remainder of the Korean war.

After its withdrawal from Korea, the unit did not participate in any notable campaigns until its inactivation on 30 May 1972 at Fort Lewis. It was reactivated shortly after on 1 July 1973 as the 36th Engineer Group (Construction) at Fort Benning, Georgia. It would see no conflicts until the start of the Gulf War. In 1989, it participated in "Exercise Camino De La Paz," an unscheduled exercise conducted in the first half of 1989 on the Osa Peninsula of Costa Rica.

=== Present day ===
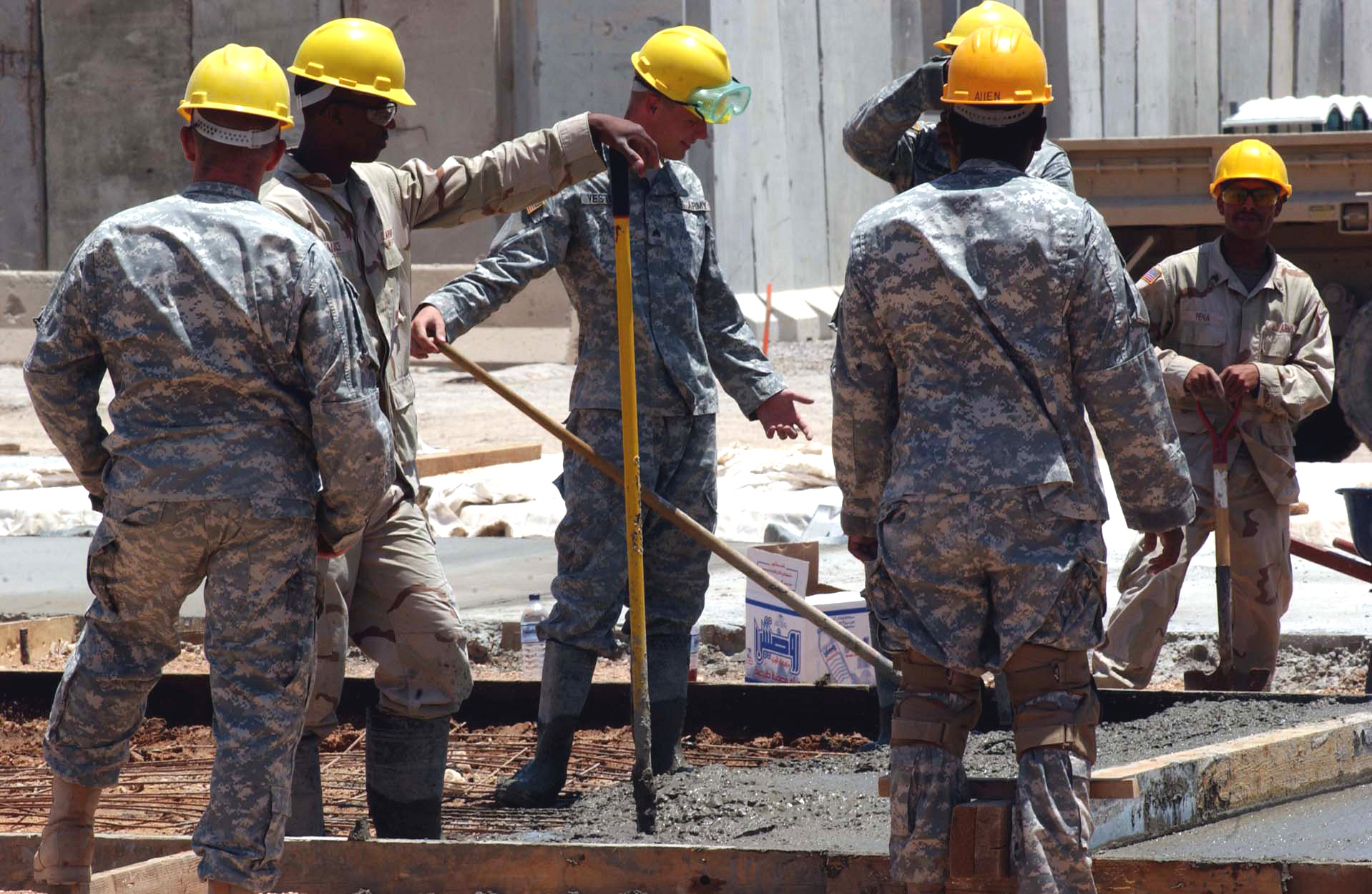
Soldiers from the 36th Engineer Brigade work on a construction project in Iraq.

During the 1991 Gulf War, the 36th Engineer Group (Construction) fought in support of the 24th Infantry Division's rapid attack to the Euphrates. The unit also deployed in support of peace enforcement missions during Operation Continue Hope in Somalia and Operation Uphold Democracy in Haiti. Most recently, the 36th Engineer Group (Construction) has twice deployed to Iraq in support of Operation Iraqi Freedom, executing a wide variety of construction missions in support of combat operations, including the construction of enemy prisoner of war camps, theater convoy support centers, and soldier life support areas. Some of the soldiers from the unit were still in Iraq as late as October 2007.

On 16 June 2006, the unit was reorganized and redesignated the 36th Engineer Brigade. and reassigned to Fort Hood, Texas as the United States Army's first modular engineer brigade headquarters. The brigade deployed to Afghanistan in support of Operation Enduring Freedom in 2007, holding a ceremony at III Corps Headquarters, casing its unit colors in preparation for its deployment on 28 February 2007. The brigade supports operations conducted by the 82nd Airborne Division. It is part of Task Force Rugged, and among its duties are training Afghan citizens in skilled labor and other nationbuilding operations. Most of the brigade served in Afghanistan since February 2007, while other elements of the unit served in Iraq. While in Afghanistan, the brigade headquarters were stationed at Forward Operating Base Sharana. It also began to undertake missions against Improvised Explosive Devices, a problem which had originated in Iraq but since became more of a threat in Afghanistan.

== Honors ==
=== Unit decorations ===
Ribbon	Award	Year	Notes
	Republic of Korea Presidential Unit Citation	1950–1952	for service in Korea
	Meritorious Unit Commendation (Army)	1953	for service in Korea
	Meritorious Unit Commendation (Army)	1954	for service in Korea
	Meritorious Unit Commendation (Army)	1990–1991	for service in Southwest Asia
	Meritorious Unit Commendation (Army)	2005–2006	for service in Iraq
	Meritorious Unit Commendation (Army)	2007–2008	for service in Afghanistan
	Meritorious Unit Commendation (Army)	2010–2011	for service in Iraq

=== Campaign streamers ===
Conflict	Streamer	Year(s)
World War II	Algeria-French Morocco (with Arrowhead)	1942
World War II	Tunisia	1942–1943
World War II	Sicily (with Arrowhead)	1943
World War II	Naples-Foggia (with Arrowhead)	1943
World War II	Anzio (with Arrowhead)	1943
World War II	Rome-Arno	1944
World War II	Southern France (with Arrowhead)	1944
World War II	Rhineland	1944–1945
World War II	Ardennes-Alsace	1944–1945
World War II	Central Europe	1945
Korean War	UN Offensive	1950
Korean War	CCF Intervention	1950
Korean War	First UN Counteroffensive	1950
Korean War	CCF Spring Offensive	1951
Korean War	UN Summer-Fall Offensive	1951
Korean War	Second Korean Winter	1951–1952
Korean War	Korea, Summer-Fall 1952	1952
Korean War	Third Korean Winter	1952–1953
Korean War	Korea, Summer 1953	1953
Gulf War	Defense of Saudi Arabia	1991
Gulf War	Liberation and Defense of Kuwait	1991
Operation Enduring Freedom	Afghanistan (CSES)	2002–2003
Operation Iraqi Freedom	Iraq	2006–2007
Operation Enduring Freedom	Afghanistan	2007–2008
