= Killeen Regional Airport =

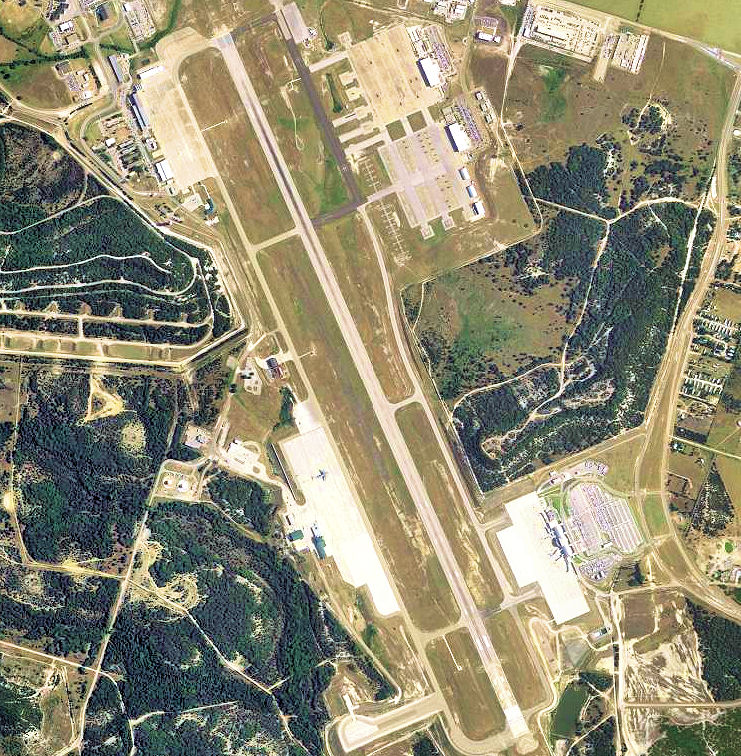
- USGS 2006 orthophoto
- IATA: GRK; ICAO: KGRK; FAA LID: GRK

Summary
- Airport type: Military/Public
- Location: Fort Hood / Killeen, Texas
- Elevation AMSL: 1,015 ft (309 m)
- Coordinates: 31°04′02″N 097°49′44″W
- Website: FlyGRK.net

Map
- Location of airport in Texas GRK (the United States)

Runways
| Direction | Length | | Surface |
| Direction | ft | m | Surface |
|---|---|---|---|
| 15/33 | 9,997 | 3,047 | PEM |

Statistics (2021)
- Aircraft operations (year ending 4/30/2021): 84,630
- Sources: Airport website and FAA

Killeen Regional Airport (IATA: GRK, ICAO: KGRK, FAA LID: GRK) is a small military/commercial joint-use airport that operates alongside Robert Gray Army Airfield. The airport is based inside the south end of the Fort Hood Military Reservation (known as West Fort Hood), six nautical miles (7 mi, 11 km) southwest of the central business district of Killeen, Texas, in unincorporated Bell County. The commercial side replaced the old Killeen Municipal Airport (now Skylark Field) in August, 2004 as that airport was unable to expand. Formerly Killeen–Fort Hood Regional Airport, on 26 September, 2023, the airport began the multi-month process of renaming to "Killeen Regional Airport", as approved by the Killeen City Council.

As per Federal Aviation Administration records, the airport had 232,299 passenger boardings (enplanements) in calendar year 2008, 231,500 enplanements in 2009, and 243,861 in 2010. It is included in the National Plan of Integrated Airport Systems for 2011–2015, which categorized it as a primary commercial service airport (more than 10,000 enplanements per year).

== Facilities and aircraft ==
The airport has one runway designated 15/33 with a PEM (Porous European Mix) surface measuring 9,997 by 200 feet (3,047 x 61 m). For the 12-month period ending April 30, 2021, the airport had 84,630 aircraft operations, an average of 232 per day: 87% military, 12% scheduled commercial and 1% general aviation. 47 aircraft were then based at this airport: 1 multi-engine, 6 jet, and 40 military.

The civilian terminal has six gates, car rental facilities, and retail shops. Gates 1-3 and 4-6 are separated by different TSA checkpoints.

=== 2018 Master Plan and Improvements ===
In 2018, the facility continued completion of the master plan, bid and awarded a $4.9 million passenger boarding bridge replacement project, design and bid a $4.7 million security surveillance project, completed design of a $750,000 quick-turn. facility and more. The airport also saw Blimpie take lease of one of the retail spots located on the second floor of the terminal in 2019.

== Airlines and destinations ==
Killeen Regional Airport currently offers a single non-stop destination.

At the time of the move from Skylark Field in August, 2004, American Eagle began flights to Dallas/Fort Worth International Airport, and Continental Express began flights to Houston George Bush Intercontinental Airport. Continental Express was merged into United Express in 2012 and the carrier ended service to Killeen in early 2022. Delta Connection provided service to Hartsfield-Jackson Atlanta International Airport from 2006 through early 2018.

In 2005, Allegiant Air offered twice weekly service to Las Vegas. After nine months of service, Allegient Air stopped all flights to and from Killeen in February 2006.

Occasionally, NCAA football teams have their charter airplanes parked at gates 1 and 6 for away football teams playing the University of Mary Hardin–Baylor, or for the university's own football team. The usual airlines for these charters include Sun Country, Xtra Airways, and Southwest Airlines.

On November 27, 2017, Delta Air Lines announced that service would no longer continue to Killeen, and the route ended on 15 January, 2018. American Airlines later added two daily flights because it no longer had competition with Delta, and it also added the Embraer 175, the largest aircraft for regular scheduled passenger flights currently, and the largest the airport has seen since Allegiant left. United Airlines also added a third daily flight in response to Delta leaving.

Effective 4 January, 2022, United ceased its operations in Killeen after announcing their plans on 4 November, 2021. American Airlines is the only remaining commercial passenger airline, with multiple flights to and from Dallas-Fort Worth International Airport daily under their American Eagle regional flight brand.

=== Passenger ===
| Airlines | Destinations |
|---|---|
| American Eagle | Dallas/Fort Worth |

Destination Map
Destination from Killeen-Fort Hood Regional Airport

=== Top destinations ===
Busiest domestic routes from GRK (January 2019–December 2019)
| Rank | City | Passengers |
|---|---|---|
| 1 | Dallas/Fort Worth, Texas | 108,000 |
| 2 | Houston (Intercontinental), Texas | 35,000 |

== Accidents near GRK ==
- On March 12, 1985, a USAF Lockheed C-130 Hercules crashed in Fort Hood when dropping 15-pound sand bags from low altitude to simulate a supply dropping mission. The aircraft stalled and crashed into a rural field. Six out of the 8 occupants were killed.

== See also ==
- List of airports in Texas
