= Yoakum–DeFrenn Army Heliport =

- IATA: HLR; ICAO: KHLR; FAA LID: HLR

Summary
- Airport type: Military
- Owner/Operator: U.S. Army
- Location: Fort Hood, Texas, U.S.
- Time zone: CST (UTC−6)
  - Summer (DST): CDT (UTC−5)
- Elevation AMSL: 924 ft / 282 m
- Coordinates: 31°08′19″N 097°42′52″W

Maps
- FAA airport diagram of Yoakum–DeFrenn Army Heliport as of June 2023
- Location of Yoakum–DeFrenn Army Heliport in Texas

Runways
Direction	Length		Surface
Direction	ft	m	Surface
16	3,701^{a}	1,128	Asphalt
34	3,701	1,128	Asphalt
- ^{a} Runway available for landing on Runway 16 is 3134 feet due to displaced threshold

Yoakum–DeFrenn Army Heliport (IATA: HLR, ICAO: KHLR, FAA LID: HLR) is a military airport located at the U.S. Army's Fort Hood, in Killeen, Texas, U.S. Formerly Hood Army Airfield, the airport was renamed on 4 May 2023 in honor of Keith Yoakum and Jason DeFrenn.

== Facilities ==
Yoakum–DeFrenn Army Heliport has a single 3,701-by-144-foot (1,128 m × 44 m) asphalt runway, identified as 16/34. In the 16 direction, the threshold is displaced by 567 feet (173 m), resulting in a usable length for landing of 3,134 feet (955 m).

The base is also served by Robert Gray Army Airfield (IATA: GRK, ICAO: KGRK, FAA LID: GRK) and two asphalt auxiliary landing strips used for training at North Fort Hood:

- Shorthorn Aux Landing Strip (FAA LID: 23XS) – 2,130 by 46 feet (649 m × 14 m) (RWY 15 1,583 feet (482 m) usable, RWY 33 1,897 feet (578 m) usable) at 31.361°N 97.673°W, elevation 720 feet (220 m), magnetic variation 5.1° E
- Longhorn Aux Landing Strip (FAA LID: 22XS) – 3,490 by 75 feet (1,064 m × 23 m) (unmarked numbers, but same magnetic heading as Shorthorn at 153 degrees) at 31.374°N 97.667°W, elevation 720 feet (220 m), magnetic variation 5.1° E
