= Robert Gray Army Airfield =

Robert Gray Army Airfield Robert Gray Air Force Base
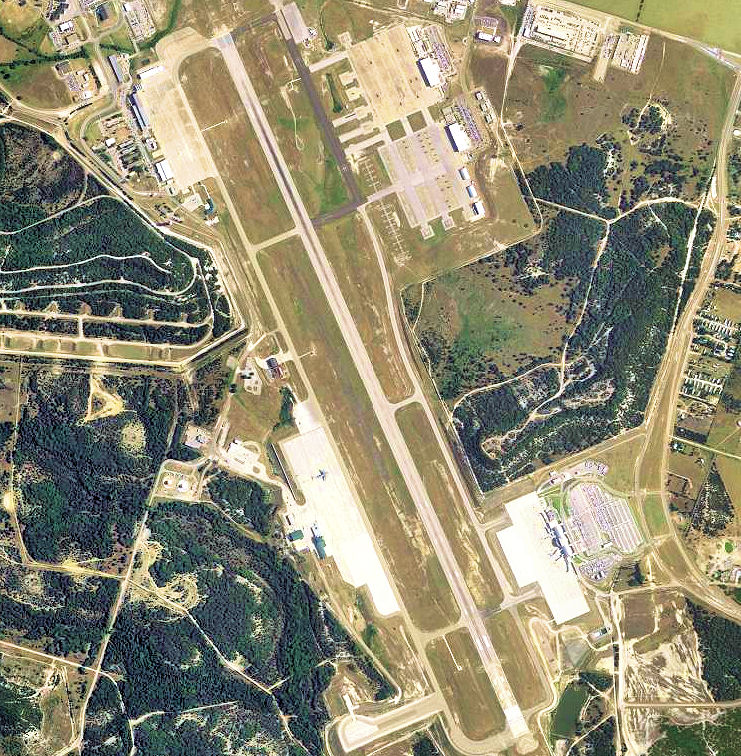
- USGS 2006 orthophoto
- IATA: GRK; ICAO: KGRK; FAA LID: GRK

Summary
- Airport type: Public / Military
- Owner: U.S. Army ATCA-ASO
- Location: Fort Hood / Killeen, Texas
- Elevation AMSL: 1,015 ft / 309 m
- Coordinates: 31°04′02″N 097°49′44″W

Map
- Location of airport in Texas

Runways
Direction	Length		Surface
Direction	ft	m	Surface
15/33	10,000	3,048	PEM

Statistics (2010)
- Aircraft operations: 12,208
- Sources: Airport website and FAA

Robert Gray Army Airfield (IATA: GRK, ICAO: KGRK, FAA LID: GRK) is a military joint-use airport that operates alongside Killeen Regional Airport. The airport is based inside the south end of the Fort Hood Military Reservation (West Fort Hood), six nautical miles (7 mi, 11 km) southwest of the central business district of Killeen, Texas, in unincorporated Bell County.

As per Federal Aviation Administration records, the airport had 232,299 passenger boardings (enplanements) in calendar year 2008, 231,500 enplanements in 2009, and 243,861 in 2010. It is included in the National Plan of Integrated Airport Systems for 2011–2015, which categorized it as a primary commercial service airport (more than 10,000 enplanements per year).

== History ==
The base was named after Killeen native Robert M. Gray who was a pilot of a B-25 bomber on the famous Doolittle Raid on Tokyo in 1942. He was killed later in World War II flying combat missions.

== Facilities and aircraft ==
The airport has one runway designated 15/33 with a PEM (Porous European Mix) surface measuring 10,000 by 200 feet (3,048 x 61 m). For the 12-month period ending April 10, 2010, the airport had 12,208 aircraft operations, an average of 33 per day: 98.5% scheduled commercial and 1.5% general aviation.

The base is also served by Yoakum–DeFrenn Army Heliport (IATA: HLR, ICAO: KHLR, FAA LID: HLR) and two asphalt auxiliary landing strips used for training at North Fort Hood:

- Shorthorn Aux Landing Strip (FAA LID: 23XS) – 2,130 by 46 feet (649 m × 14 m) (RWY 15 1,583 feet (482 m) usable, RWY 33 1,897 feet (578 m) usable) at 31.361°N 97.673°W, elevation 720 feet (220 m), magnetic variation 5.1° E
- Longhorn Aux Landing Strip (FAA LID: 22XS) – 3,490 by 75 feet (1,064 m × 23 m) (unmarked numbers, but same magnetic heading as Shorthorn at 153 degrees) at 31.374°N 97.667°W, elevation 720 feet (220 m), magnetic variation 5.1° E

== See also ==
- Texas World War II Army Airfields
- List of airports in Texas

== Other sources ==
- Freeman, Paul (2008) Abandoned & Little-Known Airfields: Texas
- Maurer, Maurer (1983). Air Force Combat Units Of World War II. Maxwell AFB, Alabama: Office of Air Force History. ISBN 0-89201-092-4.
- Ravenstein, Charles A. (1984). Air Force Combat Wings Lineage and Honors Histories 1947–1977. Maxwell AFB, Alabama: Office of Air Force History. ISBN 0-912799-12-9.
- Thole, Lou (1999), Forgotten Fields of America : World War II Bases and Training, Then and Now - Vol. 2. Publisher: Pictorial Histories Pub, ISBN 1-57510-051-7
