= West Fort Hood =

Weapons storage area adjacent to Fort Hood, Texas

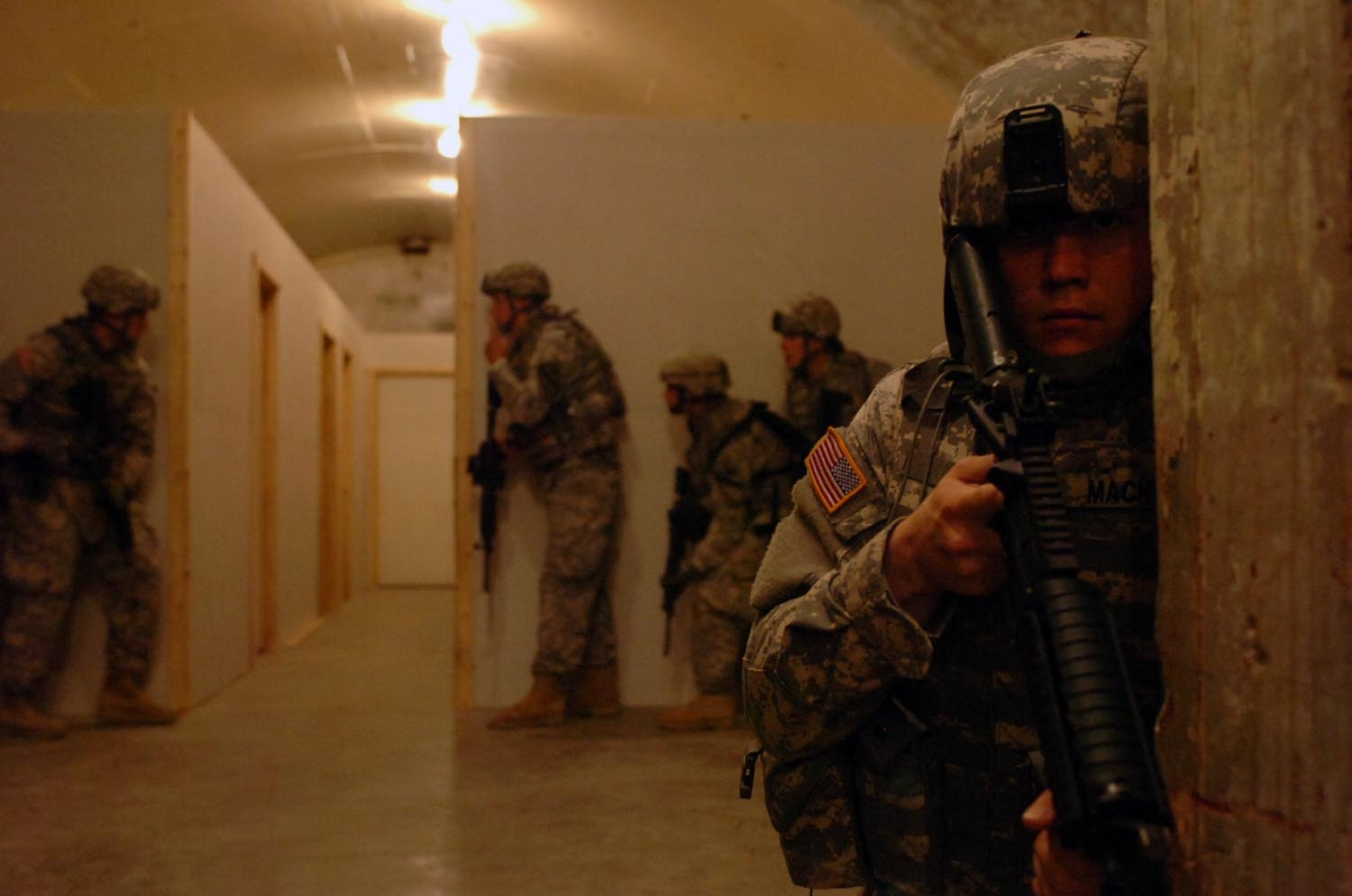
3rd Combined Arms Battalion conducting subterranean training in West Fort Hood, 2008

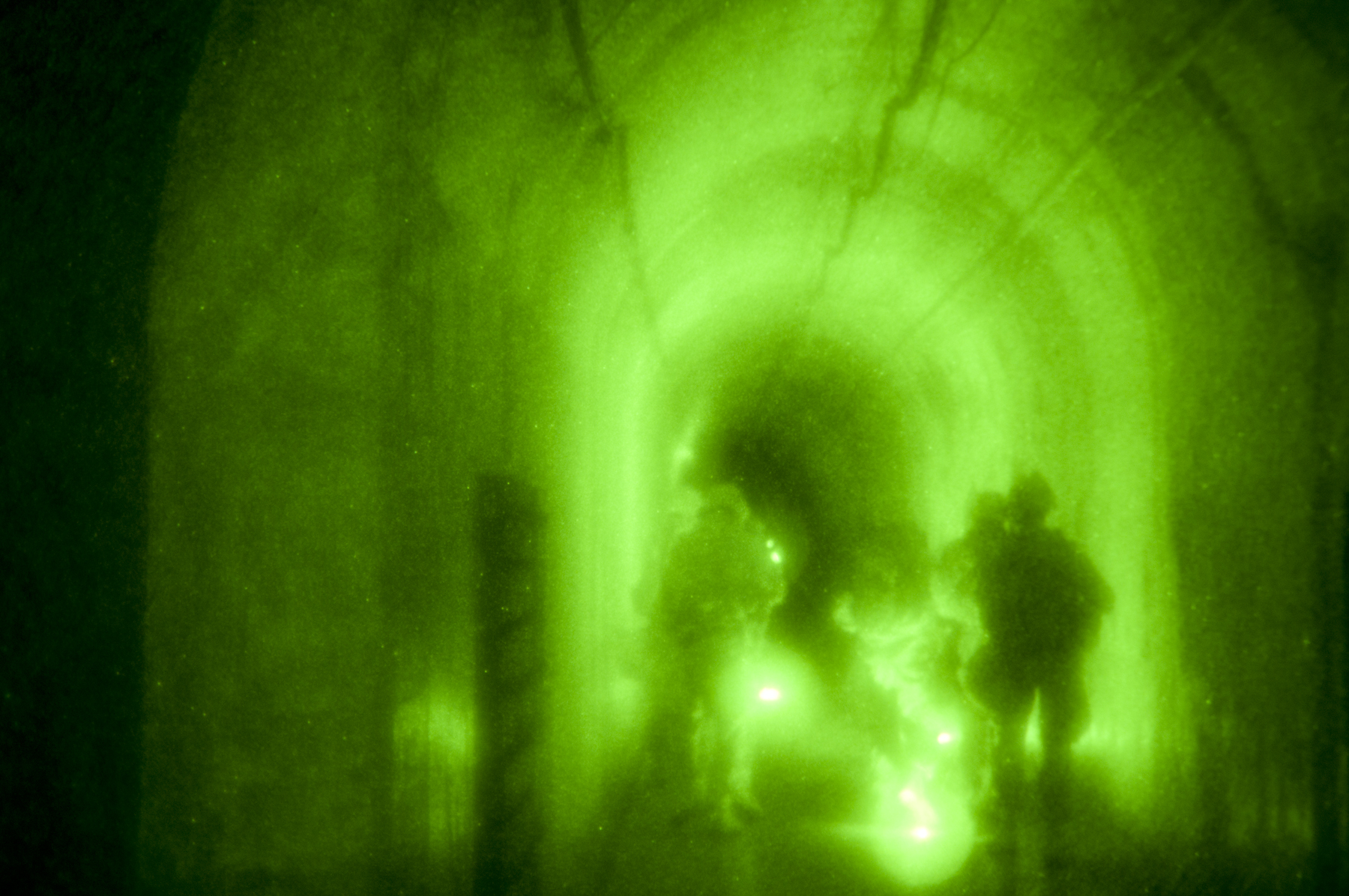
Night vision photograph of subterranean training in West Fort Hood, 2014

West Fort Hood, is an underground weapons storage area adjacent to Fort Hood in Texas. Originally built in the late 1940s by the United States Air Force, it was adjacent to Gray Air Force Base. On 15 June 1963 Killeen Base was turned over to the Army, and in October 1969, Killeen Base was designated as West Fort Hood and the airfield's name was designated as Robert Gray Army Airfield. It is also home to the Army Operational Test Command.

The tunnel corridors are each 20 feet wide with 30 foot ceilings that penetrate to a depth of 80 plus feet below the mountain top, with 2-foot-thick concrete walls dug nearly 1,000 feet into the hillside.

Interspersed throughout the complex are rooms of various sizes that are still equipped with steel rails for overhead cranes.

The complex is now used for tunnel warfare training by various units stationed at Fort Hood including the Ironhawk Troop in the Third Cavalry Regiment
