= Fort Hood =

US Army post near Killeen, Texas

- eponym: Col. Robert B. Hood
- Killeen, Texas
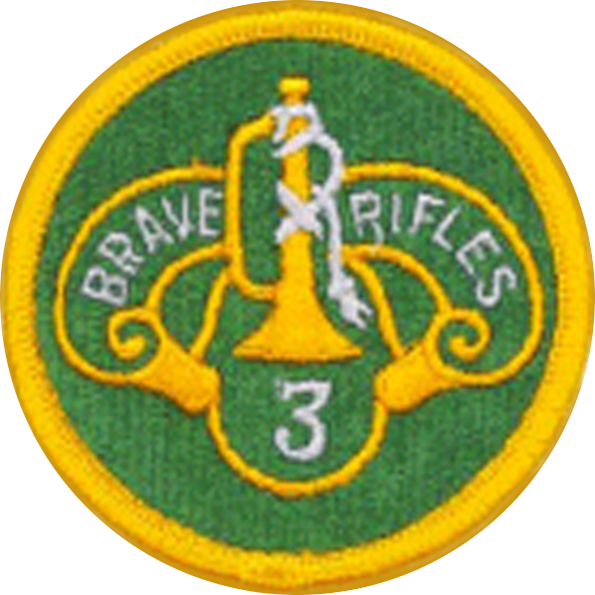
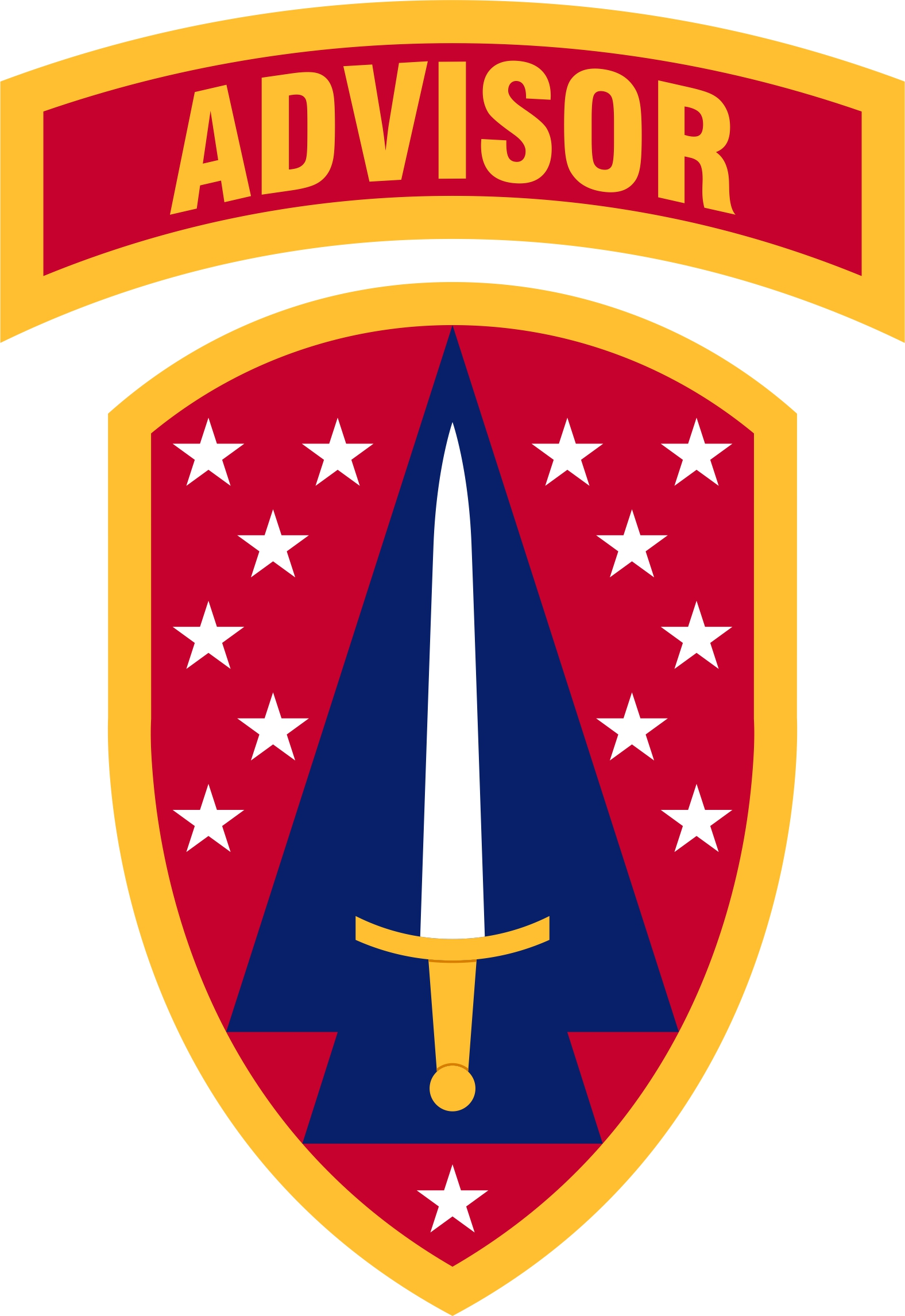
- Shoulder sleeve insignia of major Ft. Hood units

Site information
- Type: Army post
- Owner: Department of the Army
- Controlled by: United States Army
- Status: Active
- Website: Official website

Location
- Coordinates: 31°08′23″N 97°45′57″W
- Area: 332.05 sq mi (860 sq km)

Site history
- Built: 1942
- In use: 1942–present

Garrison information
- Current commander: LTG Kevin Admiral
- Garrison: III Armored Corps; First Army Division West; 1st Cavalry Division; 36th Engineer Brigade; 13th Sustainment Command; 3rd Cavalry Regiment; 116th Military Intelligence Brigade; 504th Military Intelligence Brigade; 89th Military Police Brigade; 1st Medical Brigade; Operational Test Command; 407th Army Field Support Brigade; 48th Chemical Brigade; 69th Air Defense Artillery Brigade; 11th Signal Brigade; 3rd Security Force Assistance Brigade; 9th Air Support Operations Squadron

Fort Hood is a United States Army post located near Killeen, Texas. The post is located halfway between Austin and Waco, about 60 mi (100 km) from each, within the U.S. state of Texas. The post is the headquarters of III Armored Corps and First Army Division West and is home to the 1st Cavalry Division and 3rd Cavalry Regiment, among others.

The post was originally named after Confederate General John Bell Hood, commander of the Texas Brigade during the American Civil War. In 2023 it was renamed Fort Cavazos for Gen. Richard E. Cavazos, a native Texan and the US Army's first Hispanic four-star general. In 2025, it was renamed back to Fort Hood, after Col. Robert Hood.

Its origin was the need for wide-open space to test and train with World War II tank destroyers. The War Department announced the location in January 1942, and the initial completion was set for that August. As originally constructed, Fort Hood had an area of 158,706 acres (64,226 ha), with billeting for 6,007 officers and 82,610 enlisted personnel. The main cantonment of Fort Hood had a total population of 53,416 as of the 2010 U.S. Census. Fort Hood was the most populous U.S. military installation in the world. The main business area is in Bell County, with the training countryside area of the post in Coryell County. In April 2014, the base's website listed 45,414 assigned soldiers and 8,900 civilian employees covering an area of 214,000 acres (87,000 ha).

== History ==
=== Foundation ===
During World War II, tank destroyers were developed to counter German mobile armored units. These were mobile antitank guns on armored halftracks or specially developed tanks. Wide-open space was needed for the tank destroyer testing and training, which Texas had in abundance. Andrew Davis (A.D.) Bruce was assigned to organize a new Tank Destroyer Tactical and Firing Center, and he chose Killeen, Texas, for the new camp. The War Department announced the selection on 15 January 1942. An initial acquisition of 180,000 acres (730 km^{2}) was made, and the camp was estimated to cost $22.8 million for the land, facilities, and development of utilities. The date of completion was set for 15 August 1942.

About 300 families had to move from their homes to make room for the camp area and the communities of Clear Creek, Elijah, and Antelope were demolished to facilitate construction of the base. The old Sugar Loaf community, historically called the "Cradle of Killeen", provided the city with many of its first citizens in 1882. All that remains of the community is the mountain from which it took its name, located in the Fort Hood area. To lessen the burden of moving, the Army agreed to allow land to be used for grazing for a nominal grazing fee. This grazing arrangement still continues today.

In mid-August, the camp was occupied and the official opening took place on 18 September 1942. Camp Hood was named in February for Confederate General John Bell Hood, who commanded Hood's Texas Brigade during the American Civil War, part of a series of new training camps named for notable regional military leaders together with Camps Carson, Campbell, and Atterbury.

The original facilities provided housing and training sites for nearly 38,000 troops. In January 1943, an additional 16,000 acres (65 km^{2}) in Bell County and 34,943 acres (141.41 km^{2}) in Coryell County near Gatesville, Texas were purchased. The site near Gatesville was known as the subcamp and later as North Camp Hood. During the war years, North Camp Hood housed nearly 40,000 troops and 4,000 prisoners of war and was the site for the southern branch of the United States Disciplinary Barracks.

At the end of 1942, about 45,000 troops were living and training at Camp Hood, and in late June 1943, the population peaked at almost 95,000 troops, which was maintained until early 1944.

In 1944, the number of tank destroyer battalions in training at the post declined rapidly. Field artillery battalions and the Infantry Replacement Training Center replaced them in March 1944. By September, the Infantry Center was the largest activity on post with 31,545 troops. The total camp population on the last day of 1944 was 50,228.

During the last year of World War II, the post's mission shifted and its population drastically decreased. As the war came to an end, troop training slowed and equipment reclamation and demobilization were prioritized. A separation center was established in September 1945, and as the year ended, post strength had fallen to 1,807 prisoners and about 11,000 troops. The Infantry Replacement Training Center was officially shut down on 7 January 1946.

=== Cold War ===
The 2nd and 20th Armored Divisions were sent to Camp Hood after returning from Europe in January 1946, but the 20th was soon inactivated, leaving fewer than 5,000 at the post. The 2nd Armored remained at the post until its inactivation at the end of the Cold War. Camp Hood was retained postwar as an armored training center and on 15 April 1950 was officially renamed Fort Hood as a result of its permanent status.

In mid-1954, III Corps moved from California to the post. The corps supervised the training of combat units at Fort Hood and other Fourth Army stations from 1954 to 1959 when III Corps was inactivated. Probably the most famous trainee to come through the post was Elvis Presley, arriving on 28 March 1958. Other than receiving record amounts of mail (three or four bags per day), he was treated like all other trainees. On 19 September, Presley shipped out for Germany. During this period, the 4th Armored Division was reactivated and deployed to Germany as part of the "Gyroscope" concept of unit movement.

In September 1961, Fort Hood again became the home for the III Corps, and in February 1962, III Corps was assigned as part of the U.S. Army Strategic Army Corps. At the same time, the basing of the 1st Armored Division there made it a two-division post. On 15 June 1963, Killeen Base was turned over to the Army.

=== Vietnam War ===
During the late 1960s, Fort Hood trained and deployed a number of units and individuals for duty in Vietnam. As the United States ended its role in the conflict, thousands of returning soldiers completed their active duty with one of the divisions. During this time, the post was modernized. On 13 September 1965, Darnall Hospital opened. In 1970, construction began on Palmer Theater and Venable Village was dedicated. Modern barracks were springing up around post. The wood buildings of the post were replaced with brick structures.

In August 1968, forty-three African American GIs, who objected to being sent to Chicago for riot-control duty during the 1968 Democratic National Convention, were court martialed and jailed by the US Army. Many of the soldiers were decorated and wounded veterans who had completed tours of duty in Vietnam.

In October 1969, Killeen Base was designated as West Fort Hood, and the airfield's name was designated as Robert Gray Army Airfield. The base was named after a Killeen native who was a pilot of a B-25 bomber on the famous Doolittle Raid in Tokyo in 1942. He was killed later in World War II flying combat missions. With the redesignation came a change in mission at West Fort Hood. Nuclear weapons were removed; they had been secretly kept there since 1947.

In 1971, the colors of the 1st Cavalry Division came to the post from Vietnam, resulting in the reflagging of the 1st Armored Division, the colors of which were sent to Germany to reflag the 4th Armored Division.

From 23 December 1972, to 19 January 1973, elements of the 13th Support Brigade deployed to the 1972 Nicaragua earthquake to assist in disaster relief serving at Camp Christine, Managua, Nicaragua.

=== Proving grounds ===
Since the early 1970s, the post has played a major role in the training, testing, and introduction of new equipment, tactics, and organizations. The U.S. Army Training and Doctrine Command's Test and Experimentation Command (now the U.S. Army Operational Test Command), located at West Fort Hood, has been a primary player. Fort Hood fielded the M1 Abrams tank, M2/3 Bradley Infantry/Cavalry Fighting Vehicle, the Multiple Launch Rocket System (MLRS), and the AH-64 Apache helicopter.

In January 1975, the 1st Cavalry Division was reorganized as the Army's newest armored division. Since fielding the M-1 Abrams in 1980, force modernization has continued as a major focus. The 1st Cavalry became the first division to field the AH-64 Apache attack helicopter, M2 Bradley Fighting Vehicle, the Humvee, the M270 MLRS, and Mobile Subscriber Equipment (MSE) tactical communications.

Beginning in 1984, the AH-64 Task Force was created at Fort Hood to train and equip pilots in the AH-64 Apache attack helicopter. In 1986, the unit became the Apache Training Brigade starting with eight Apache helicopters.

=== 1990–2000 Army deployments ===
In August 1990, the post was alerted for deployments to Southwest Asia as part of the joint forces participating in Operation Desert Shield. The deployment to Saudi Arabia began in September, extending into mid-October.

On 21 May 1991, with the reactivation of its 3rd Brigade ("Greywolf"), the 1st Cavalry Division became the largest division in the Army upon its return to the United States. In October 1992, the Engineer Brigade, 1st Cavalry Division was reactivated. Through the Engineer Restructuring Initiative, the nucleus of the brigade was formed around the 8th Engineer Battalion. The 20th Engineer Battalion was brought from Fort Campbell to join the brigade, and the 91st Engineer Battalion was activated to complete the brigade.

In November 1992, the unit designations for the battalions remaining from the former "Tiger" Brigade of the 2nd Armored Division were returned prior to the activation of the division at the post on 2 December 1992. This action was done to realign the historical designations of units to their parent divisions. On 29 November 1992, the 3rd Battalion, 41st Infantry was designated as the 1st Battalion, 9th Cavalry; 1st Battalion, 67th Armor to 3rd Battalion, 8th Cavalry, and 1st Battalion, 3rd Field Artillery to 2nd Battalion, 82nd Field Artillery. On 16 December 1992, 1st Cavalry Division units designated to accomplish realignments for historical purposes and included the 1st Battalion, 32nd Armor reflagged as 2nd Battalion, 12th Cavalry; 3rd Battalion, 32nd Armor to 1st Battalion, 12th Cavalry; and Battery A, 333rd Field Artillery to Battery B, 26th Field Artillery.

During the postwar periods called Operation Desert Calm and Operation Provide Comfort, post units continued to serve in the Persian Gulf area. From December 1992 to May 1993, post soldiers deployed to Somalia for Operation Restore Hope to command and control the Joint Task Force Support Command. In the fall of 1994, the post's units participated in the largest deployment since Operation Desert Shield and Desert Storm executed split base operations in the Caribbean Basin, Central America, and Southwest Asia, in support of Operations Vigilant Warrior and Sea Signal V, as well as other contingency operations.

13th Corps Support Command Commander Brig. Gen. Billy K. Solomon deployed along with a portion of the headquarters in December 1992 to Mogadishu to serve as the nucleus of Joint Task Force Support Command. Their major units included the 593rd Support Group (Fort Lewis), 36th Engineer Group (Fort Benning), 7th Transportation Group (Fort Eustis), and 62d Medical Group (Fort Lewis). The command headquarters returned to Fort Hood in May 1993.

As a result of the Base Realignment and Closure Commission reductions, the 5th Infantry Division (Mechanized), then located at Fort Polk Louisiana, was reflagged as the 2nd Armored Division in late 1992. By mid-1993, the division at Fort Hood had completed changes of unit names to those associated with the 5th Division and began participation in the early stages of the Army's experimental force, Force XXI.

In 1995, the 2nd Armored Division was reflagged as the U.S. 4th Infantry Division. Twenty-five years after making its home in Colorado, the 4th Infantry Division was again restationed to meet the Army's requirements, but this move was quite different from others. It became a split-based organization with six brigades and three separate battalions stationed at the post and the 3rd Brigade Combat Team remaining at Fort Carson. By December 1995, the 4th Infantry Division (Mechanized) assumed responsibility as the Army's Force XXI, and on 15 December 1995, its colors were unfurled for the first time over Central Texas and the post.

Since the 1990s, post units have supported Operation Joint Endeavor in Bosnia and Herzegovina. In October 1998, the 1st Cavalry Division was the first United States division to assume authority of the Multinational Division (North) area of operation in Bosnia-Herzegovina. The mission was to conduct operations to enforce the military provisions set forth by the Dayton Peace Accords.

In 1998, the Ironhorse Division was designated to be the Army's first multicomponent unit. The main objective being to enhance Total Force integration, optimize the unique capabilities of each component, and improve the overall readiness of the Army. The program was developed to leverage the strengths of the Army's three components (active, reserve, and National Guard). As such, 515 positions within the division have been designated as reserve component. These positions include individuals, a unit from the Wyoming National Guard, and dual-mission units from the Texas Army National Guard.

In addition to peacekeeping efforts, the post's units routinely participate in national and international disaster-relief efforts. Hours after the 1985 Mexico City earthquake, III Corps units were ready to move out to provide assistance. Fort Hood units also aided Managua, Nicaragua, after an earthquake ravaged the city.

During the 1990s, the post continued an extensive building program to modernize. This modernization continued with emphases on quality of life, force projection, and training. The Robertson Blood Center, Soldier Development Center, and a new commissary at Warrior Way have been completed. Many other improvements were made to improve the Power Projection Mission of the post such as improvements to the railhead and the runway at Gray Army Airfield. Training ranges have been upgraded.

=== 2000–2009 Army deployments ===
At the beginning of the 21st century, the Army's modernization was in full swing. Some of these new advances in technology and war fighting included the fielding of the M1A2 Abrams Main Battle Tank, the M2A2 Operation Desert Storm Bradley Infantry Fighting Vehicle, the M109A6 Paladin howitzer, the OH-58D Kiowa Warrior, the AH-64D Apache Longbow Helicopter, and the M6 Bradley Linebacker.

Fort Hood was the first installation selected to privatize post housing under the residential communities initiative, under which new housing units, remodeled housing, and community improvements were to be added to the post.

In 2001, the war on terror became a prime focus. The post transitioned from an open to a closed post with the help of military police from reserve units. The 1st Cavalry sent additional troops to Kuwait to protect against possible aggressive actions from Iraq. The 4003rd Garrison Support Reserve unit fills vacancies left by deploying units on post.

Many Fort Hood units were deployed to Afghanistan for Operation Enduring Freedom, and to Iraq for Operation Iraqi Freedom. In December 2003, the 4th Infantry Division captured Saddam Hussein. In the spring of 2004, the 1st Cavalry Division followed the 4th Infantry Division deploying to Iraq. Task Force ODIN was created at the post.

In September 2005, 13th COSCOM and key enablers were called to support Joint Task Force Katrina/Rita hurricane relief and went on to serve as the senior joint logistical support command for JTF Katrina. 13th COSCOM eventually provided 100 million rations, collected human remains with dignity, executed emergency engineering operations, transported, distributed, and stored over $1 billion in humanitarian relief from both nongovernmental and federal sources from across the nation.

In 2009, Fort Carson, Colorado's First Army Division West restationed to Fort Hood to consolidate its mission to conduct reserve component mobilization training and validation for deployment, switching places with 4th Infantry Division, which relocated to Fort Carson.

=== 2007 navigation exercise incident ===
On 12 June 2007, the body of Lawrence George Sprader, Jr, was found at about 8:30 pm in a brushy area located within the Central Texas Army post's training ground. He had gone missing for days while conducting an exercise for testing basic map-reading and navigation skills. A massive search had been conducted, with over 3,000 parties scouring the countryside. According to autopsy records, he had died from hyperthermia and dehydration. According to an Army investigatory report, "a multitude of procedural violations, judgment errors, and alleged acts of misconduct by Army trainers that not only contributed to Sprader's death but put some 300 other soldiers in danger that day, including about two dozen who required medical attention" had occurred.

=== 2009 shooting ===
On 5 November 2009, an Islamic gunman, who regarded himself as a mujahid waging jihad against the United States, opened fire in the Soldier Readiness Center of Fort Hood and killed 13 people while wounding 32 others. Nidal Malik Hasan, a U.S. Army major and psychiatrist, was the gunman. He was shot and then arrested by Department of the Army police officers Sergeant Mark Todd and Sergeant Kimberly Munley.

Eyewitnesses to the actual events said: "...Major Hasan wheeled on Sergeant Munley as she rounded the corner of a building and shot her, putting her on the ground. Then, Major Hasan turned his back on her and started putting another magazine into his pistol. It was at that moment that Senior Sgt. Mark Todd, a veteran police officer, rounded another corner of the building, found Major Hasan fumbling with his weapon and shot him."

In 2013, Hasan was convicted of 13 counts of premeditated murder and 32 counts of attempted premeditated murder for the 30 soldiers and two civilian police officers injured in the shooting. On 23 August 2013, Hasan was found guilty on all charges and was sentenced to death.

A memorial site in Killeen, featuring 13 granite columns inscribed with the names and likenesses of the victims, was dedicated in March 2016. The memorial was financed by donations and built by volunteers.

=== 2011 attack plot ===
Pfc. Naser Jason Abdo, an AWOL private, was arrested near Fort Hood, and in a statement by the police chief of Killeen, Texas, the man told investigators that he wanted to attack fellow soldiers at the military post. At his trial in August 2012, Abdo stated, through a cloth mask, "I will continue until the day the dead are called to account for their deeds." Abdo was sentenced to life in prison for the plot.

=== 2014 shootings ===
On 2 April 2014, a shooting spree occurred at several locations on the base, leaving three people dead and 14 others wounded. The gunman then died from a self-inflicted gunshot wound. He was later identified as 34-year-old Ivan Lopez, an Iraq War veteran.

=== 2014–2023 ===
A sexual assault-prevention officer on the base, Sergeant First Class Gregory McQueen, was dishonorably discharged in March 2015, having been convicted of organizing a prostitution ring.

Currently, Fort Hood has nearly 65,000 soldiers and family members and serves as a home for these units: Headquarters III Corps; First Army Division West; 1st Cavalry Division; 13th Sustainment Command (formerly 13th Corps Support Command); 89th Military Police Brigade; 504th Battlefield Surveillance Brigade; 85th Civil Affairs Brigade; 1st Medical Brigade; and 69th Air Defense Artillery Brigade. Fort Hood also includes Carl R. Darnall Army Medical Center and the Medical and Dental Activities as tenant units.

As of October 2015, Killeen, Texas, started a land-use study to "identify and mitigate compatibility and encroachment issues that may impact training, operations".

Command climate and culture

In 2020, a debate around renaming US military bases named after Confederate generals emerged during protests sparked from the murder of George Floyd. Fort Hood was one such base at the center of the controversy.

Thirty-nine soldiers stationed at the base died or went missing in 2020. The murder of Vanessa Guillén at Fort Hood in April 2020 brought national attention to the base and the broader culture of sexual harassment in the military. Hundreds of people protested at the gates of Fort Hood in June demanding justice for Guillén. In August, a San Antonio man was arrested and charged with making terroristic threats after threatening to commit a mass shooting at Fort Hood in retaliation for Guillén's killing. 14 commanders were subsequently fired or suspended with Army Secretary Ryan McCarthy citing "leadership failures". An investigation by Fort Hood Independent Review Committee (FHIRC), a panel McCarthy established, found that there was a "permissive environment for sexual assault and sexual harassment at Fort Hood." Army regulation AR-600-20 (24 July 2020) now requires the filing of commander's critical information reports (CCIRs) 8 days after a SHARP (sexual harassment/assault response & prevention) complaint by a victim. Fort Hood CID investigators assigned to their cases are hampered by a checklist mentality from their beginnings as junior investigators straight out of initial training from Fort Leonard Wood, according to the FHIRC report. The majority of CID investigators are then detailed to protective services for senior Pentagon officials, thereby moving straight to middle management CID positions without the requisite experience in criminal investigation. After Private Carlton L. Chee was the 28th death of 2020 in September, Congress launched an investigation of Fort Hood, citing the deaths and other felonies that occurred on the fort between 2014 and 2019. Commanders at the FORSCOM, III Corps, and Fort Hood levels now have specific actions to complete upon a sexual assault review board complaint. The Army CID is being restructured: a civilian director reporting directly to the Secretary of the Army will oversee criminal probes. The Provost Marshal and the Military Police will no longer undertake criminal investigations. A new branch like those in the Air Force and Navy for Special Agents will be instituted. FORSCOM now requires the selection of investigating officers from outside an installation's brigade-sized element, which is processing a complaint.

More than 100 night-vision goggles (NVGs) from an arms room were gradually stolen from March until May 2021. Several dozen were subsequently offered for sale on the internet from a reseller in Corpus Christi, Texas, as of 9 July 2021; some devices had already been sold and shipped. CID and Homeland Security believe the NVGs were stolen from shipping containers at Fort Hood.

=== 2023–2025 renaming ===
The fort is one of the U.S. Army installations named for Confederate soldiers that was renamed by the Naming Commission. On 24 May 2022, the commission recommended the fort be renamed to Fort Cavazos, after Gen. Richard E. Cavazos, a native Texan and the US Army's first Hispanic four-star general. The recommendation report was finalized and submitted to Congress on 1 October 2022, giving the US Secretary of Defense Lloyd Austin the authority to rename the post to Fort Cavazos. On 5 January 2023, William A. LaPlante, Under Secretary of Defense for Acquisition and Sustainment directed the full implementation of the recommendations of the Naming Commission across the Department of Defense. Fort Hood was officially renamed Fort Cavazos on 9 May 2023.

On 4 May 2023, Hood Army Airfield was renamed Yoakum–DeFrenn Army Heliport.

On 10 June 2025, it was announced that the base would be renamed back to Fort Hood, this time in honor of Col. Robert B. Hood, a recipient of the Distinguished Service Cross, who served during World War I. The redesignation took effect on 11 June 2025.

=== 2026–present ===
In 2026, the United Football League organized a football game between the Dallas Renegades and Orlando Storm at the base's Phantom Warrior Stadium. On October 6, 2026, the Secretary of the Army announced that Fort Hood Shooter Nidal Hasan's execution would be carried out by a U.S. Army firing squad at the base on December 3, 2026 at 1:00 PM Central Time.

== Antiwar activity ==
The post has served as a hub for antiwar activity during both the Vietnam War (e.g. the "Fort Hood Three" incident) and the war on terror.

From 1968 to 1973, the Oleo Strut was a GI coffeehouse located near post in Killeen, Texas. The coffee house was featured in the documentary Sir! No Sir!.

In 2009, the tradition of the Oleo Strut continued when the Under the Hood Café opened. The location serves as an outreach center for antiwar activists to reach out to area soldiers and provide them with support. Under the Hood Café announced on 10 November 2014 that it would close by the end of the year.

Recently, several soldiers supported by Under the Hood have taken public acts of resistance, including Amnesty International prisoner of conscience Travis Bishop.

== Demographics ==
Historical population
Census	Pop.	Note	%±
1970	32,597		—
1980	31,250		−4.1%
1990	35,580		13.9%
2000	33,711		−5.3%
2010	29,589		−12.2%
2020	28,295		−4.4%
U.S. Decennial Census; 1850–1900 1910; 1920 1930 1940; 1950 1960 1970; 1980 1990 2000; 2010

Location of the main cantonment of Fort Hood, Texas

Fort Hood first appeared as an unincorporated community in the 1970 U.S. census and then as a census-designated place in the 1980 United States census.

=== 2020 census ===
Fort Hood, Texas – Racial and ethnic composition Note: the US Census treats Hispanic/Latino as an ethnic category. This table excludes Latinos from the racial categories and assigns them to a separate category. Hispanics/Latinos may be of any race.
Race / Ethnicity (NH = Non-Hispanic)	Pop 2000	Pop 2010	Pop 2020	% 2000	% 2010	% 2020
White alone (NH)	15,274	16,008	13,509	45.31%	54.10%	47.74%
Black or African American alone (NH)	10,346	4,955	4,521	30.69%	16.75%	15.98%
Native American or Alaska Native alone (NH)	326	248	180	0.97%	0.84%	0.64%
Asian alone (NH)	691	620	1,023	2.05%	2.10%	3.62%
Native Hawaiian or Pacific Islander alone (NH)	245	493	354	0.73%	1.67%	1.25%
Other race alone (NH)	93	64	116	0.28%	0.22%	0.41%
Mixed race or Multiracial (NH)	1,106	1,278	1,748	3.28%	4.32%	6.18%
Hispanic or Latino (any race)	5,630	5,923	6,844	16.70%	20.02%	24.19%
Total	33,711	29,589	28,295	100.00%	100.00%	100.00%

As of the 2020 United States census, there were 28,295 people, 2,893 households, and 2,720 families residing in the Fort Cavazos CDP.

As of the census of 2000, there were 33,711 people, 5,819 households, and 5,679 families residing in the Fort Cavazos CDP. The population density was 2,255.7 people per square mile (870.6/km^{2}). There were 5,941 housing units at an average density of 397.5 per square mile (153.4/km^{2}). The racial makeup of the CDP was 50.7% White, 31.6% African American, 1.2% Native American, 2.1% Asian, 0.8% Pacific Islander, 8.7% from other races, and 4.8% from two or more races. 16.7% of the population were Hispanics or Latinos of any race.

There were 5,818 households, out of which 87.6% had children under the age of eighteen living with them, 87.1% were married couples living together, 8.2% had a female householder with no husband present, and 2.4% were non-families. Two percent of all households were made up of individuals, and 0.0% had someone living alone who is sixty-five years of age or older. The average household size was 3.92 and the average family size was 3.95.

The age distribution was 33.3% under the age of eighteen, 32.3% from eighteen to twenty-four, 33.1% from twenty-five to forty-four, 1.2% from forty-five to sixty-four, and 0.1% who were sixty-five years of age or older. The median age was twenty-one years. For every one hundred females there were 163.4 males. For every one hundred females over the age of eighteen there were 209.4 males. All of these statistics are typical for military bases.

The median income for a household on the base was $32,552, and the median income for a family was $32,296. Males had a median income of $18,884 versus $17,101 for females. The per capita income for the CDP was $11,078. 9.5% of the population and 8.3% of families were below the poverty line. Out of the total population, 11.0% of those under the age of eighteen and 25.8% of those sixty-five and older were living below the poverty line.

== Military base ==
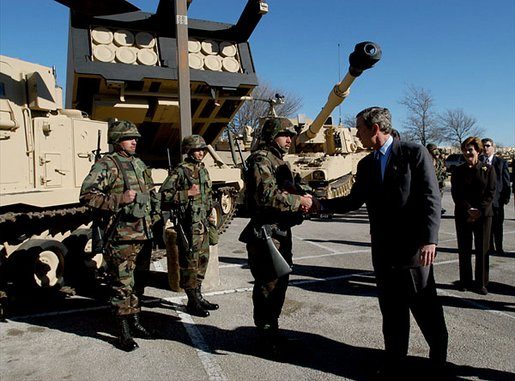
President George W. Bush meets U.S. Army Soldiers during a visit to Fort Hood, January 2003

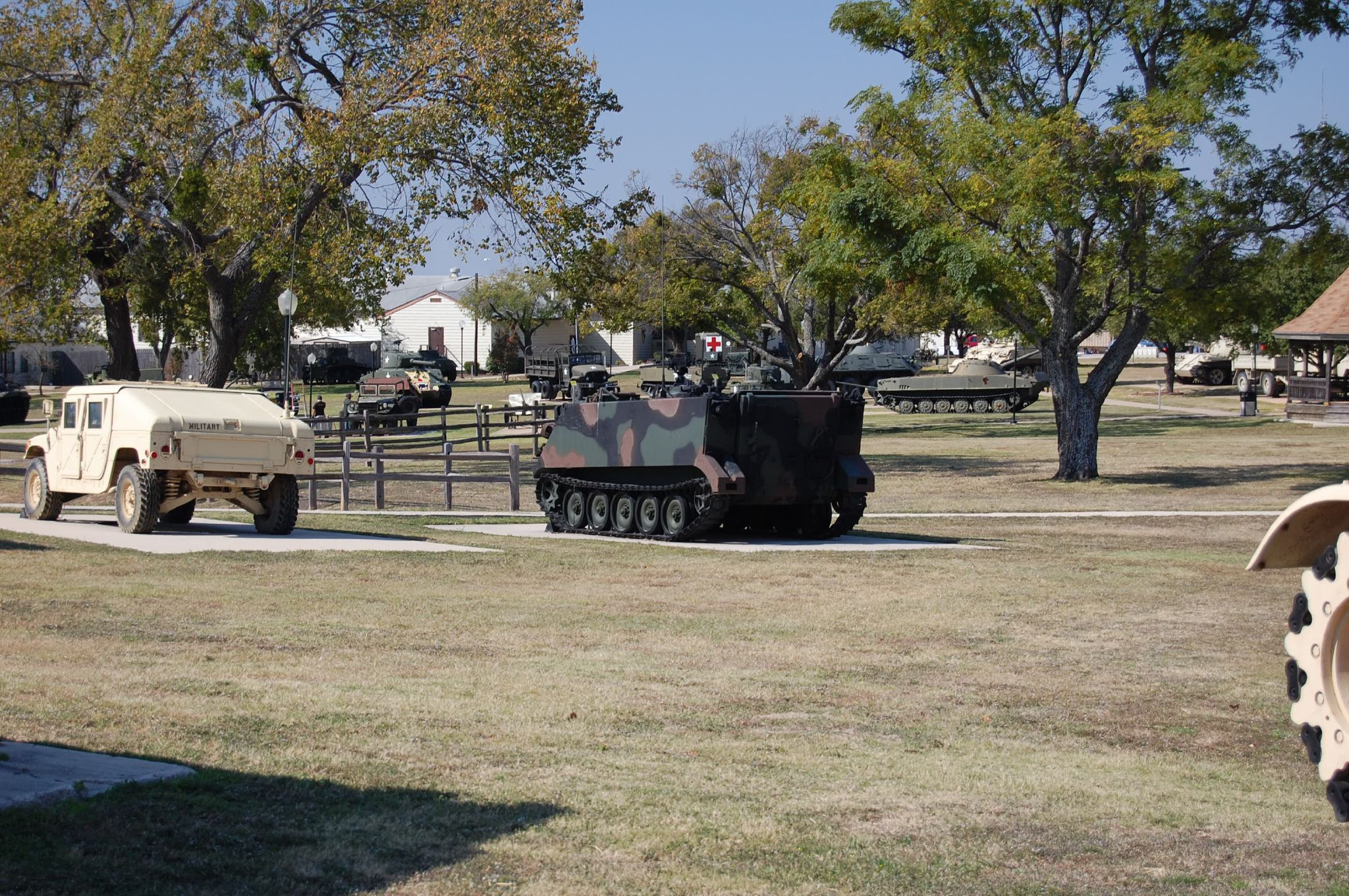
1st Cavalry Division Museum

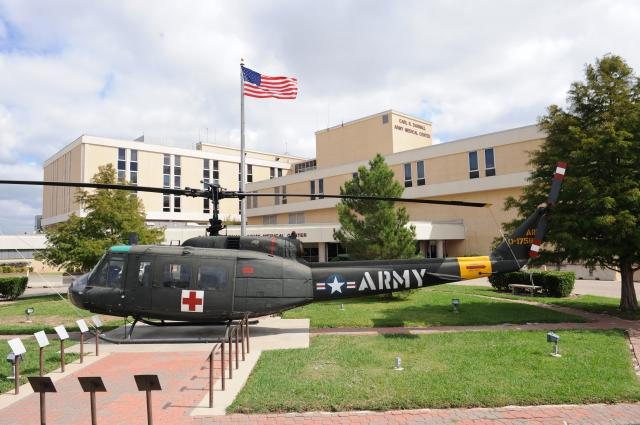
Carl R. Darnall Army Medical Center

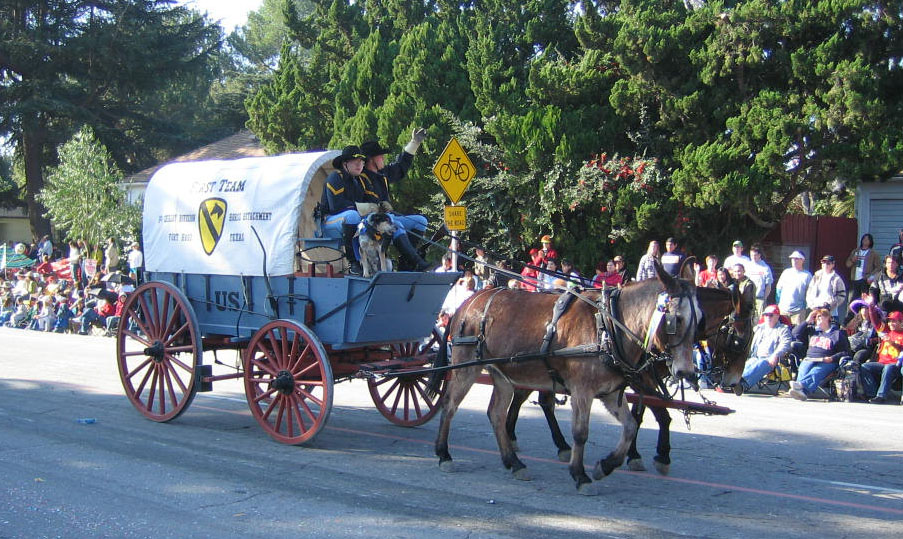
First Cavalry Division, U.S. Army, Fort Hood, Texas at the 2007 Rose Parade

Fort Hood is a large United States military installation; it is the home of III Armored Corps, 1st Cavalry Division, 13th Sustainment Command, First Army Division West, 3rd Cavalry Regiment, 1st Medical Brigade and many other Forces Command and other units.

The 4th Infantry Division completed its move from Fort Hood to Fort Carson, Colorado, exchanging positions with several units. The 4th Infantry Division Museum closed at Fort Hood for the last time on 29 May 2009 to complete its move to Colorado although most of the outdoor pieces remained at Fort Hood as part of the new 3CR Museum.

Before the breakup of the Soviet Union, Fort Hood was billed as the largest military base in the free world (Fort Benning is larger in personnel, Fort Bliss in land area). During peacetime, Fort Hood is a gated post, with the 1st Cavalry Division Museum, the Belton Lake Outdoor Recreation Area (BLORA), and a number of other facilities that are open to the public. Access to the cantonments became restricted starting in July 2001. However, passes are available to visit the two museums on post, and the lake area remains open to the public without restriction since it is outside the cantonments. Various events, including the annual Independence Day celebration, which has one of the largest fireworks displays in the country, are open to the public.

Shortly after the 2000 census, responsibility for post housing was turned over to privatized partnership with Actus Lend Lease. Under the terms of the contract, most of the housing has been remodeled or rebuilt, and hundreds of new units have been built or are in the process of being built, operating as Fort Hood Family Housing, and later as Cavalry Family Housing.

Fort Hood consists of three sections: the main cantonment, West Fort Hood, and North Fort Hood. The main cantonment is bounded by Killeen on the east and Copperas Cove on the west. The Fort Hood main cantonment area, otherwise referred to as Main post, holds its own airfield, Yoakum–DeFrenn Army Heliport. North Fort Hood is bounded by Gatesville to the northwest. West Fort Hood, bounded by Killeen and Copperas Cove, includes Fort Hood' second airfield, Robert Gray Army Airfield, which has been expanded for civilian use (Killeen Regional Airport (GRK)) and additional training areas. To the east and southeast, the reservation is bounded by Harker Heights, Nolanville, Belton, and Morgan's Point Resort.

== Education ==
The eight K-12 schools on Fort Hood, used to educate dependent children living on-post, are part of the Killeen Independent School District. Six of them are elementary schools, and one each are a middle and a high school. Duncan Elementary School, previously on Fort Hood, closed.

Early College High School of Killeen ISD is on-post.

No schools operated by the Department of Defense Education Activity (DoDEA) are on-post.

According to Texas legislation, Central Texas College's service area includes Killeen ISD. The college has a campus site on-post.

== Notable residents ==
- Mark Adickes – football player, surgeon, commentator (Originally from Bad Cannstatt, Stuttgart, Germany)
- Donald Buckram – football player
- Robert Griffin III – football player (Originally from Okinawa, Japan)
- Ciara - R&B singer
- Bobby Luna – football player (Originally from Lewisburg, Tennessee)
- Josh Lovelady – football player
- Tamera Mowry – actress (Originally from Gelnhausen, Hesse, Germany)
- Tia Mowry – actress (Originally from Gelnhausen, Hesse, Germany)
- Donald Prell – futurologist and author (Originally from Los Angeles, California)
- Elvis Presley – singer, actor (Originally from Tupelo, Mississippi)
- Geoff Ramsey – film producer, actor (Originally from Mobile, Alabama)
- Lucas Till – actor
- Anna Todd – author (Originally from Dayton, Ohio)
- Yoon Mi-rae – American-born South Korean singer
- Vanessa Guillén, U.S. Army specialist and murder victim (Originally from Houston, Texas)

== See also ==
- List of World War II prisoner-of-war camps in the United States
