= Joint Force Land Component Commander =

Joint Force Land Component Commander (JFLCC), is a United States Department of Defense doctrinal term. It is pronounced "JIF-lick".

It refers to an individual of general officer rank that is responsible for land forces within a joint operations environment. The term "land forces" encompasses ground forces such as infantry or armored units.

As defined in Joint Doctrine Document 1-02, the JFLCC is:

"The commander within a unified command, subordinate unified command, or joint task force responsible to the establishing commander for making recommendations on the proper employment of assigned, attached, and/or made available for tasking land forces; planning and coordinating land operations; or accomplishing such operational missions as may be assigned. The joint force land component commander is given the authority necessary to accomplish missions and tasks assigned by the establishing commander."

== Confusion of term ==
While the position is usually held by a United States Army officer in most joint warfighting environments, an officer of another service can be a JFLCC, if that service has the preponderance of land forces in theater (i.e. a Marine Corps unit commander).

== See also ==
- Joint Force Air Component Commander (JFACC)
- Joint Force Maritime Component Commander (JFMCC)
