= Joint Force Air Component Commander =

Officer that is responsible for air forces within a joint operations environment

Joint Forces Air Component Commander (JFACC) is a United States Department of Defense doctrinal term. It is pronounced "Jay-Fack".

It refers to a senior officer who is responsible for the air forces within a joint force; i.e., a military force composed of forces from two or more military departments. The term "air forces" encompasses aircraft from any service not already designated to specifically support ground forces (e.g., a marine air wing as part of a MAGTF or "organic" Army aviation assets).

The tool by which the JFACC tasks assets is called an air tasking order (ATO).

As defined in Joint Publication 1-02, the JFACC is:

"The commander within a unified command, subordinate unified command, or joint task force responsible to the establishing commander for making recommendations on the proper employment of assigned, attached, and/or made available for tasking air forces; planning and coordinating air operations; or accomplishing such operational missions as may be assigned. The joint force air component commander is given the authority necessary to accomplish missions and tasks assigned by the establishing commander."

== Confusion ==
While the position is often held by an aeronautically rated United States Air Force officer, an aeronautically designated officer of any other service can be the JFACC, if that service has the preponderance of air forces in theater (e.g., a U.S. Navy aircraft carrier strike group; a U.S. Marine Corps air-ground task force) and the ability to command and control those forces.

The JFACC is the commander of the air component of the joint force.

== See also ==
- Air Operations Center
- Joint Force Land Component Commander (JFLCC)
- Joint Force Maritime Component Commander (JFMCC)
