= List of United States Air Force air support operations squadrons =

List of United States Air Force air support operations squadrons identifies all air support operations squadrons in the United States Air Force. ASOS squadrons are made up of Tactical Air Control Party airmen, Air Liaison Officers and other support airmen.

Air Support Operations Squadrons
Squadron	Shield	Location	Supported Unit	Status
1st Air Support Operations Squadron		Mihail Kogălniceanu, Romania	Various deployed units	Active
2nd Air Support Operations Squadron		Vilseck, Germany	2d Cavalry Regiment & 173d Airborne Brigade Combat Team	Active
3rd Air Support Operations Squadron		Joint Base Elmendorf-Richardson and Fort Wainwright, Alaska	11th Airborne Division	Active
4th Air Support Operations Squadron		Various locations across Eastern Europe	Various deployed units	Active
5th Air Support Operations Squadron		Fort Lewis, Washington	2d Infantry Division, 2d Ranger Battalion, 1st Special Forces Group	Active
7th Air Support Operations Squadron		Fort Bliss, Texas	1st Armored Division	Active
8th Air Support Operations Squadron		Aviano Air Base, Italy	173rd Airborne Brigade	Active
9th Air Support Operations Squadron		Fort Hood, Texas	1st Cavalry Division	Active
10th Air Support Operations Squadron		Fort Riley, Kansas	1st Infantry Division	Active
11th Air Support Operations Squadron		Fort Hood, Texas	3d Armored Cavalry Regiment	Inactive
13th Air Support Operations Squadron		Fort Carson, Colorado	4th Infantry Division	Active
14th Air Support Operations Squadron		Pope Field, North Carolina	82d Airborne Division	Active
15th Air Support Operations Squadron		Fort Stewart, Georgia	3rd Infantry Division	Active
16th Air Support Operations Squadron		Fort Richardson, Alaska	25th Infantry Division	Inactive
17th Air Support Operations Squadron		Fort Benning, Georgia	75th Ranger Regiment	Redesignated 17th Special Tactics Squadron
19th Air Support Operations Squadron		Fort Campbell, Kentucky	101st Airborne Division, 5th Special Forces Group	Active
20th Air Support Operations Squadron		Fort Drum, New York	10th Mountain Division	Active
21st Air Support Operations Squadron		Fort Polk, Louisiana		Inactive
24th Expeditionary Air Support Operations Squadron		Al Udeid Air Base	Various deployed units	Active
25th Air Support Operations Squadron		Wheeler AAF, Hawaii	25th Infantry Division	Active
72d Expeditionary Air Support Operations Squadron		undisclosed location	Various deployed units	Active
75th Expeditionary Air Support Operations Squadron		undisclosed location	Various deployed units	Active
82d Expeditionary Air Support Operations Squadron		Camp Buehring	Various deployed units	Active
84th Expeditionary Air Support Operations Squadron		Ali Al Salem Air Base	Various deployed units	Active
85th Expeditionary Air Support Operations Squadron		undisclosed location	Various deployed units	Active
111th Air Support Operations Squadron		Camp Murray, Washington	81st Heavy Brigade Combat Team Washington State Army National Guard	Washington ANG
113th Air Support Operations Squadron		Terre Haute, Indiana	76th Infantry Brigade Combat Team Indiana Army National Guard	Indiana ANG
116th Air Support Operations Squadron		Camp Murray, Washington	81st Armored Brigade Combat Team Washington State Army National Guard	Washington ANG
118th Air Support Operations Squadron		Badin, North Carolina	30th Heavy Brigade Combat Team North Carolina Army National Guard	North Carolina ANG
122d Air Support Operations Squadron		Pineville, Louisiana	256th Infantry Brigade Combat Team Louisiana Army National Guard	Louisiana ANG
124th Air Support Operations Squadron		Gowen Field, Idaho	116th Armored Cavalry Regiment Idaho Army National Guard	Idaho ANG
146th Air Support Operations Squadron		Will Rogers ANGB, Oklahoma	45th Infantry Brigade Combat Team Oklahoma Army National Guard	Oklahoma ANG
147th Air Support Operations Squadron		Houston, Texas	36th Infantry Division Texas Army National Guard	Texas ANG
148th Air Support Operations Squadron		Fort Indiantown Gap, Pennsylvania	56th Stryker Brigade, 55th Armor Brigade Pennsylvania Army National Guard	Pennsylvania ANG
165th Air Support Operations Squadron		Garden City, Georgia	48th Infantry Brigade Combat Team Georgia Army National Guard, 53rd Infantry Brigade Combat Team Florida Army National Guard, 29th Infantry Division	Georgia ANG
168th Air Support Operations Squadron		Peoria, Illinois	33rd Infantry Brigade Combat Team Illinois Army National Guard	Illinois ANG
169th Air Support Operations Squadron		Peoria, Illinois	34th Infantry Division Iowa Army National Guard	Illinois ANG
227th Air Support Operations Squadron		Atlantic City, New Jersey	28th Infantry Division Pennsylvania Army National Guard	New Jersey ANG
238th Air Support Operations Squadron		Key Field, Mississippi	155th Armored Brigade Combat Team Mississippi Army National Guard	Mississippi ANG
274th Air Support Operations Squadron		Hancock Field Air National Guard Base, Syracuse, New York	42nd Infantry Division, New York Army National Guard 27th Infantry Brigade Combat Team, New York Army National Guard 86th Infantry Brigade Combat Team, Vermont National Guard	New York ANG
284th Air Support Operations Squadron		McConnell AFB, Kansas	35th Infantry Division Kansas Army National Guard	Kansas ANG
604th Air Support Operations Squadron		Camp Humphreys, South Korea	2d Infantry Division, 1st Special Forces Group	Active
682d Air Support Operations Squadron		Pope AFB, North Carolina	XVIII Airborne Corps	Active
712th Air Support Operations Squadron		Fort Hood, Texas	III Corps	Redesignated as the 803d Operations Support Squadron
717th Expeditionary Air Support Operations Squadron			Various deployed units	Inactive
730th Expeditionary Air Support Operations Squadron		Undisclosed Location	Various deployed units	Active
807th Expeditionary Air Support Operations Squadron		Undisclosed Location	Various deployed units	Active
817th Expeditionary Air Support Operations Squadron		Afghanistan	Various deployed units	Inactive
