= EASO =

EASO may refer to:

== People ==
- Molly Easo Smith (born 1958), an Indian-American professor
- San Sebastián, nicknamed la bella Easo (The beautiful Easo), a city in the Basque Autonomous Community, Spain

== Other uses ==
- EASO Choir, a choir in San Sebastián
- European Asylum Support Office
- Expeditionary Air Support Operations Squadrons (EASO):
  - 24th Expeditionary Air Support Operations Squadron
  - 72d Expeditionary Air Support Operations Squadron
  - 84th Expeditionary Air Support Operations Squadron
  - 730th Expeditionary Air Support Operations Squadron
  - 807th Expeditionary Air Support Operations Squadron
  - 817th Expeditionary Air Support Operations Squadron
