= 387th Air Expeditionary Group =

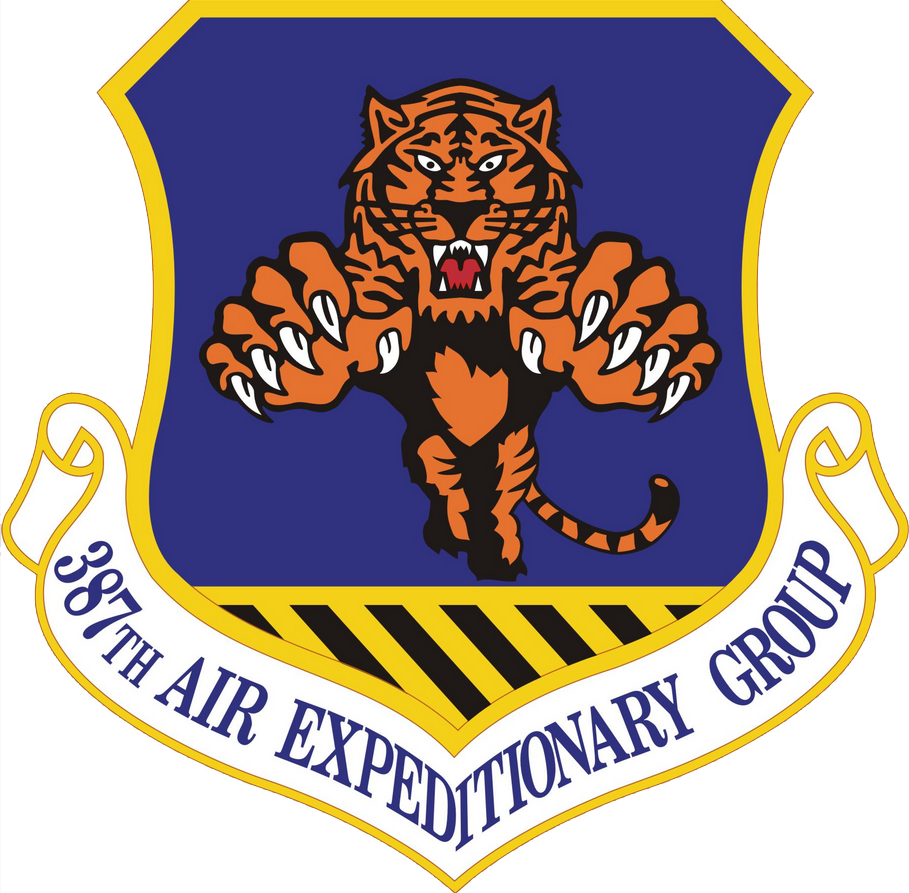
- Emblem of the 387th Air Expeditionary Group
- Active: 1942–1945; 2003–present
- Country: United States
- Branch: United States Air Force
- Part of: United States Air Forces Central Command
- Garrison/HQ: Abdullah Al-Mubarak Air Base, Kuwait; Ali Al Salem Air Base, Kuwait

Commanders
- Current commander: Colonel Rhett Brown

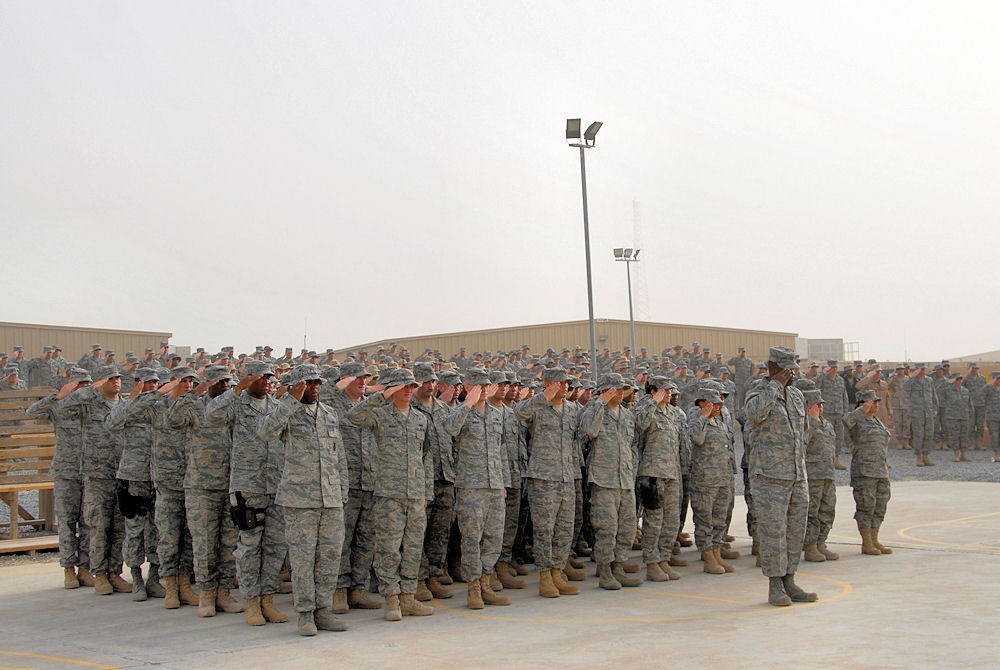
Airmen deployed to the 387th Air Expeditionary Group render a salute during a Memorial Day ceremony (Note: During the ceremony at an air base in the Persian Gulf Region, a 21-gun salute was conducted along with a laying of a wreath to honor the men and women who have died in military service.)

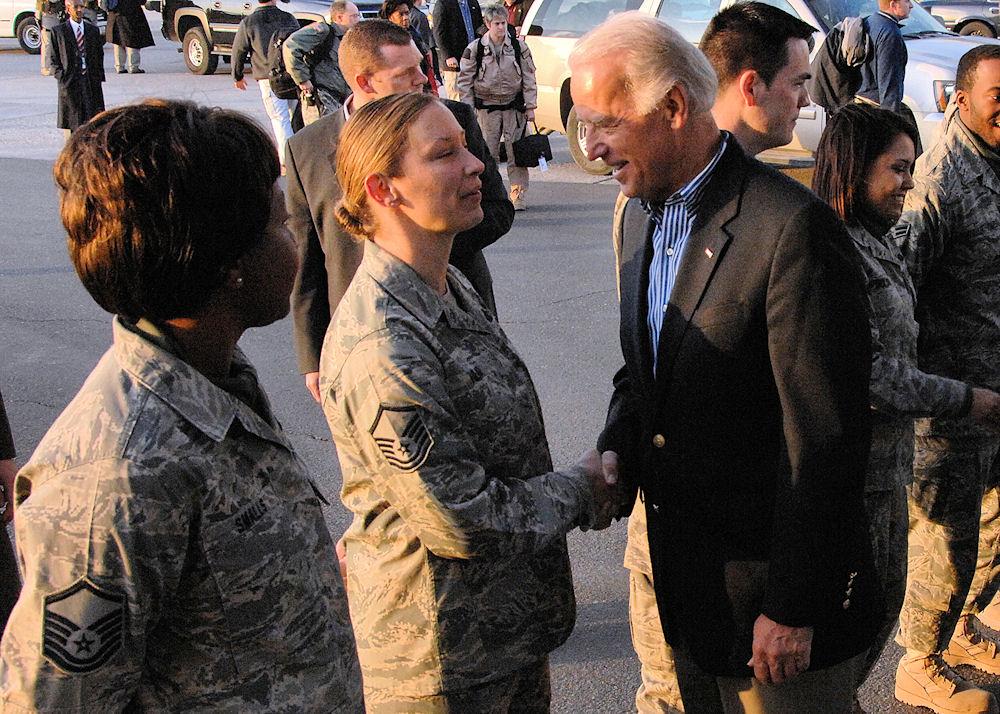
Airmen from the 387th Air Expeditionary Group greet Vice President-elect Joe Biden as he boards an aircraft headed to Iraq 12 January 2008.

The 387th Air Expeditionary Group is a United States Air Force unit assigned to Abdullah Al-Mubarak Air Base (Cargo City) in Kuwait. Since 2022, it has been a direct reporting unit to United States Air Forces Central Command. It was previously under the 386th Air Expeditionary Wing at Ali Al Salem Air Base, Kuwait. As a provisional unit assigned to Air Combat Command (ACC), it may be activated or inactivated by ACC at any time. In 2016, the group's mission was to provide support for base operations, coordination with host-nation partners, and administration of the joint-expeditionary-tasked individual augmentees in the United States Central Command area of responsibility.

During World War II, the group's predecessor unit, the 387th Bombardment Group, was a Martin B-26 Marauder bombardment group assigned to the Eighth and later Ninth Air Force in Western Europe.

== Expeditionary operations ==
The unit was activated in 2003 as a Fairchild Republic A-10 Thunderbolt II participating in Operation Iraqi Freedom, and was inactivated after the active conflict ended. It is currently an active tenant organization of the 386th Air Expeditionary Wing, stationed at both Abdullah Al-Mubarak Air Base, Kuwait, and Ali Al Salem Air Base, Kuwait, under Air Mobility Command.

The 387 AEG provides base operating support integration functions for Coalition forces and civilian contractors at one of the busiest United States Air Force Aerial Port of Debarkation worldwide. The Airmen of the 387th provide security, anti-terrorism and force protection, civil engineering, emergency management, personnel support, line-haul convoy operations, vehicle maintenance/fleet management, and base supply in support of the primary intra-theater airlift hub for all Joint and Coalition operations going into and out of Iraq and Afghanistan.

Units in 2016:

- 43rd Expeditionary Electronic Combat Squadron (EC-130H)
- 46th Expeditionary Reconnaissance Squadron (MQ-1, MQ-9)
- 387th Air Expeditionary Squadron (Joint-Expeditionary-Tasked Individual Augmentee — JET/IA)
- 737th Expeditionary Airlift Squadron (C-130)

Units in 2022:

- 387th Air Expeditionary Squadron
- 82nd Expeditionary Air Support Operations Squadron
- 22nd Expeditionary Combat Weather Squadron
- 443rd Aerospace Expeditionary Squadron

== History ==
=== 387th Bombardment Group ===
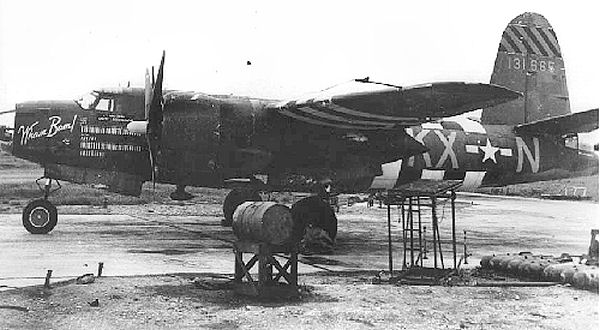
B-26B of the 558th Bomb Squadron (Note: Aircraft is Martin B-26B-15-MA Marauder, serial 41-31665.)

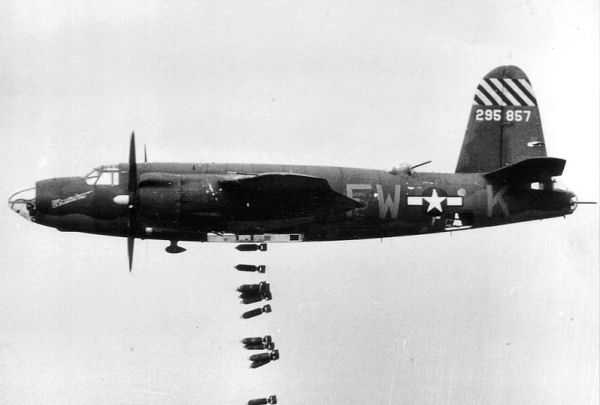
B-26B of the 556th Bomb Squadron (Note: Aircraft is Martin B-26B-50-MA Marauder, serial 42-95857.)

The 387th Bombardment Group (Medium) was constituted on 25 November 1942, and activated on 1 December 1942 at MacDill Field near Tampa, Florida. The group had four operational squadrons, the 556th, 557th, 558th, and 559th Bombardment Squadrons, and was equipped with the Martin B-26B/C Marauder. After training at several stateside airfields, the group was deployed to England in June 1943.

In England, the 387th was assigned to the Eighth Air Force's 3rd Bomb Wing and stationed at RAF Chipping Ongar in Essex. The 387th was the fourth Marauder group to arrive in the UK. The group began combat on 15 August 1943 by joining with three other B-26 groups attacking coastal defenses on the French Coast near Boulogne in conditions of thick fog. While taking off, one of the B-26 Bombers crashed at the end of the main runway, killing all of the crew members except the tail gunner. The group concentrated its attacks on airfields during the first months of operations. In common with other Marauder units of the 3rd Bomb Wing, the 387th was transferred to Ninth Air Force on 16 October 1943.

The group made tactical strikes on V-weapon sites in France in the winter of 1943 to 1944. The group hit airfields at Leeuwarden and Venlo during Big Week, 20–25 February 1944, the intensive campaign against the German Air Force and aircraft industry. The group helped to prepare for Operation Overlord, the invasion of Normandy, by attacking coastal batteries and bridges in France during May 1944. The 387th AEG bombed along the invasion coast on D-Day, 6 June 1944 and supported ground forces throughout the month by raiding railroads, bridges, road junctions, defended areas, and fuel dumps.

The 387th Bomb Group moved to RAF Stoney Cross in Hampshire on 18 July 1944 when Ninth Air Force moved the 98th Bomb Wing's four Marauder groups into the New Forest area at the earliest opportunity to place them closer to the French Normandy invasion beaches. On 21 July 1944, the 387th became operational from Stoney Cross, bombing along the invasion coast and supporting ground forces by raiding railways, bridges, road junctions, defended areas, and fuel dumps.

By 1 September 1944, the group was able to move across the English Channel to its Advanced Landing Ground at a former Luftwaffe airfield at Maupertus, France (A-15).

In April 1945 the group ended combat operations, and then on 24 May 1945 was sent to Rosières-en-Santerre Air Base, France, for several months. The 387th Bomb Group returned to the US in November and was inactivated at Camp Kilmer, New Jersey, on 17 November 1945.

=== 387th Air Expeditionary Group ===
The 387th Air Expeditionary Group was activated by Air Combat Command as part of the Global War on Terror in 2003. The 387th was a blend of attack and reconnaissance forces, consisting of close to 500 103 FW and 104 FW personnel and totaling approximately 1,300 personnel. A-10 Thunderbolt II aircraft were assigned to the 131st Expeditionary Fighter Squadron from the 131st Fighter Squadron (104th Fighter Wing, Massachusetts Air National Guard), Barnes Municipal Airport (11 aircraft), and the 118th Fighter Squadron (103rd Fighter Wing, Connecticut Air National Guard) from Bradley Air National Guard Base (seven Aircraft).

Together, the deployed A-10 pilots logged 1,119 sorties and 3,821 flying hours (3,100 combat hours during 900 sorties) with no combat losses or battle damage. The missions included 35 combat-search-and-rescue (CSAR) sorties, with the rescue of an aircraft crew and numerous medical evacuations.

In 2021, the 387th AEG assisted in the evacuation of over 124,000 Afghan personnel from Hamid Karzai International Airport in what was the largest humanitarian airlift in history.

In 2024, members of the 387th AEG deployed to the U.S. Central Command area of responsibility in support of Operation Inherent Resolve.

== Lineage ==
- Constituted as 387th Bombardment Group (Medium) on 25 November 1942

Redesignated 387th Bombardment Group, Medium
Activated on 1 December 1942
Inactivated on 17 November 1945
Redesignated 387th Bombardment Group on 31 July 1985 (Remained inactive)
Redesignated 387th Air Expeditionary Group and converted to provisional status 1 January 2003.
Activated in mid January 2003
Inactivated on 1 May 2003
Inactivated in 2024
Activated in 2024

=== Assignments ===
- III Bomber Command, 1 December 1942 – 10 June 1943
- 3d Bombardment Wing, 25 June 1943
- IX Bomber Command, 16 October 1943
- 98th Combat Bombardment Wing (later 98th Bombardment Wing), 5 December 1943 – November 1945
- Army Service Forces, Port of Embarkation (for inactivation), 14–17 November 1945
- Air Combat Command to activate or inactivate any time after 1 January 2003

Attached to United States Air Forces Central Command, 2003 – unknown
387th Air Expeditionary Wing, unknown – present

=== Components ===
- 556th Bombardment Squadron: 1 December 1942 – 17 November 1945
- 557th Bombardment Squadron: 1 December 1942 – 17 November 1945
- 558th Bombardment Squadron: 1 December 1942 – 17 November 1945
- 559th Bombardment Squadron: 1 December 1942 – 17 November 1945
- 131st Expeditionary Fighter Squadron, 2003
- 387th Expeditionary Logistics Readiness Squadron, 2003 – 6 March 2012
- 387th Expeditionary Support Squadron
- 387th Expeditionary Security Forces Squadron

=== Stations ===
- MacDill Field, Florida, 1 December 1942
- Drane Field, Florida, 12 April 1943
- Godman Field, Kentucky, c. 11 May – 10 June 1943
- RAF Chipping Ongar (AAF-162), England 25 June 1943
- RAF Stoney Cross (AAF-452), England 18 July 1944 452
- Maupertuis Airfield (A-15), France, 22 August 1944
- Chateaudun Airfield (A-39), France, 18 September 1944
- Clastres Airfield (A-71), France, 30 October 1944
- Maastricht Airfield (Y-44) Netherlands, 29 April 1945
- Rosieres-en-Santerre Airfield (B-87), France, 24 May – c. November 1945
- Camp Kilmer, New Jersey, 14–17 November 1945
- Prince Hassan Air Base (H5), Jordan, Mid January – 1 May 2003
- Abdullah Al-Mubarak Air Base, Kuwait, 2003–2024
- Ali Al Salem Air Base, Kuwait, 2024–present

== See also ==
- List of Martin B-26 Marauder operators
