= ASOS =

ASOS or Asos may refer to:

- Asos, a village in Greece
- ASOS (retailer), a UK online fashion store
- A Storm of Swords, a book in the A Song of Ice and Fire saga by G. R. R. Martin
- Action short of strike, industrial action undertaken by trade unions and their members which does not amount to an official or full strike (e.g. refusal to comply with certain orders, etc.)
- Association Sportive Oussou Saka, a Beninese football team
- Automated Surface Observing System, a type of weather station
- Air Support Operations Squadron, US Air Force, see List of United States Air Force air support operations squadrons
- A Saucerful of Secrets, the second album by Pink Floyd
- ASOS Brigade, a live-action fictional group to support the English dub release of the Haruhi Suzumiya anime television series.
