= 807 Squadron =

807 Squadron may refer to:

- 807 Naval Air Squadron, United Kingdom
- 807th Bombardment Squadron, United States Army Air Forces
- 807th Expeditionary Air Support Operations Squadron, United States Air Force
