= B26 =

B26, B-26 or B.26 may refer to:

== Games ==
- Sicilian Defence, Encyclopaedia of Chess Openings code

== Military ==
- BAM B26, a pellet gun manufactured in China
- Blackburn B.26 Botha, a British World War II torpedo bomber
- Douglas A-26 Invader, an American Cold War bomber, which was designated B-26 from 1948 until 1962
- Fokker B 26, a proposed dive bomber derived from the G.I for the Swedish Air Force
- Martin B-26 Marauder, an American World War II bomber
- Soviet submarine B-26, a Type IXC/40 U-boat originally built for Nazi Germany's Kriegsmarine during World War II and re-commissioned by the Soviet Navy for use during the Cold War

== Transportation ==
- Bundesstraße 26, a road in Germany
- B26 (New York City bus), an American bus route
