= 368th Expeditionary Air Support Operations Group =

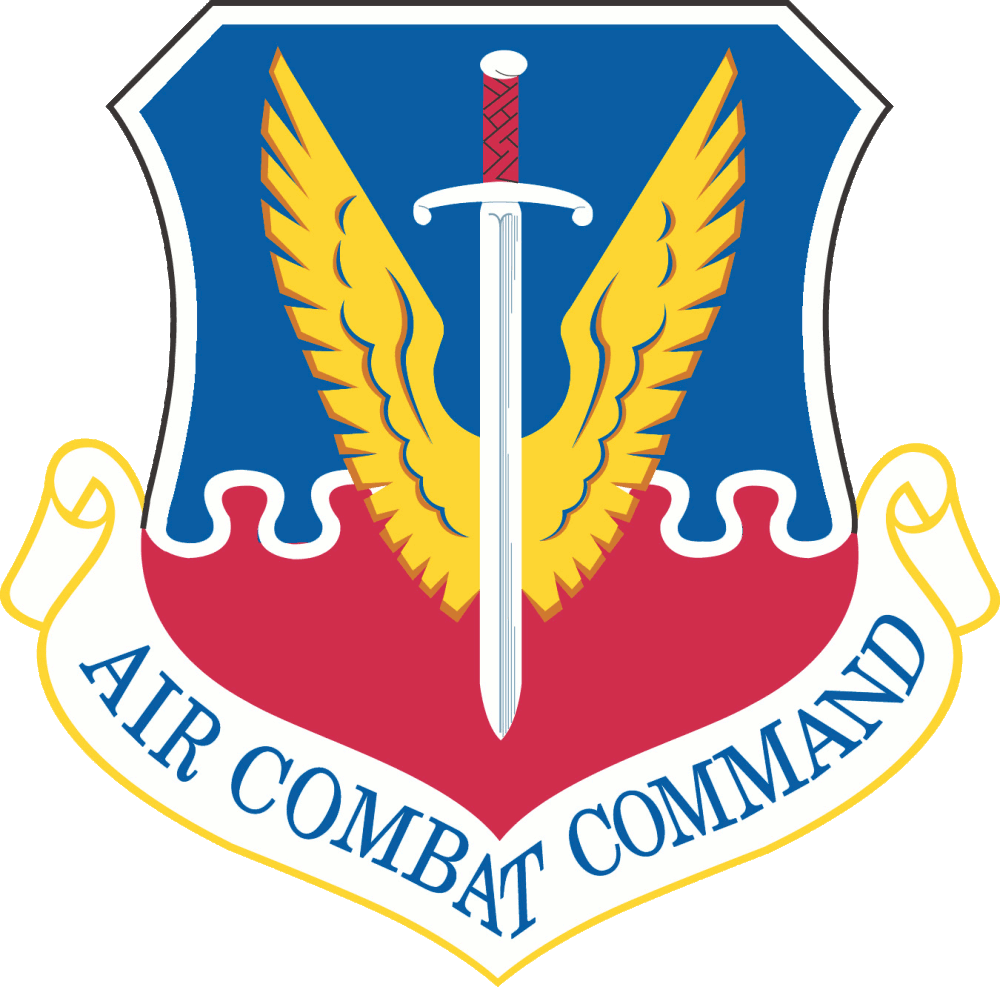
368th Expeditionary Air Support Operations Group
- Active: 1970–1974; by 2010–c. 18 November 2011
- Country: United States
- Branch: United States Air Force
- Type: Expeditionary
- Role: Air Support Operations
- Size: Group
- Part of: Air Combat Command
- Decorations: Air Force Outstanding Unit Award

Insignia
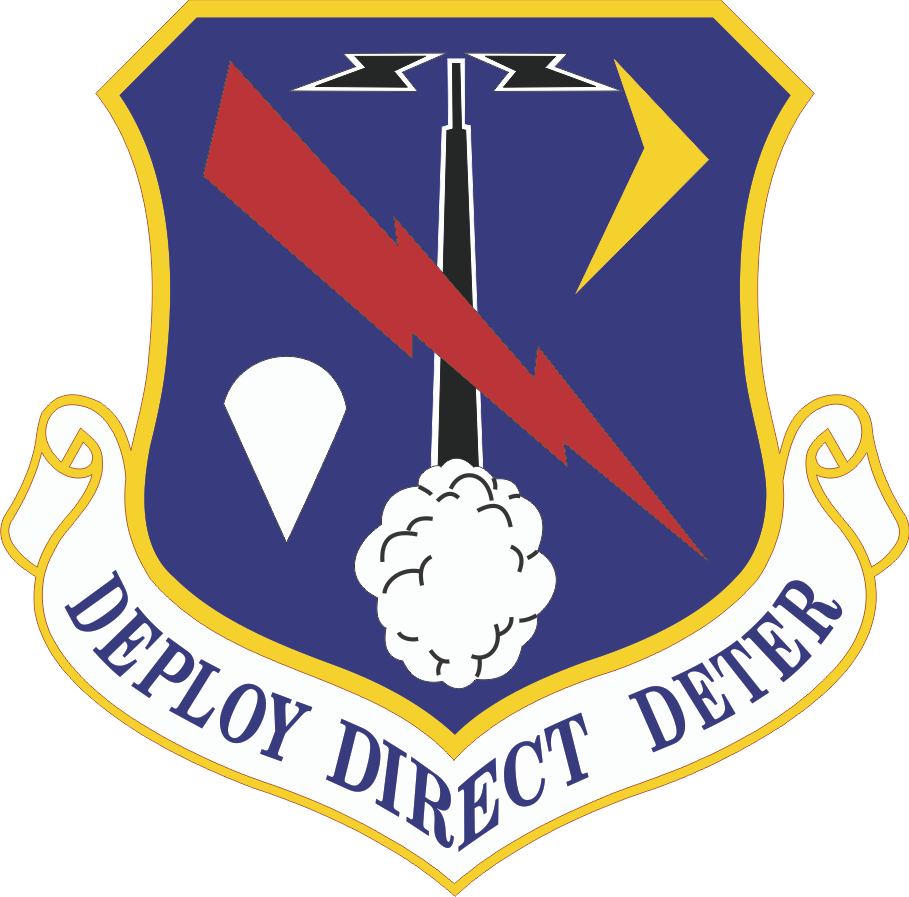
- 368th Expeditionary Air Support Operations Group (Note: Approved 29 June 1970.)

The 368th Expeditionary Air Support Operations Group is a combat support unit of the United States Air Force. The group provides overall tactical command and control of air power assets to the Joint Forces Air Component Commander and Joint Forces Commander for combat operations.

== History ==
=== Tactical Air Command ===
The group was first activated at Shaw Air Force Base, South Carolina as the 68th Tactical Air Support Group in January 1970, when it assumed the mission, personnel and equipment of the 4467th Tactical Air Support Group, which was simultaneously discontinued. The group trained and equipped tactical air support squadrons and tactical air control parties to control aircraft and communications systems in support of surface forces including tactical air strikes, reconnaissance and airlift. It was inactivated in 1974 and its mission transferred to the 507th Tactical Air Control Wing, which combined tactical control and tactical air support units for Ninth Air Force.

=== Expeditionary unit ===
During Operation Iraqi Freedom and Operation New Dawn it was located at an undisclosed location in Iraq (possibly Joint Base Balad). It supported Multi-National Corps - Iraq. As of 26 July 2010, it comprised two subordinate units:

- 22d Expeditionary Weather Squadron
- 82d Expeditionary Air Support Operations Squadron

The group was inactivated on 22 December 2011 following the withdrawal of US forces from Iraq and the cessation of Operation New Dawn.

In May 2015 the group was activated in support of Operation Inherent Resolve and Operation Spartan Shield. It is currently composed of four subordinate units:

- Detachment 1, Army Weather Support
- Detachment 2, Air Support Operations Center
- 72d Expeditionary Air Support Operations Squadron
- 82d Expeditionary Air Support Operations Squadron

== Lineage ==
- Established as the 68th Tactical Air Support Group on 2 December 1969

Activated on 15 January 1970
Inactivated on 15 June 1974

- Redesignated 368th Tactical Air Support Group on 31 July 1985
- Redesignated 368th Expeditionary Air Support Operations Group and converted to provisional status on 12 February 2009.

Activated by 20 July 2010
Inactivated c. 18 December 2011
Activated in May 2015

=== Assignments ===
- Ninth Air Force, 15 January 1970 – 15 June 1974
- Air Combat Command to activate or inactivate at any time on or after 12 February 2009

=== Components ===
- Air Education and Training Command Studies and Analysis Squadron, 31 August 1972 – 1 July 1974
- 22d Expeditionary Weather Squadron, by July 2010 – c. 18 November 2011
- 72d Expeditionary Air Support Operations Squadron, May 2015
- 82d Expeditionary Air Support Operations Squadron, by July 2010 – c. 18 November 2011, May 2015
- 424th Tactical Air Support Training Squadron, 1 January–31 October 1972
- 681st Direct Air Support Center Squadron, 1 December 1971 – 1 July 1974
- 682d Direct Air Support Center Squadron, 1 December 1971 – 1 July 1974
- 703d Special Operations Squadron (later 703d Tactical Air Support Squadron), 15 January 1970 – 15 June 1974
- 704th Tactical Air Support Squadron, 15 January 1970 – 15 June 1974

=== Aircraft ===
- Cessna O-2 Skymaster, 1970–1974
- Sikorsky CH-53, 1970–1973
- Sikorsky CH-3, 1970–1974
- Beechcraft QU-22 Pave Eagle, 1972
- North American Rockwell OV-10 Bronco, 1974
