= 721st Air Mobility Operations Group =

721st Air Mobility Operations Group

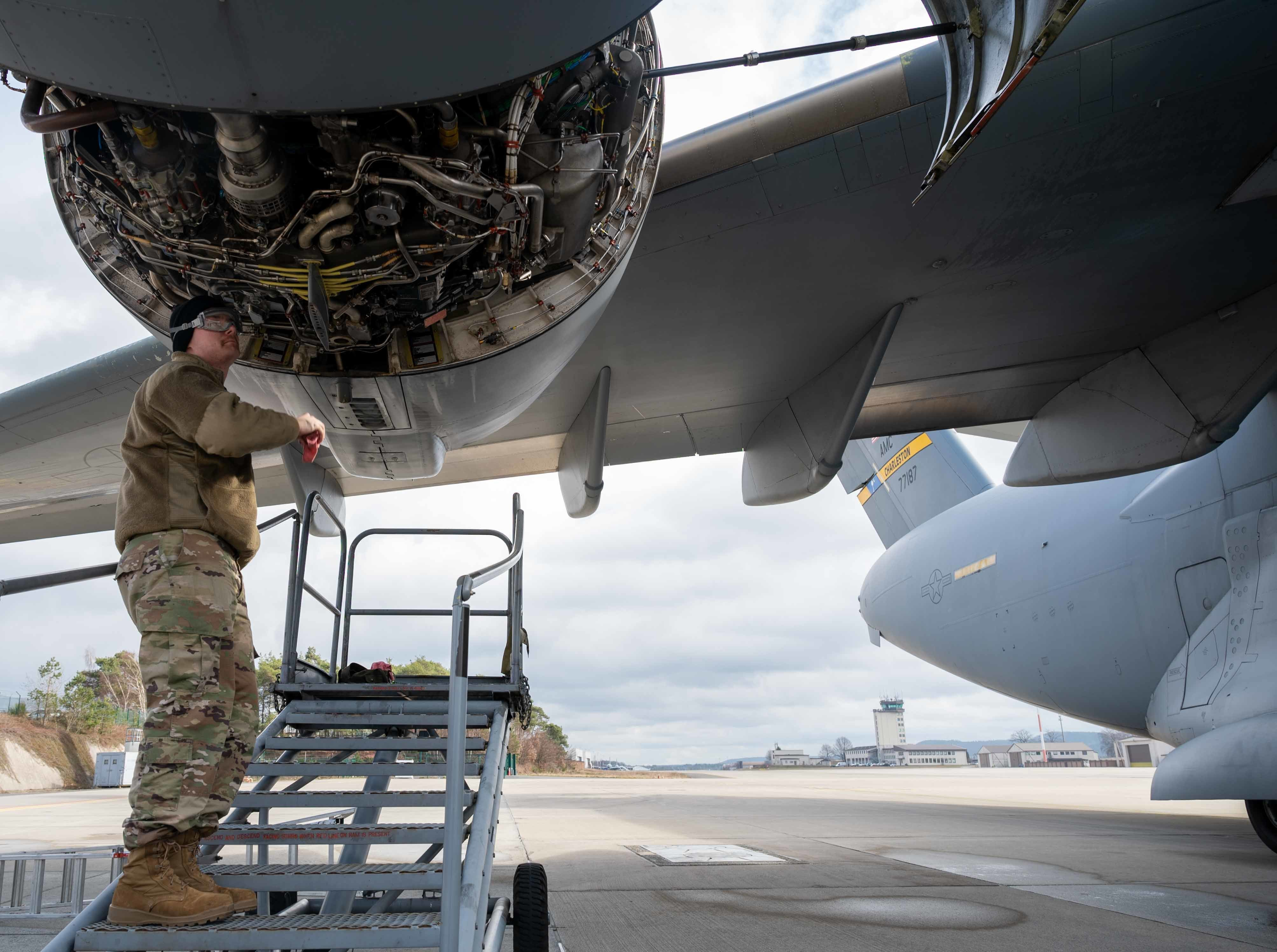
- An airman with the Group's 721st Aircraft Maintenance Squadron conducts an inspection on a C-17 Globemaster III at Ramstein AB, Germany in 2022
- Active: 1983 – present
- Country: United States
- Branch: United States Air Force
- Role: Airlift support
- Part of: Air Mobility Command: United States Air Force Expeditionary Center; 521st Air Mobility Operations Wing
- Garrison/HQ: Ramstein Air Base, Germany
- Engagements: Global war on terrorism
- Decorations: Air Force Meritorious Unit Award; Air Force Outstanding Unit Award

Insignia
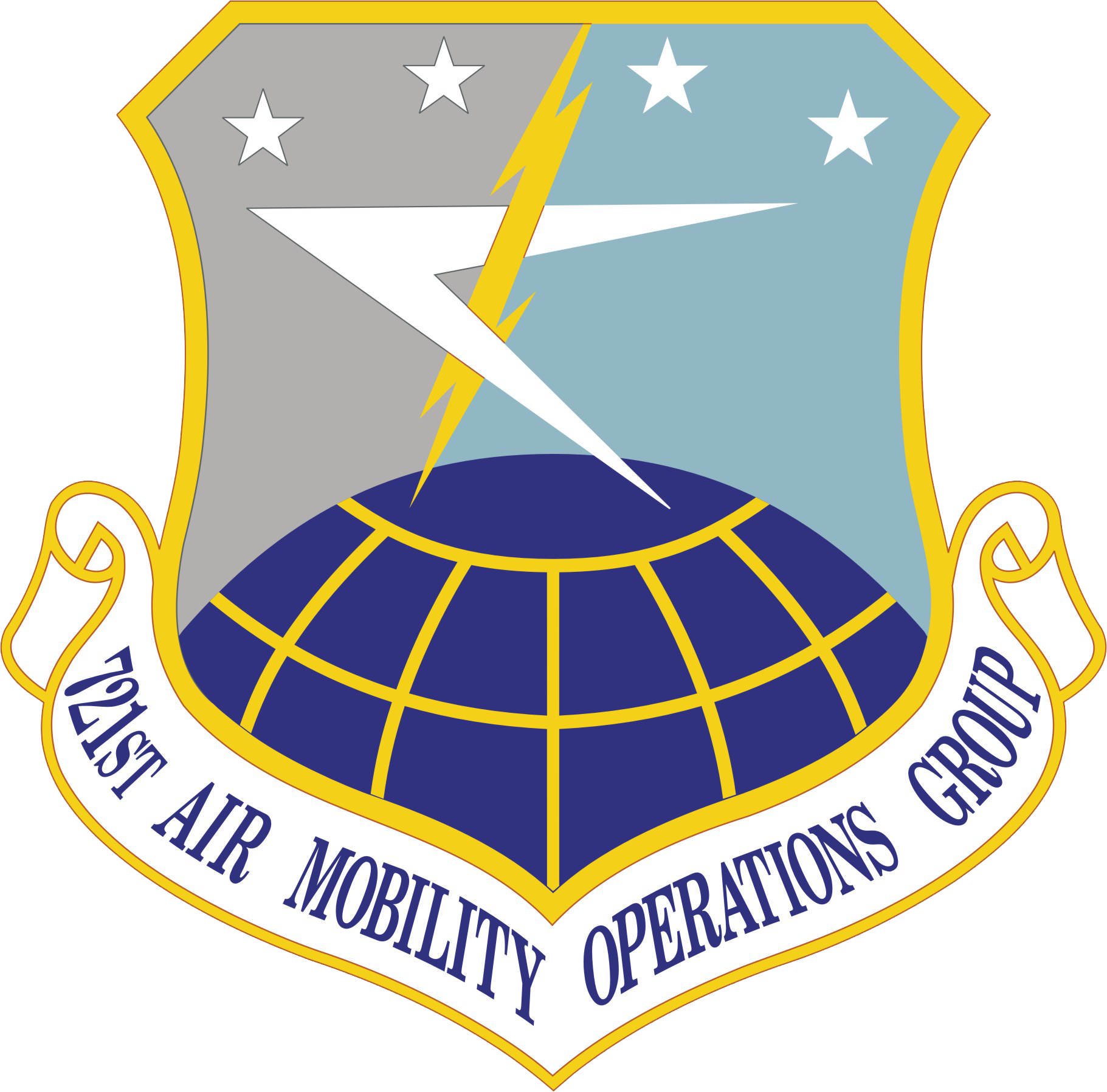
- 721st Air Mobility Operations Group emblem

The 721st Air Mobility Operations Group is a United States Air Force unit assigned to the 521st Air Mobility Operations Wing, stationed at Ramstein Air Base, Germany.

== History ==
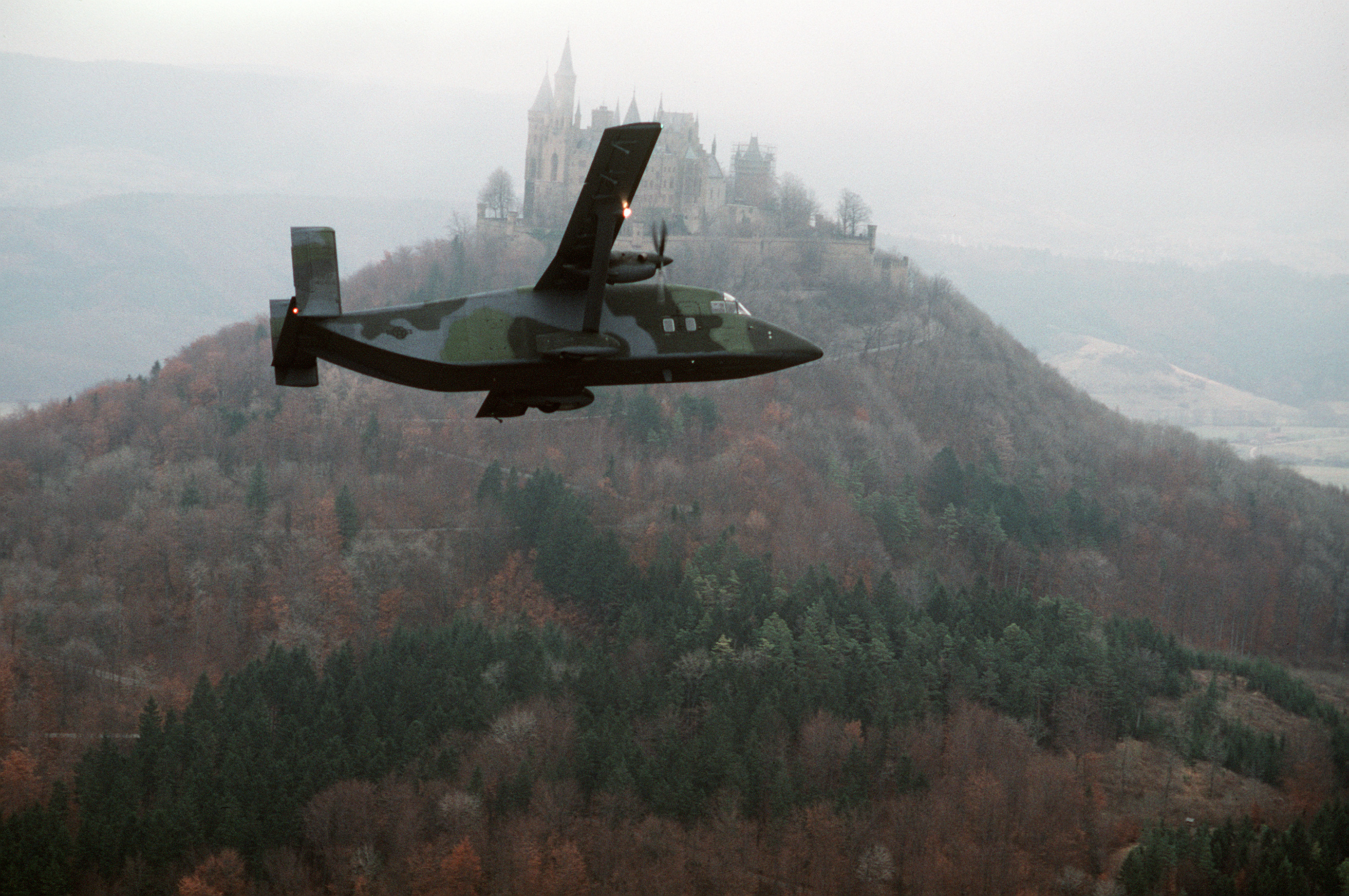
C-23A over the Rhine Valley

The 608th Military Airlift Support Squadron was reactivated in 1977 to operate the Military Airlift Command (MAC) aerial port at Ramstein Air Base. It serviced transient C-5 Galaxy and C-17 Globemaster transports at Ramstein, loading and unloading cargo and also received airlifted equipment and personnel for United States Army Europe (USAREUR) forces units in Germany.

In August 1983, the squadron was replaced by the 608th Military Airlift Group, which was assigned aerial port and maintenance squadrons to carry out its mission. It was also assigned a flying squadron, the 58th Military Airlift Squadron, which was transferred from the 322d Airlift Division. The 10th Military Airlift Squadron at Zweibrücken Air Base which operated C-23 Sherpa transports in support of USAFE's European Distribution System (EDS) was also reassigned from the 322d Airlift Division in 1984. The EDS was organized to give units in Europe a quicker way to receive small equipment items or supplies on a round-the-clock basis, without the expense of the larger cargo aircraft. The group also supported special air transportation of HQ USAFE executives with a fleet of light transports. The 10th was inactivated in 1991.

in 1992, USAF embarked on a major reorganization of its Major Commands. In this reorganization, theater airlift was reassigned from the inactivating MAC. The host 86th Fighter Wing at Ramstein became the 86th Wing and the 58th was redesignated the 58th Airlift Squadron and assigned to the wing's 86th Operations Group. The 608th's mission became strategic airlift support once again as it was redesignated the 608th Airlift Support Group of Air Mobility Command (AMC). However, its mission expanded to include support for all of Europe and it was assigned squadrons at Torrejon Air Base, Spain, and RAF Mildenhall, England. In recognition of its responsibility to support not only airlift, but the air refueling mission of AMC, it became the 621st Air Mobility Support Group in 1994 and was renumbered the because USAF policy required subordinate support units numbers to reflect their parent organization's number and the group was assigned to Twenty-First Air Force. It became the 721st Air Mobility Operations Group in 2001.

The group's Detachment 5 was located at Balad Air Base with a mission to recover and launch AMC aircraft transiting Balad, minimizing ground time to reduce exposure to enemy attacks, In 2008, AMC activated the 521st Air Mobility Operations Wing at Ramstein. The 521st assumed the theater air mobility support mission and the squadrons of the 721st located away from Ramstein were reassigned to it,

== Lineage ==
- Constituted as the 608th Military Airlift Group on 1 July 1983

Activated on 1 August 1983 (Note: Although the 608th Military Airlift Support Squadron was simultaneously inactivated at Ramstein Air Base, the two units are not related for lineage.)
Redesignated 608th Airlift Support Group on 1 June 1992
Redesignated 621st Air Mobility Support Group on 1 July 1994
Redesignated 721st Air Mobility Operations Group on 15 March 2001

=== Assignments ===
- 322d Airlift Division, 1 August 1983
- Twenty-First Air Force (later 21st Expeditionary Mobility Task Force), 1 March 1992
- 521st Air Mobility Operations Wing, 1 September 2008 – present

=== Stations ===
- Ramstein Air Base, West Germany (later Germany), 1 August 1983 – present

=== Subordinate Units ===
- 10th Military Airlift Squadron, 15 March 1984 – 31 March 1991
- 58th Military Airlift Squadron, 1 August 1983 – 1 June 1992
- 608th Aerial Port Squadron, 1 August 1983 – 1 July 1992
- 608th Consolidated Aircraft Maintenance Squadron (later 608th Maintenance Squadron), 1 August 1983 – 1 July 1994
- 623d Air Mobility Support Squadron (later 623d Air Mobility Operations Squadron, 723d Air Mobility Squadron), 1 July 1994 – present
- 625th Airlift Support Squadron (later 625th Air Mobility Support Squadron, 725th Air Mobility Squadron), 1 June 1992 – 1 September 2008

Located at Torrejon Air Base, Spain. Moved to Naval Station Rota Spain

- 627th Airlift Support Squadron (later 627th Air Mobility Support Squadron, 627th Air Mobility Operations Squadron, 727th Air Mobility Squadron), 1 August 1993 – 1 September 2008

Located at RAF Mildenhall, England

- 779th Expeditionary Airlift Squadron unknown date (c.2002?) – inactivated 15 April 2006

Ramstein Air Base, Germany

=== Aircraft ===
- C-12F, 1983–1992
- C-21, 1983–1992
- C-20, 1983–1992
- C-23A, 1983–1992
- C-135, 1983–1992

=== Awards and campaigns ===
Award streamer	Award	Dates	Notes
	Air Force Outstanding Unit Award	1 August 1983 – 31 July 1985	
	Air Force Outstanding Unit Award	1 April 1992 – 31 March 1994	
	Air Force Outstanding Unit Award	1 January 2003 – 30 September 2004	
	Air Force Outstanding Unit Award	1 October 2005 – 30 September 2006	
	Air Force Outstanding Unit Award	1 October 2006 – 30 September 2007	
	Air Force Outstanding Unit Award	1 October 2007 – 30 September 2008	
	Air Force Outstanding Unit Award	1 October 2008 – 30 September 2009	
