= 521st Air Mobility Operations Group =

United States Air Force military unit in Spain

521st Air Mobility Operations Group

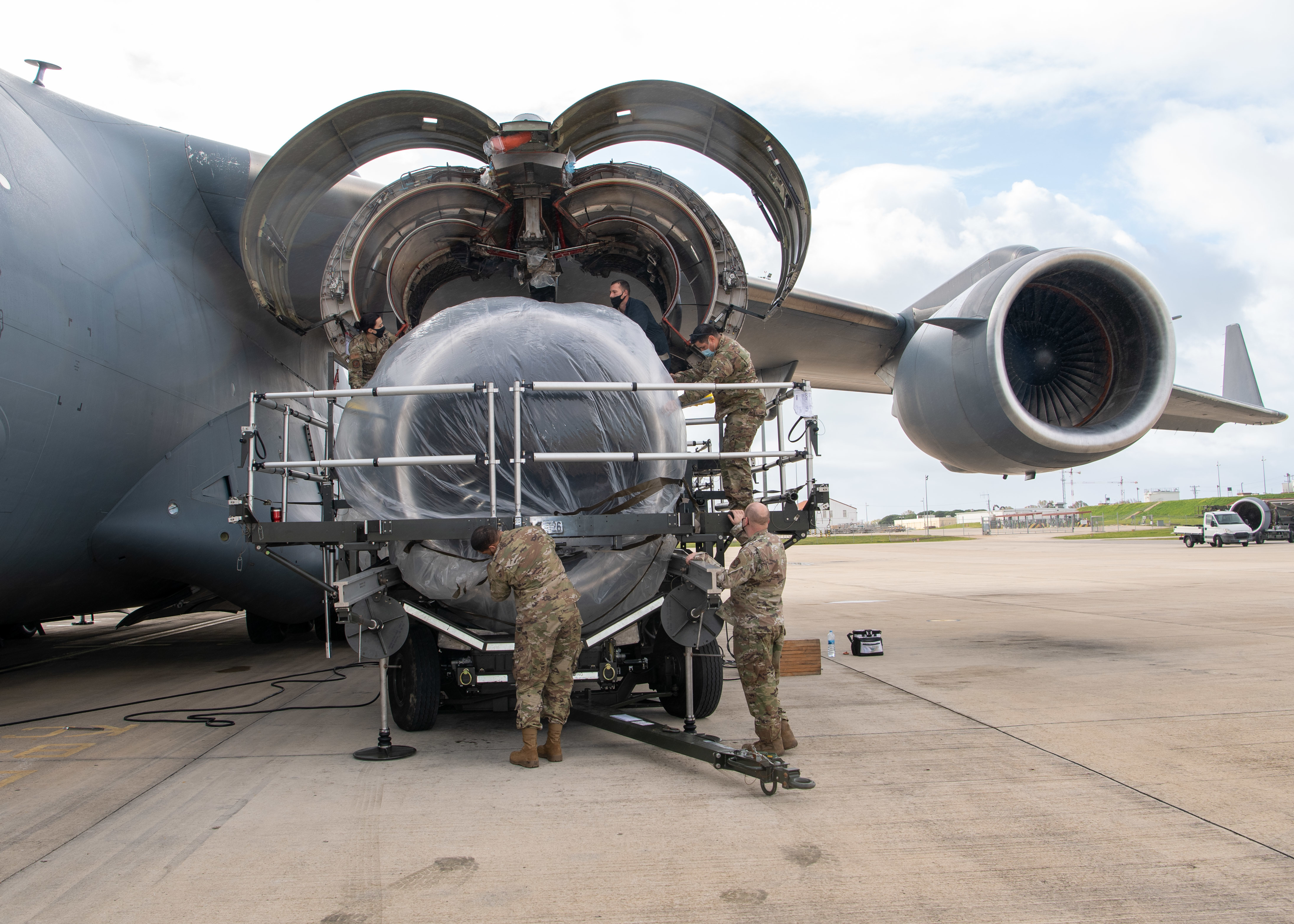
- Airmen of the Group's 725th Air Mobility Squadron perform an engine swap on a C-17 Globemaster III at Naval Station Rota, Spain in 2021
- Active: 4 September 2008 – present
- Country: United States
- Branch: United States Air Force
- Type: Airlift support
- Part of: Air Mobility Command: United States Air Force Expeditionary Center; 521st Air Mobility Operations Wing
- Garrison/HQ: Naval Station Rota, Spain
- Engagements: Global war on terrorism

- Decorations: Air Force Meritorious Unit Award (x7) Air Force Outstanding Unit Award (x2)

Insignia
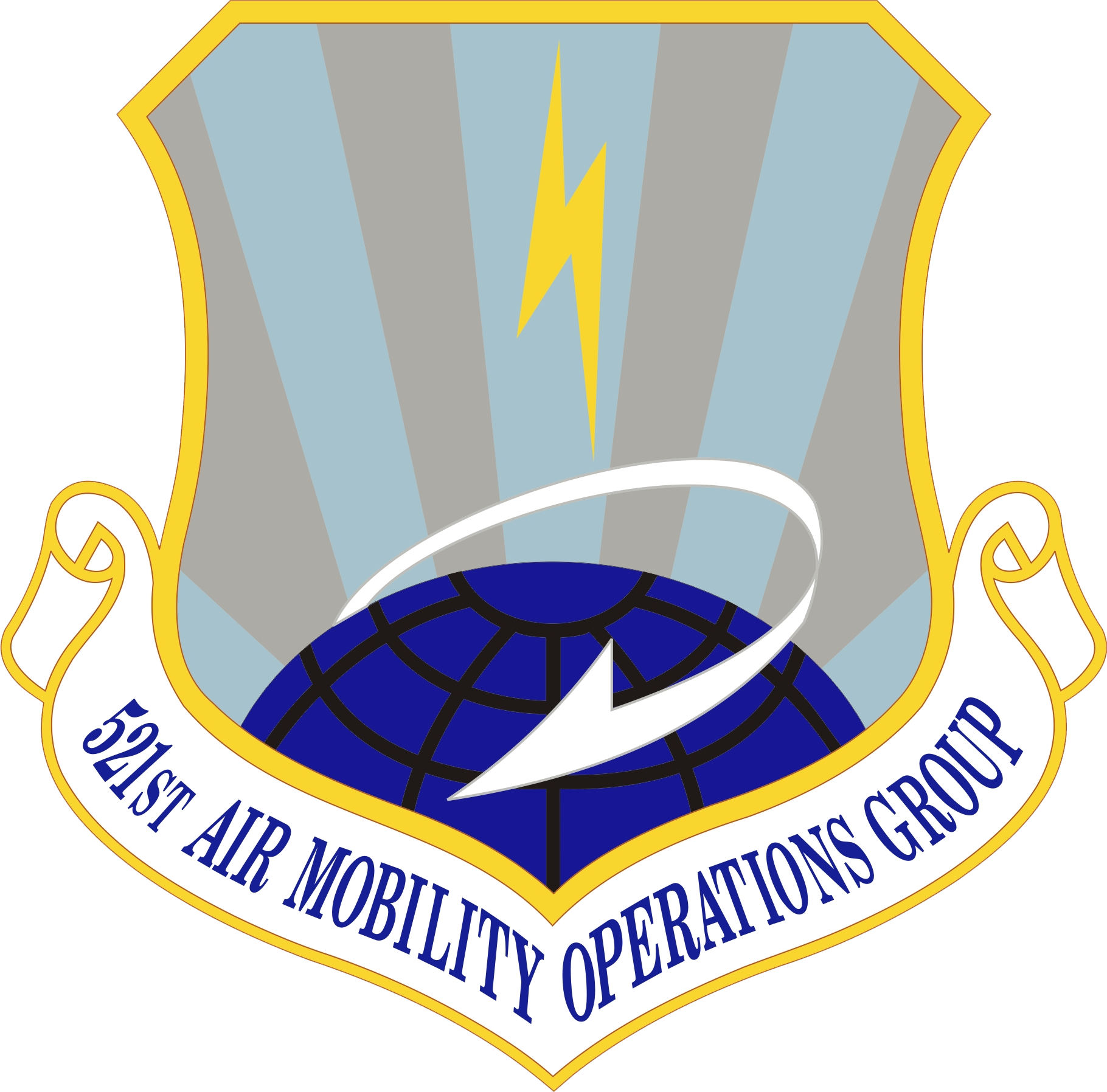
- 521st Air Mobility Operations Group emblem (Approved 3 December 2008)

The 521st Air Mobility Operations Group (521 AMOG) is a United States Air Force Air Mobility Command (AMC) unit stationed at Naval Station Rota, Spain. The 521st AMOG is subordinate to the 521st Air Mobility Operations Wing at Ramstein Air Base, Germany. The group and its subordinate units provide en route support for transient aircraft as part of its parent wing.

== Assigned units ==
- 5th Expeditionary Air Mobility Squadron (5 EAMS) (Cargo City, Kuwait)
- 8th Expeditionary Air Mobility Squadron (8 EAMS) (Al Udeid Air Base, Qatar)
- 725th Air Mobility Squadron (725 AMS) (Naval Station Rota, Spain)
- 728th Air Mobility Squadron (728 AMS) (Incirlik Air Base, Turkey)

== Lineage ==
- Constituted as the 521st Air Mobility Operations Group on 19 August 2008

Activated on 4 September 2008

=== Assignments ===
- 521st Air Mobility Operations Wing, 4 September 2008 – present

=== Stations ===
- Naval Station Rota, Spain, 4 September 2008 – present
