= 424th Tactical Air Support Training Squadron =

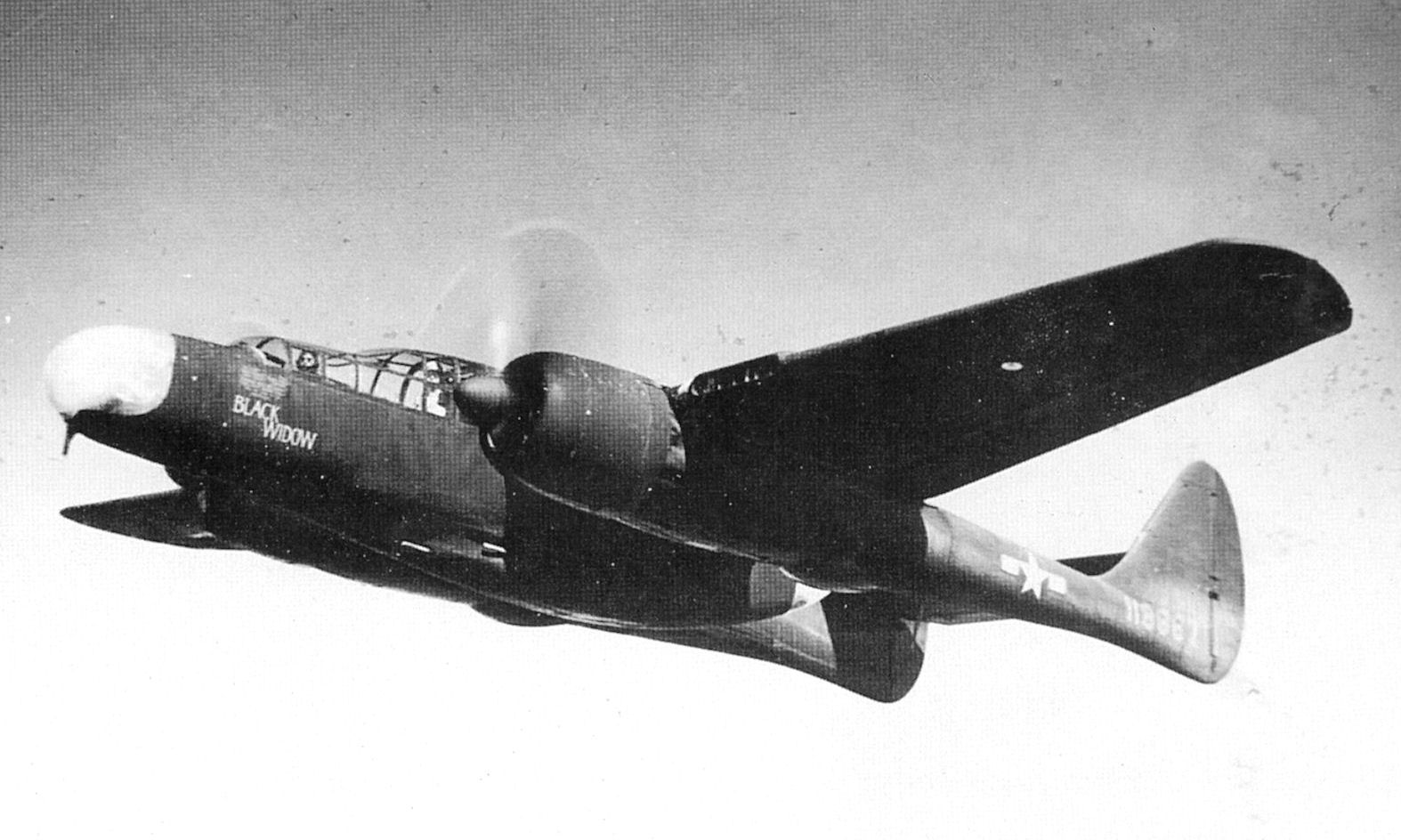
- 424th Night Fighter Squadron YP-61 Black Widow
- Active: 1943–1944
- Country: United States
- Branch: United States Air Force
- Type: Replacement Training Unit
- Role: Night fighter training
- Engagements: World War II American Campaign

The 424th Tactical Air Support Training Squadron is an inactive United States Air Force unit. Its last assignment was with the 68th Tactical Air Support Group at Eglin Air Force Base, Florida, where the unit was inactivated on 31 October 1972. The unit conducted crew training for special operations, then forward air control from 1970 through 1972.

The unit was first activated as the 424th Night Fighter Squadron. The squadron was one of the first dedicated night fighter Replacement Training Units of the Army Air Forces. It trained replacement night fighter pilots who were then deployed overseas into combat until its inactivation in March 1944 due to a reorganization of Army Air Forces training units.

== History ==
=== World War II ===
The squadron was activated on 24 November 1943 at Orlando Army Air Base, Florida as the fourth night fighter training squadron of the 481st Night Fighter Operational Training Group. Its mission was to be a Replacement Training Unit (RTU) for Night Fighter pilots. It accepted Army Air Forces Training Command's twin-engine flying training and North American B-25 Mitchell transition school graduates and trained them as night fighter pilots. It was initially equipped with Douglas DB-7s and Douglas P-70s.

As 1943 progressed additional aircraft and equipment arrived and the program expanded. In September, the first American-built dedicated night fighter began to arrive, the Northrop YP-61 Black Widow and a few production P-61As. In January 1944 the entire program moved to Hammer Field, California and was placed under IV Fighter Command. The move placed the squadron near Northrop manufacturing facility at Hawthorne, California and most programmed P-61 squadrons were planned for operations in the Pacific and China Burma India Theaters.

In March 1944 the 420th was disbanded when the AAF found that standard military units, based on relatively inflexible tables of organization were proving less well adapted to the training mission. Accordingly, a more functional system was adopted in which each base was organized into a separate numbered unit during a reorganization of units in the United States. The squadron's personnel and equipment were transferred to Squadron C of the 450th Army Air Forces Base Unit (Night Fighter Replacement Training Unit).

The squadron was redesignated the 424th Special Operations Training Squadron and activated at Eglin Air Force Base, Florida. It was reassigned to the 68th Tactical Air Support Group in January 1972. After being redesignated the 424th Tactical Air Support Training Squadron in July, it was inactivated on 31 October 1972.

=== Lineage ===
- Constituted as the 424th Night Fighter Squadron on 23 November 1943

Activated on 24 November 1943
Disbanded on 31 March 1944

- Redesignated 424th Special Operations Training Squadron on 9 June 1970

Activated on 1 July 1970
Redesignated 424th Tactical Air Support Training Squadron 15 July 1972
Inactivated 31 Oct 1972

=== Assignments ===
- 481st Night Fighter Operational Training Group, 24 November 1943 – 31 March 1944
- 1st Special Operations Wing 1 July 1970
- 68th Tactical Air Support Group, 1 January 1972 – 31 October 1972

=== Stations ===
- Orlando Army Air Base, Florida, 24 November 1943
- Hammer Field, California, 28 January– 31 March 1944
- Eglin Air Force Base, Florida, 1 July 1970 – 31 October 1972

=== Aircraft Assigned ===
- Douglas P-70 Havoc, 1943–1944
- Northrop P-61 Black Widow, 1944

== See also ==
- Operational - Replacement Training Units
