= 521st Air Mobility Operations Wing =

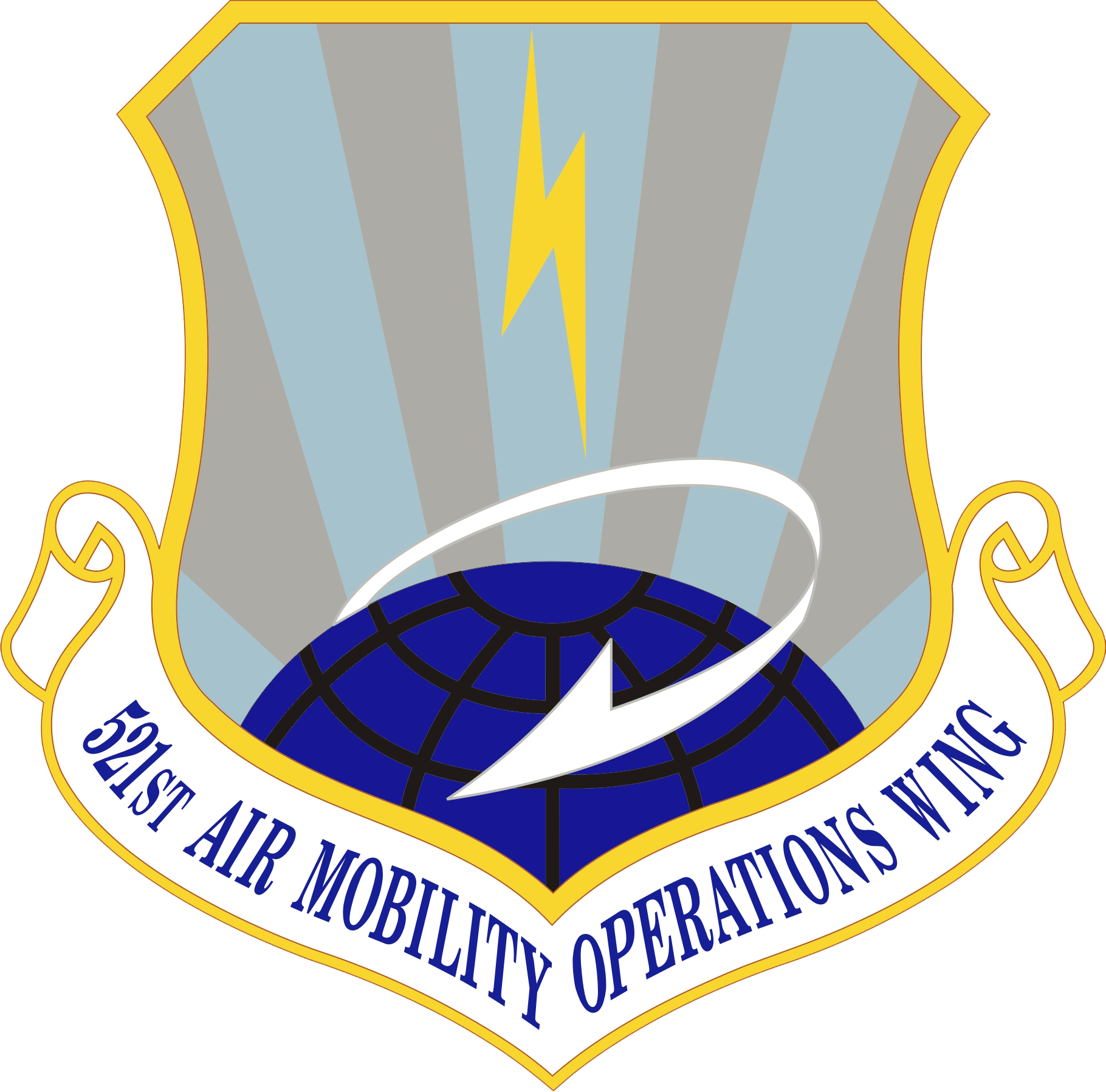
- Wing emblem
- Active: 1942–1947; 1949–1960; 2008 – present
- Country: United States
- Branch: United States Air Force
- Type: Wing
- Role: Air mobility logistics and support
- Size: c. 1,500 personnel
- Part of: Air Mobility Command (United States Air Force Expeditionary Center)
- Base: Ramstein Air Base, Germany
- Motto: Depend on us
- Decorations: Air Force Outstanding Unit Award
- Website: Official website

Commanders
- Current commander: Colonel Angela M. Polsinelli

The 521st Air Mobility Operations Wing is part of Air Mobility Command and is stationed at Ramstein Air Base, Germany. It coordinates logistical air movements into, out of, and through Europe.

The 521st AMOW expedites warfighting and humanitarian efforts by the United States Air Force throughout Europe, the Middle East, and Africa. It provides all command and control, en route maintenance support, aeromedical evacuation and air transportation services for air mobility operations in its area of responsibility. It performs this through aircraft maintenance units, maintenance operations centers, quality assurance, regional training center, fuel cell, aerospace ground equipment, forward supply location, and maintenance recovery teams. It operates air terminal operations centers, providing passenger and fleet services, cargo processing, special handling, ramp services, and load planning.

The Wing is composed of two groups. These groups are assigned nine squadrons and fourteen other geographically separated units.

== History ==
The wing was originally constituted as the 555th Signal Aircraft Warning Battalion. The unit served as an aircraft warning unit in defense of the continental United States from 1942 to 1943. The battalion moved to England in 1944 where it provided communications support until the day after the Normandy landings when it moved to support the invading forces in France. It moved frequently to support elements of Ninth Air Force, arriving in Belgium in September and Germany in March 1945. It continued it mission during the occupation of Germany from 1945. At the end of 1945, the battalion was converted to an Air Corps unit, redesignated the 501st Tactical Control Group and its component companies replaced by Aircraft Control and Warning Squadrons. It provided radar coverage and navigational aid to allied aircraft flying over the U.S. Zone of Occupied Germany in 1946 and 1947. It was inactivated in 1947.

The unit was reactivated as the 501st Aircraft Control and Warning Group in 1949 to replace the 7402d Aircraft Control and Warning Group. Between 1949 and 1960, it provided tactical control systems, including aircraft control and warning facilities, passive detection devices and guidance units in central Europe. In 1952, it became a tactical control group again. In 1954, the group moved to Landstuhl Air Base. Starting in 1955, it and the 526th Tactical Control Group provided personnel for a provisional Tactical Control Wing, which it replaced as the 501st Tactical Control Wing in 1957 to provide radar and aircraft control for all of Twelfth Air Force. It operated the Tactical Control System to exercise operational control of offensive and defensive units in Europe. In the 1960s, its mission, personnel, and equipment were combined with those of the 86th Fighter-Interceptor Wing, which was redesignated the 86th Air Division (Defense).

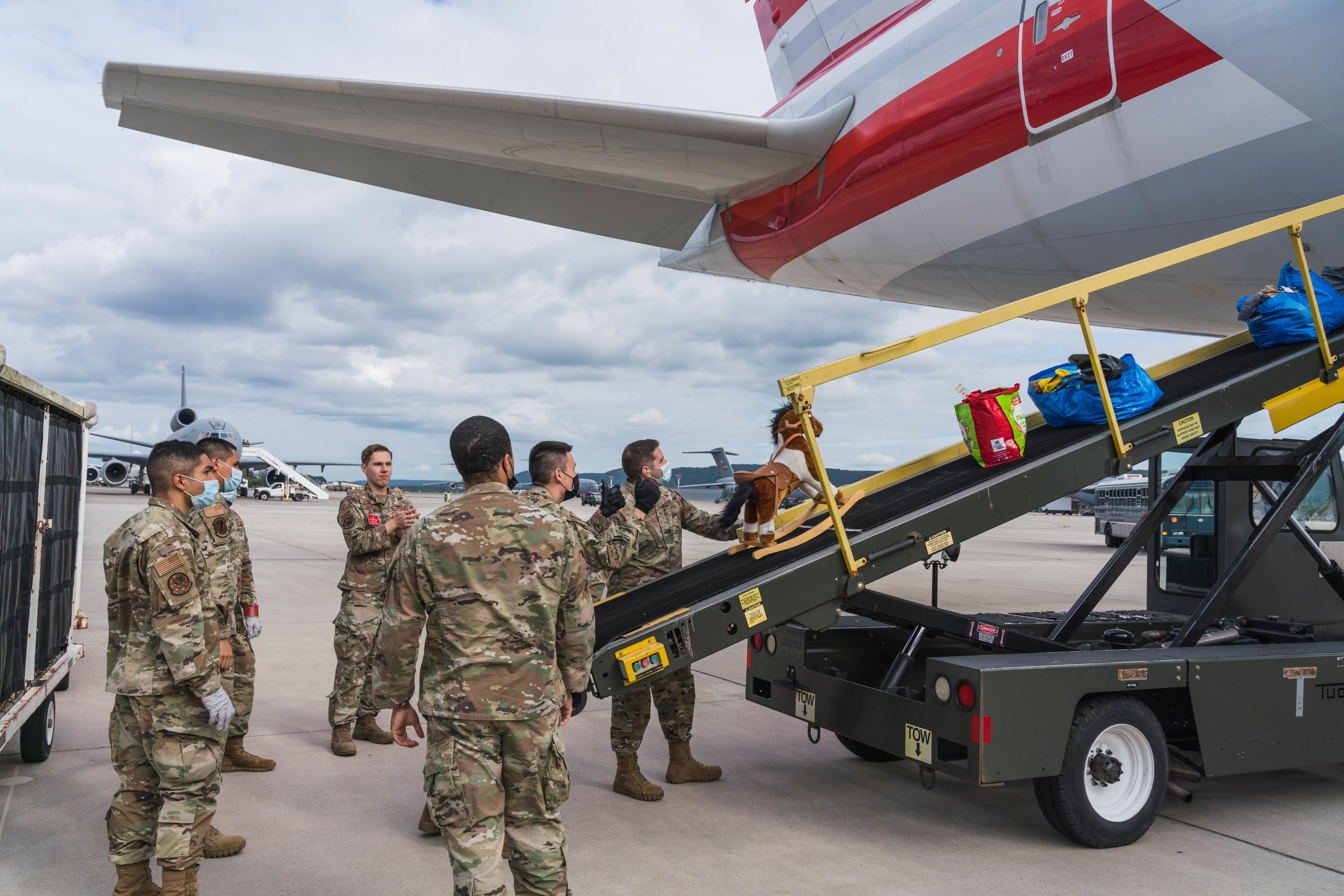
Members of the wing's 721st Aerial Port Squadron load luggage onto an aircraft at Ramstein Air Base, Germany during Operation Allies Refuge in 2021

Today the two subordinate groups include:

- The 521st Air Mobility Operations Group (Naval Station Rota, Spain)
  - 724th Air Mobility Squadron (Aviano AB, Italy)
  - 725th Air Mobility Squadron (Naval Station Rota, Spain)
  - 728th Air Mobility Squadron (Incirlik Air Base, Turkey)
  - 8th Expeditionary Air Mobility Squadron
- The 721st Air Mobility Operations Group (Ramstein AB, Germany)
  - 721st Aerial Port Squadron
  - 721st Mobility Support Squadron
  - 721st Aircraft Maintenance Squadron
  - 726th Air Mobility Squadron (Spangdahlem AB, Germany)
  - 727th Air Mobility Squadron (RAF Mildenhall, United Kingdom)

== Lineage ==
- Constituted as the 555th Signal Aircraft Warning Battalion (Separate) on 28 February 1942

Activated on 4 July 1942
Redesignated 555th Signal Aircraft Warning Battalion on 11 March 1943
Converted from the Signal Corps to the Air Corps and redesignated 501st Tactical Control Group on 31 December 1945
Inactivated on 25 September 1947

- Redesignated 501st Aircraft Control and Warning Group on 11 May 1949

Activated on 10 June 1949
Redesignated 501st Tactical Control Group on 16 March 1952
Redesignated 501st Tactical Control Wing on 18 December 1957
Inactivated on 18 November 1960

- Redesignated 521st Tactical Control Wing 31 July 1985 (remained inactive)
- Redesignated 521st Air Mobility Operations Wing on 18 August 2008

Activated on 4 September 2008

=== Assignments ===
- III Fighter Command, 4 July 1942
- Aircraft Warning Unit Training Center, 8 October 1942
- 70th Fighter Wing, December 1943
- IX Tactical Air Command, 13 September 1944
- 70th Fighter Wing, 22 February 1945
- XXIX Tactical Air Command, 19 July 1945
- 70th Fighter Wing, 6 August 1945
- XII Tactical Air Command, 15 November 1945
- 51st Troop Carrier Wing, 25 July 1947 – 25 September 1947
- United States Air Forces in Europe, 10 June 1949
- 2d Air Division, 10 October 1949
- Twelfth Air Force, 1 August 1951
- United States Air Forces in Europe, 1 January 1957
- Seventeenth Air Force, 15 November 1959 – 18 November 1960
- 21st Expeditionary Mobility Task Force, 4 September 2008
- United States Air Force Expeditionary Center, 19 March 2012 – present

=== Stations ===
- Drew Field, Florida, 4 July 1942
- Camp Myles Standish, Massachusetts, 20 November 1943 – 28 December 1943 (Port of Embarkation)
- Popham Airfield, England, 7 January 1944
- RAF Boxted (Station 150), England, 2 February 1944
- RAF Ibsley (Station 347), England, 18 April 1944
- Plymouth, England, 19 May 1944 – 6 June 1944
- Vierville-sur-Mer, France, 7 June 1944
- Cricqueville-en-Bessin (A-2), France, 2 July 1944
- Villedieu-les-Poêles, France, 5 August 1944
- Le Teilleul, France, 14 August 1944
- Aillieres, France, 23 August 1944
- Les Loges-en-Josas, France, 31 August 1944
- Paris, France, 4 September 1944
- Ham-sur-Heure-Nalinnes, Belgium, 16 September 1944
- Verviers, Belgium, 26 September 1944
- Gosselies (A-87), Belgium, 18 December 1944
- Verviers, Belgium, 7 January 1945
- Brühl, Germany, 23 March 1945
- Bad Wildungen, Germany, 11 April 1945
- Göttingen, Germany, 12 April 1945
- Nohra, Germany, 26 April 1945
- Fritzlar (Y-86), Germany, 25 June 1945
- Fürstenfeldbruck Air Base (R-72), Germany, 19 July 1945
- Bad Kissingen, Germany, 3 February 1946
- Wiesbaden Air Base (Y-80), 5 July 1947 – 25 September 1947
- Zwingenberg, Germany, 10 June 1949
- Landsberg Air Base (R-54), Germany, 17 July 1945
- Kaiserslautern, Germany, 23 September 1952
- Landstuhl AB (later Ramstein-Landstuhl AB, Ramstein AB, Germany, 17 November 1954 – 18 November 1960
- Ramstein Air Base, Germany, 4 September 2008 – present

=== Components ===
Groups

- 521st Air Mobility Operations Group, 4 September 2008 – present
- 721st Air Mobility Operations Group, 4 September 2008 – present

Squadrons

- 3d SHORAN Beacon Squadron, 18 December 1957 – 1 May 1958

Bremerhaven, Germany

- 6th SHORAN Beacon Squadron, 18 December 1957 – 1 May 1958
- 601st Tactical Control Squadron (Formed from Company A, 555th Signal Aircraft Warning Battalion, later 601st Aircraft Control & Warning Squadron), 31 December 1945 – 25 September 1947, 10 June 1949 – 18 November 1960 (detached to Tactical Control Wing, Provisional 1955–1957)

Rothwesten AB, Germany

- 602d Tactical Control Squadron (Formed from Company B, 555th Signal Aircraft Warning Battalion, later 602d Aircraft Control & Warning Squadron), 31 December 1945 – 25 September 1947, 10 June 1949 – 18 November 1960 (detached to Tactical Control Wing, Provisional 1955–1957)

Giebelstadt AB, Germany

- 603d Aircraft Control & Warning Squadron (Formed from Company C, 555th Signal Aircraft Warning Battalion, later 603d Tactical Control Squadron, 603d Aircraft Control & Warning Squadron), 31 December 1945 – 25 September 1947, 10 June 1949 – 18 November 1960 (detached to Tactical Control Wing, Provisional 1955–1957)

Langerkopf, Germany

- 604th Tactical Control Squadron (Formed from Company D, 555th Signal Aircraft Warning Battalion, later 604th Aircraft Control & Warning Squadron), 31 December 1945 – 25 September 1947, 10 June 1949 – 18 November 1960 (detached to Tactical Control Wing, Provisional 1955–1957)

Freising AB, Germany

- 615th Aircraft Control & Warning Squadron, Fixed, 18 December 1957 – 18 November 1960

Schonfeld, Germany

- 616th Aircraft Control & Warning Squadron, 18 December 1957 – 18 November 1960

Ulm, Germany; Turkheim, Germany

- 619th Tactical Control Squadron, 18 December 1957 – 18 January 1959

Birkenfeld, Germany

- 807th Tactical Control Squadron, 1 August 1951 – 18 November 1960

=== Awards ===
- Air Force Outstanding Unit Award

1 October 2008 – 30 September 2009

- American Theater of World War II
- European theater of World War II
- Campaigns:

Normandy
Northern France
Ardennes-Alsace

Central Europe
Rhineland

- World War II Army of Occupation

== See also ==
- List of wings of the United States Air Force

== Bibliography ==
- Anderson, Capt. Barry (1985). Army Air Forces Stations: A Guide to the Stations Where U.S. Army Air Forces Personnel Served in the United Kingdom During World War II (PDF). Maxwell AFB, AL: Research Division, USAF Historical Research Center. Archived from the original (PDF) on 4 March 2016. (for designation of airfields in the United Kingdom)
- Johnson, 1st Lt. David C. (1988). U.S. Army Air Forces Continental Airfields (ETO) D-Day to V-E Day (PDF). Maxwell AFB, AL: Research Division, USAF Historical Research Center. Archived from the original (PDF) on 17 September 2016. (for designation of airfields in France, Belgium, and Germany)
- Ravenstein, Charles A. (1984). Air Force Combat Wings, Lineage & Honors Histories 1947–1977. Washington, DC: Office of Air Force History. ISBN 0-912799-12-9. (86th Air Division organization)
