= EASO Choir =

Spanish choir

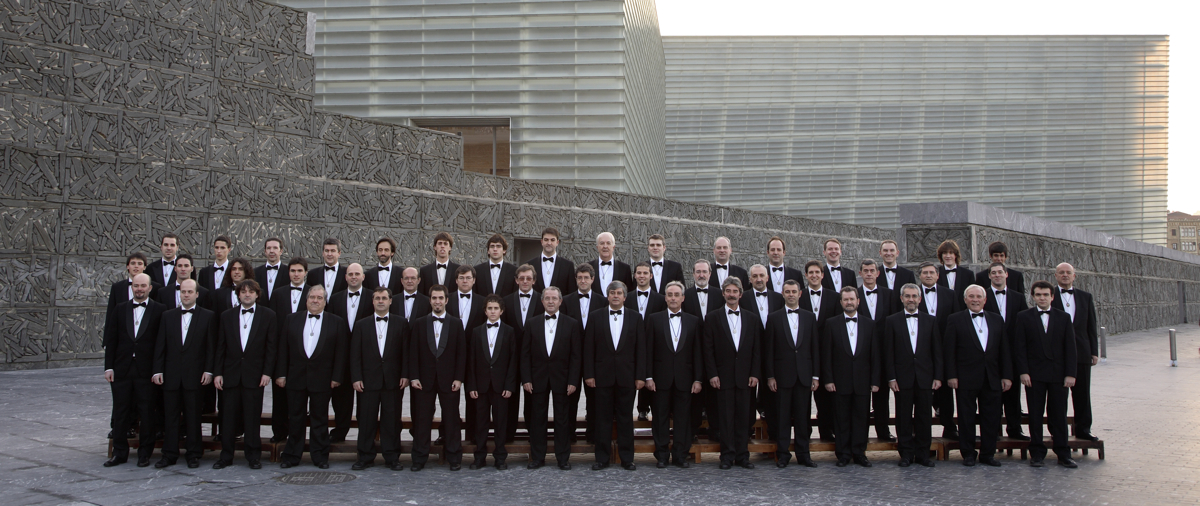
- EASO Choir in 2009

Background information
- Origin: San Sebastián, Spain
- Genre: Men's choir
- Years active: 1940–present
- Members: 50 voices
- Website: coroeaso.com

The EASO Choir is a Spanish choir founded in 1940 in San Sebastián. It was founded as a choral group for lower-range male voices, to spread the knowledge of Basque popular music, has attained prestige in its interpretation of a wide range of choral song.

After sixty years of uninterrupted activity – while maintaining its amateur status – the group is involved with its continuing musical and choral formation.

== Career ==
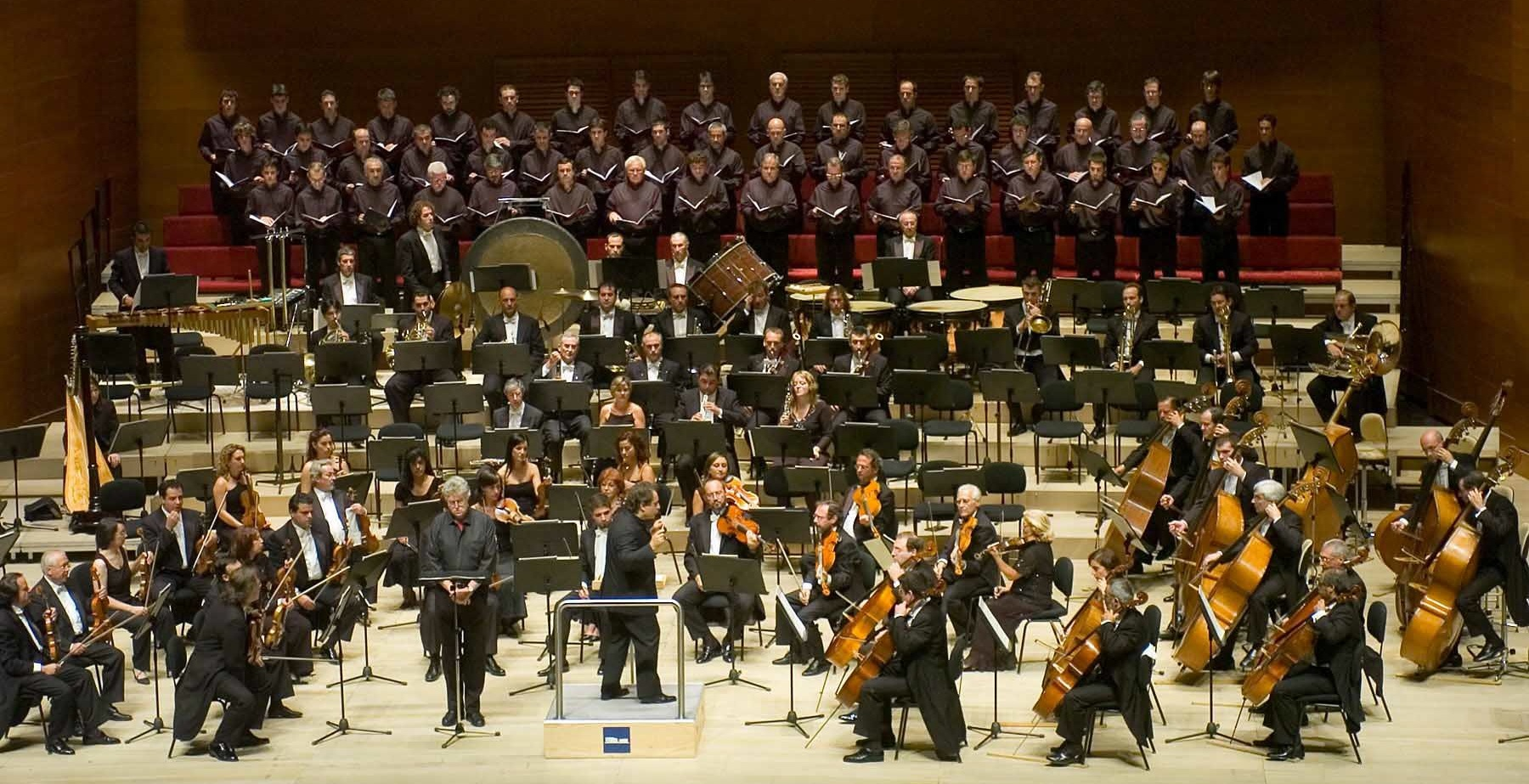
A Survivor in Warsaw, National Orchestra of Spain, Dir. Josep Pons (auditorium Kursaal)

Its career began by taking part in important international contests such as Llangolem (Britain), Lille (France) and twice in Arezzo (Italy), being awarded the first prize in all of them. Thanks to this initial success, it has been given several awards so far.

It has been invited to theatres all over the world: Teatro Real in Madrid, Palau in Barcelona, Herkulessaal in Munich, Pleyel in Paris, Palais Royal in Monaco, Théâtre Royal in Brussels, Teatro Colón in Buenos Aires, Palacio de Bellas Artes in Mexico, Bartlesville's Auditorium (United States), Berlin's Philharmonie, Alexandrinsky Theatre and Hermitage in Saint Petersburg.

The choir has worked with these orchestras: Spain's National, French's National, London's Philharmonic, Portugal's Gulbenkian, Bordeaux's Philharmonic, Radio Televisión Española, Paris's Opera, Toulouse Capitole Orchestra, I Solisti in New York, Galicia's Symphonic, Euskadi's Symphonic.

It has performed with soloists such as Aldo Baldin, Christa Ludwig, Thomas Moser, Rockwell Blake, William Matteuzzi, Elena Prokina, Aquiles Machado, Alexandru Agache, Simone Alaimo, Martine Dupuy, Albert Dohmen, Eva Johanson, Galina Gorbachova, Andreas Schimdt, Wolfgang Schmidt, Dolora Zajick.

It has been conducted by Igor Stravinsky, Serge Baudo, Sylvain Cambreling, Marek Janowski, Kurt Wöss, Bruno Campanella, Ransom Wilson, David Parry, Leopold Hager, Jesús López-Cobos, Josep Pons, Arturo Tamayo, Juan Jose Mena, Victor Pablo Perez, Günter Neuhold, Tugan Sokhiev.
