= BAM B26 =

BAM XS-B26
- Type: Air Rifle
- Place of origin: China

Production history
- Manufacturer: Xisico

Specifications
- Mass: 7.3 lb (3.3 kg)
- Length: 43 in (1,092.2 mm)
- Barrel length: 16 in (406.4 mm)
- Cartridge: .177; .22
- Barrels: 1
- Action: Break Barrel, spring loaded, piston driven
- Muzzle velocity: 800 ft/s (240 m/s) with 7.9gr pellet, 650 ft/s (200 m/s) with 14.3gr pellet
- Sights: TRUGLO Fiber Optic Sights, 11mm dovetail for scopes

The BAM XS-B26 is a Chinese copy of the Beeman R9. It is available in two calibers: .177 and .22. It is a break barrel type air rifle.

The 26 in B26 is for 26 mm chamber, but it never went into production at 26 mm. It has a 25 mm chamber. The Beeman R9 has 26 mm, where the B26 does not have the 26 mm chamber.

Now Bam B26 is 26 mm chamber.
