= 85th Expeditionary Air Support Operations Squadron =

The 85th Expeditionary Air Support Operations Squadron is a provisional United States Air Force unit.

== History ==
It was constituted as the 85th Tactical Control Flight on 7 February 1977, and activated on 1 March of that year with the 602nd Tactical Air Control Wing at Luke Air Force Base. The flight was inactivated there on 1 July 1983. It was redesignated as the 85th Expeditionary Air Support Operations Squadron on 12 February 2009 and simultaneously converted to provisional status. Assigned to Air Combat Command, the squadron is to activate or inactivate as needed.
