= 1st Air Support Operations Squadron =

United States Air Force squadron

1st Air Support Operations Squadron

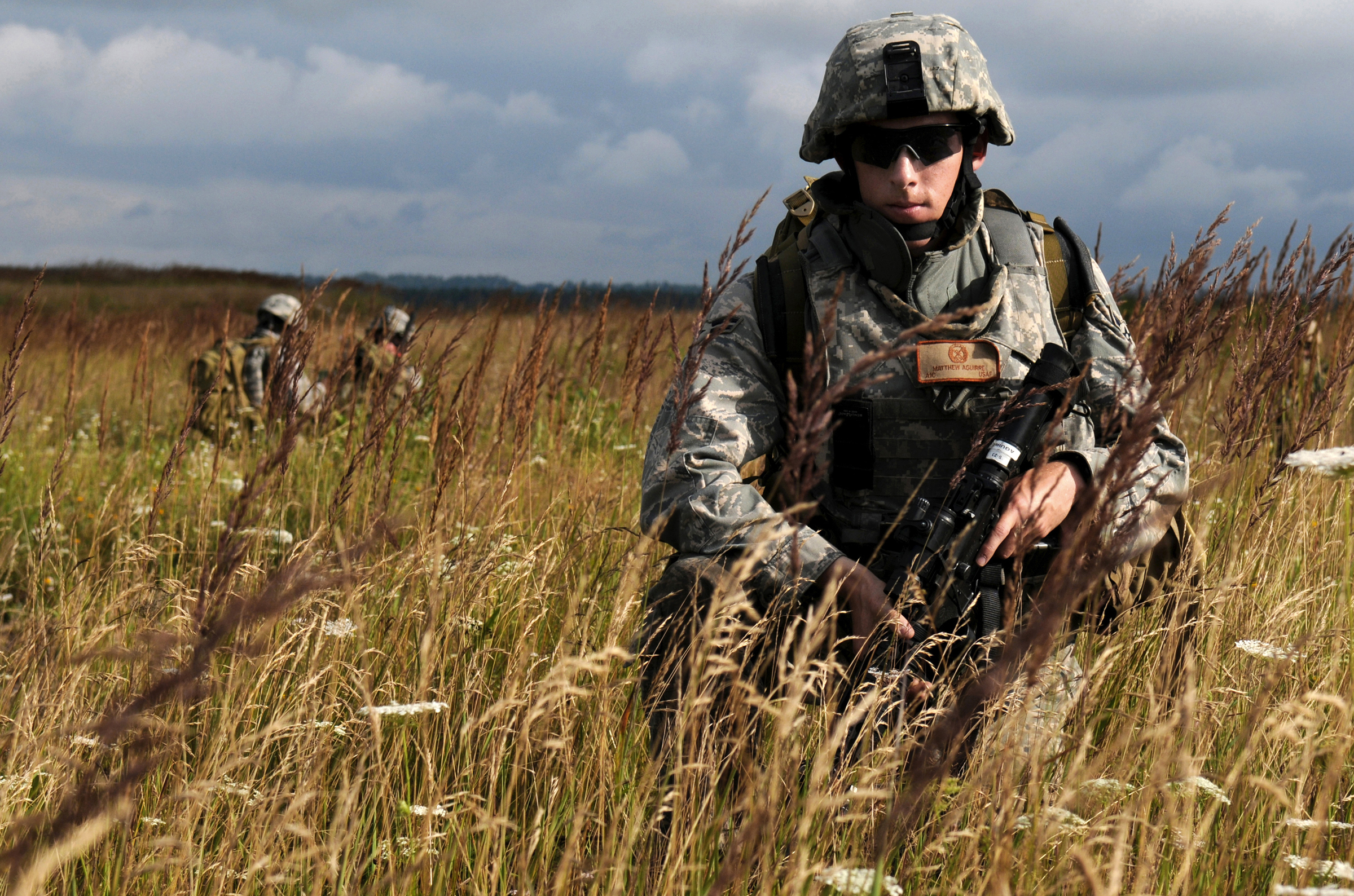
- Tactical Air Control Party airman from the 1st Air Support Operations Squadron secures a position during Exercise Allied Strike at Grafenwöhr, Germany
- Active: 1996–2011; 2023(?)–present
- Country: United States
- Branch: United States Air Force
- Role: Air Support Operations
- Part of: United States Air Forces Europe
- Garrison/HQ: Mihail Kogălniceanu, Romania
- Nickname(s): Reapers
- Engagements: Iraq War
- Decorations: Air Force Outstanding Unit Award

Insignia
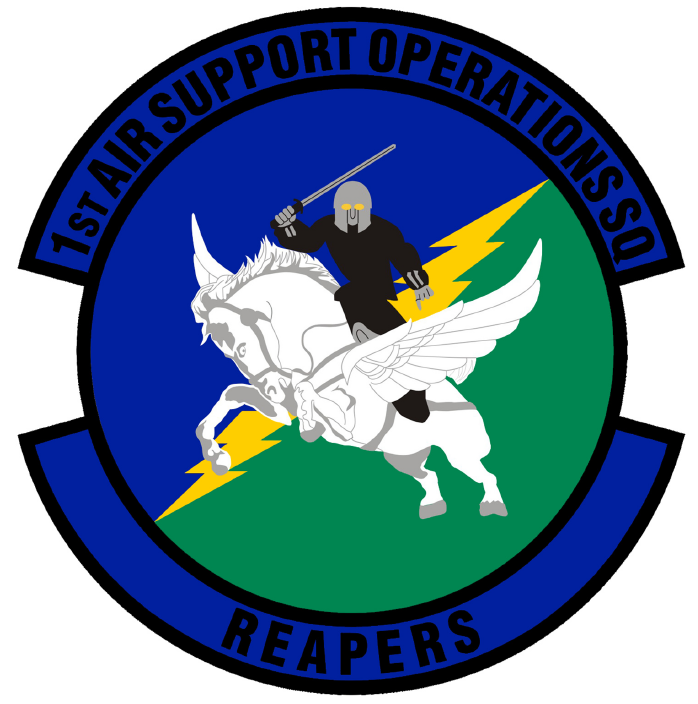
- 1st Air Support Operations Squadron emblem (approved 28 November 2000)

The United States Air Force's 1st Expeditionary Air Support Operations Squadron is a combat support unit located at Mihail Kogălniceanu, Romania as of 2024. It was previously located at Wiesbaden, Germany between 2001 and 2011.

== Mission ==
The squadron provided tactical command and control of airpower assets to the Joint Forces Air Component Commander and Joint Forces Land Component Commander for combat operations.

== History ==
The squadron was constituted on 1 September 1996 and activated at Bad Kreuznach, Germany on 30 September 1996. On 31 July 2001, it was relocated to Wiesbaden Army Air Field where it remained active until 2011. In March 2011, when the 1st Armored Division was relocated back to the United States, the squadron was inactivated and the remaining mission was taken over by the 4th Air Support Operations Group.

In a response to the Russian invasion of Ukraine, the 1st Expeditionary Air Support Operations Squadron (1st EASOS) was established circa 2023 from members across the Tactical Air Control Party. The role of the squadron is to participate in allied and partner nation exercises and ensure air-ground coordination during expeditionary deployments to deter enemy aggression. As of 2024, the 1st EASOS is deployed to the Mihail Kogălniceanu Air Base in Romania.

=== Lineage and assignments ===
Date	Designation	Assignment	Station	Notes
1 September 1996	1 Air Support Operations Squadron	inactive		
30 September 1996	1 Air Support Operations Squadron	4th Air Support Operations Group	Bad Kreuznach, Germany	
31 July 2001	1 Air Support Operations Squadron	4th Air Support Operations Group	Wiesbaden Army Air Field	
1 October 2011	1 Air Support Operations Squadron	inactive		

=== Awards and campaigns ===
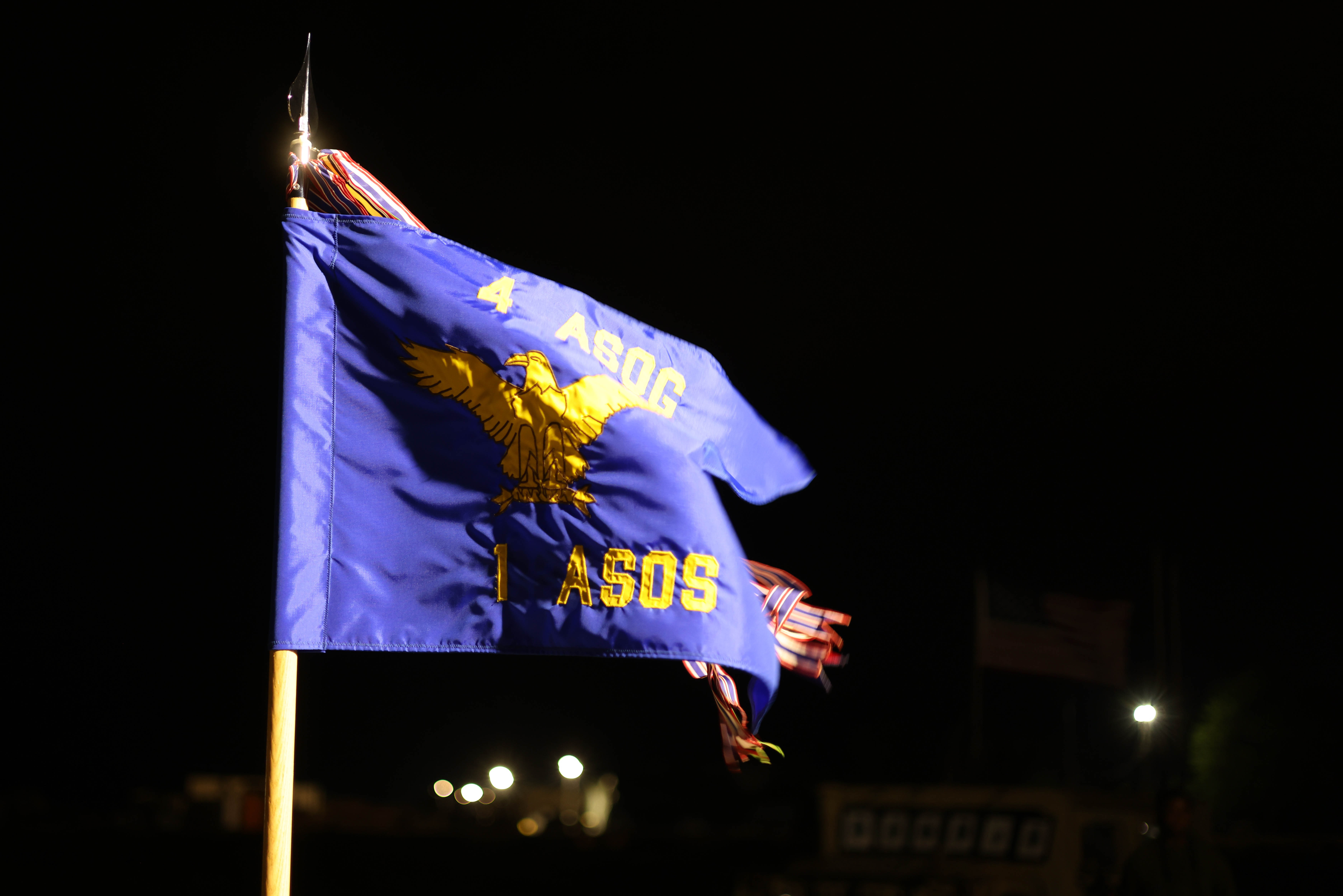
The unit guidon displaying the award and campaign streamers

Award streamer	Award	Dates	Notes
	Air Force Outstanding Unit Award	30 September 1996-30 June 1997	1st Air Support Operations Squadron
	Air Force Outstanding Unit Award	1 October 1998-30 September 2000	1st Air Support Operations Squadron
	Air Force Outstanding Unit Award	1 October 2002-30 September 2004	1st Air Support Operations Squadron
	Air Force Outstanding Unit Award	1 January 2006-31 December 2007	1st Air Support Operations Squadron
	Air Force Outstanding Unit Award	1 January 2008-30 June 2009	1st Air Support Operations Squadron
	Air Force Outstanding Unit Award	16 July 2009-31 December 2010	1st Air Support Operations Squadron
	Air Force Outstanding Unit Award	1 January 2011-31 December 2011	1st Air Support Operations Squadron
