= 730th Expeditionary Air Support Operations Squadron =

Provisional United States Air Force squadron

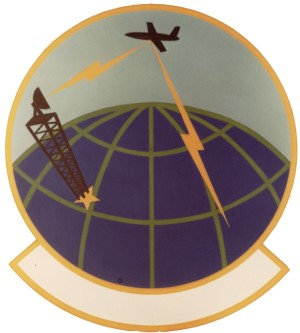
- 730th EASOS emblem
- Active: 1972–1977; 2009–present (provisional)
- Country: United States
- Branch: United States Air Force
- Type: Air support operations squadron
- Role: Expeditionary air support operations
- Size: Squadron
- Part of: Air Combat Command
- Decorations: Air Force Outstanding Unit Award

The 730th Expeditionary Air Support Operations Squadron (730 EASOS) is a provisional United States Air Force unit assigned to Air Combat Command. When activated, the unit provides tactical command and control of air power assets to the Joint Force Air Component Commander and Joint Force Land Component Commander for combat operations.

== History ==
=== 730th Tactical Control Squadron ===
The unit was originally constituted as the 730th Tactical Control Squadron on 7 December 1971 and activated on 1 February 1972 at Eglin Air Force Auxiliary Field #3 (Duke Field), Florida. The squadron was assigned to the 507th Tactical Air Control Group (later redesignated 507th Tactical Air Control Wing) under Ninth Air Force of Tactical Air Command.

During its period of service, the squadron received the Air Force Outstanding Unit Award for the period 16 June 1974 to 15 June 1975. The unit's emblem, featuring a radar globe with aircraft and lightning bolts on an azure and vert disc, was approved on 20 April 1976.

The 730th Tactical Control Squadron was inactivated on 30 June 1977.

=== Redesignation as EASOS ===
The unit was redesignated as the 730th Expeditionary Air Support Operations Squadron and converted to provisional status on 12 February 2009. As a provisional unit, it can be activated or inactivated at any time by Air Combat Command to meet expeditionary requirements.

== Lineage ==
- Constituted as the 730th Tactical Control Squadron on 7 December 1971

Activated on 1 February 1972
Inactivated on 30 June 1977

- Redesignated 730th Expeditionary Air Support Operations Squadron, converted to provisional status, 12 February 2009

=== Assignments ===
- 507th Tactical Air Control Group (later 507th Tactical Air Control Wing), 1 February 1972 – 30 June 1977 (detached, 1 February – 22 June 1972)
- Air Combat Command, to activate or inactivate at any time on or after 12 February 2009

=== Stations ===
- Eglin Air Force Auxiliary Field #3 (Duke Field), Florida, 1 February 1972 – 30 June 1977

=== Decorations ===
- Air Force Outstanding Unit Award: 16 June 1974 – 15 June 1975
