= 84th Expeditionary Air Support Operations Squadron =

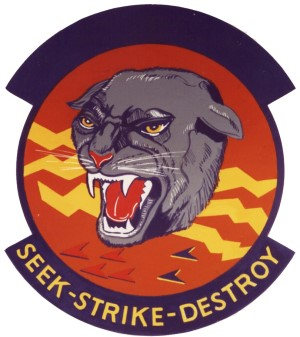
- Active: 1969–1979; 1985–1988
- Country: United States
- Branch: United States Air Force
- Role: Expeditionary Air Support Operations
- Size: Squadron

The 84th Expeditionary Air Support Operations Squadron (84 EASOS) is a provisional United States Air Force unit.

== History ==
The squadron was constituted as the 84th Tactical Air Control Flight on 24 June 1969 and activated on the next day at George Air Force Base with the 4469th Tactical Control Squadron. The flight soon transferred to the 607th Tactical Control Squadron on 15 October of that year, and was awarded the Air Force Outstanding Unit Award for the period between 1 January 1972 and 31 December 1973. After relocating to Luke Air Force Base on 1 January 1976, it transferred to the 602nd Tactical Air Control Wing on 1 March 1977 before inactivation on 1 October 1979. Again activated on 1 October 1985 at the Little Mountain Test Annex of Hill Air Force Base with the 602nd to provide radar surveillance, the 84th was inactivated on 15 June 1988.

It was redesignated as the 84th Expeditionary Air Support Operations Squadron on 12 February 2009 and simultaneously converted to provisional status. Assigned to Air Combat Command, the squadron is to activate or inactivate as needed.
