= 72nd Expeditionary Air Support Operations Squadron =

72d Expeditionary Air Support Operations Squadron
- Active: 1969–1988; after 2009
- Country: United States
- Branch: United States Air Force
- Type: Expeditionary
- Role: Air Support Operations
- Size: Squadron
- Part of: 368th Expeditionary Air Support Operations Group
- Garrison/HQ: somewhere in the Middle East
- Motto(s): Extremum Vigilate Latin
- Decorations: Air Force Outstanding Unit Award

Insignia
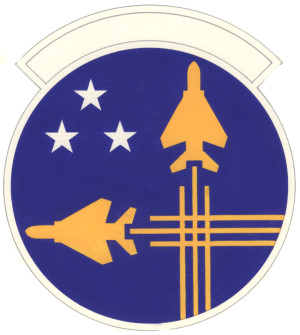
- 72d Expeditionary Air Support Operations Squadron emblem (approved 24 May 1977)

The United States Air Force's 72d Expeditionary Air Support Operations Squadron is a combat support unit located at an undisclosed location in the Middle East. The 72d provides tactical command and control of airpower assets for the Joint Forces Air Component Commander in support of the Joint Forces Land Component Commander in combat operations.

== History ==
=== Tactical Air Command ===
The squadron was first activated in June 1969 at Homestead Air Force Base, Florida, when Tactical Air Command organized separate units for its mobile Combat Reporting Posts. It drew its personnel and equipment from its parent squadron, the 4465th Tactical Control Squadron, which continued to operate a Combat Reporting Center. In October, the 4465th was inactivated and transferred its mission, personnel and equipment to the 726th Tactical Control Squadron, which was simultaneously activated. The flight continued this mission from several bases in the eastern United States until inactivating in March 1988.

=== Expeditionary unit ===
In February 2009, the flight was renamed the 72d Expeditionary Air Support Operations Squadron, converted to provisional status, and assigned to Air Combat Command to activate or inactivate as needed.

== Lineage ==
- Constituted as the 72d Tactical Control Flight on 24 June 1969

Activated on 25 June 1969
Inactivated on 31 March 1988

- Redesignated 72d Expeditionary Air Support Operations Squadron and converted to provisional status on 12 February 2009

=== Assignments ===
- 4465th Tactical Control Squadron, 25 June 1969
- 726th Tactical Control Squadron, 15 October 1969
- 507th Tactical Air Control Wing, 1 May 1977 – 31 March 1988
- Air Combat Command to activate or inactivate at any time on or after 12 Feb 2009

=== Stations ===
- Homestead Air Force Base, Florida, 25 June 1969
- Robins Air Force Base, Georgia, 30 March 1972;
- Fort Monroe, Virginia, 30 June 1976 – 31 March 1988
