= 82nd Expeditionary Air Support Operations Squadron =

82d Expeditionary Air Support Operations Squadron

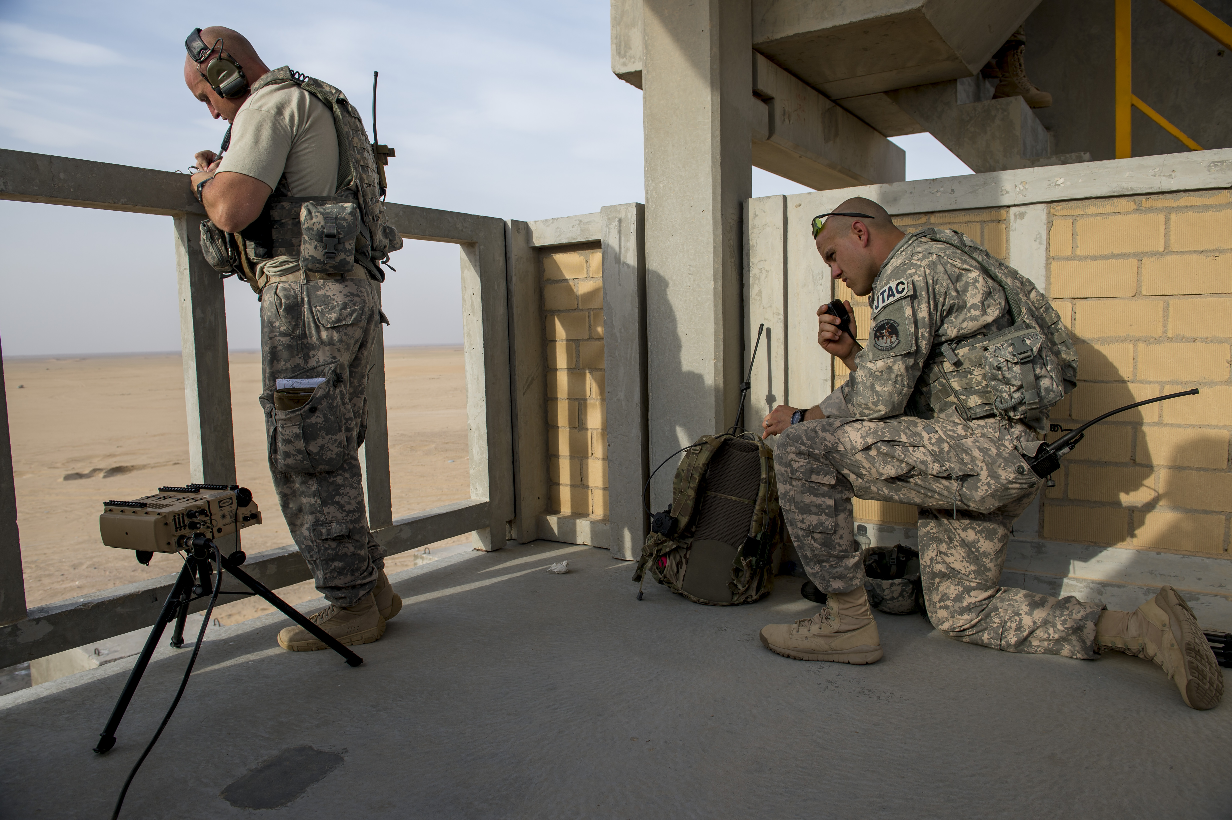
- A controller with the 82d Expeditionary Air Support Operatrions Squadron calls in an air strike during an exercise
- Active: 1969–1988; by 2014–unknown
- Country: United States
- Branch: United States Air Force
- Role: Air Support Operations
- Size: Squadron
- Part of: 368th Expeditionary Air Support Operations Group
- Garrison/HQ: Camp Buehring
- Motto: Anywhere Anytime
- Engagements: War in Afghanistan (2001-2021); War in Iraq
- Decorations: Air Force Meritorious Unit Award; Air Force Outstanding Unit Award

Insignia
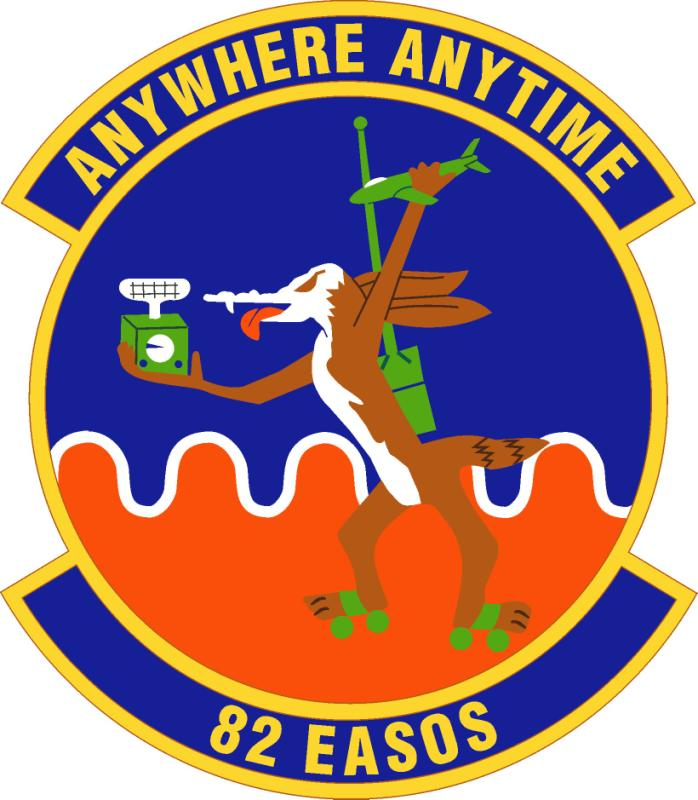
- 82d Expeditionary Air Support Operations Squadron emblem (approved a5 September 1977, revised 3 November 2010)

The 82d Expeditionary Air Support Operations Squadron is a provisional United States Air Force unit located at Camp Buehring, Kuwait. The squadron was first organized in 1969 as the 82d Tactical Control Flight, an element of the Tactical Air Control System. It was inactivated in 1988, but was converted to provisional status in 2009 and has since served in the Global War on Terror.

== Mission ==
The 82d Expeditionary Air Support Operations Squadron is a combat support unit. The squadron provides tactical command and control of airpower assets for the Joint Forces Air Component Commander in support of the Joint Forces Commander in combat operations.

== Lineage ==
- Constituted as the 82d Tactical Control Flight on 24 June 1969

Activated on 25 June 1969
Inactivated on 31 March 1988

- Redesignated 82d Expeditionary Air Support Operations Squadron and converted to provisional status on 12 Feb 2009.

Activated by July 2010

=== Assignments ===
- 4468th Tactical Control Squadron, 25 June 1969
- 609th Tactical Control Squadron, 15 October 1969
- 727th Tactical Control Squadron, 1 June 1976
- 602d Tactical Air Control Wing, 1 March 1977 – 31 March 1988
- Air Combat Command to activate or inactivate at any time on or after 12 February 2009

368th Expeditionary Air Support Operations Group, by July 2010
386th Air Expeditionary Wing, c. 18 December 2011

=== Stations ===
- McConnell Air Force Base, Kansas, 25 June 1969
- Holloman Air Force Base, New Mexico, 15 January 1973 – 31 Mar 1988
- Camp Victory, Iraq, by July 2010
- Camp Buehring, Kuwait, by May 2014
