= 807th Expeditionary Air Support Operations Squadron =

Provisional United States Air Force squadron

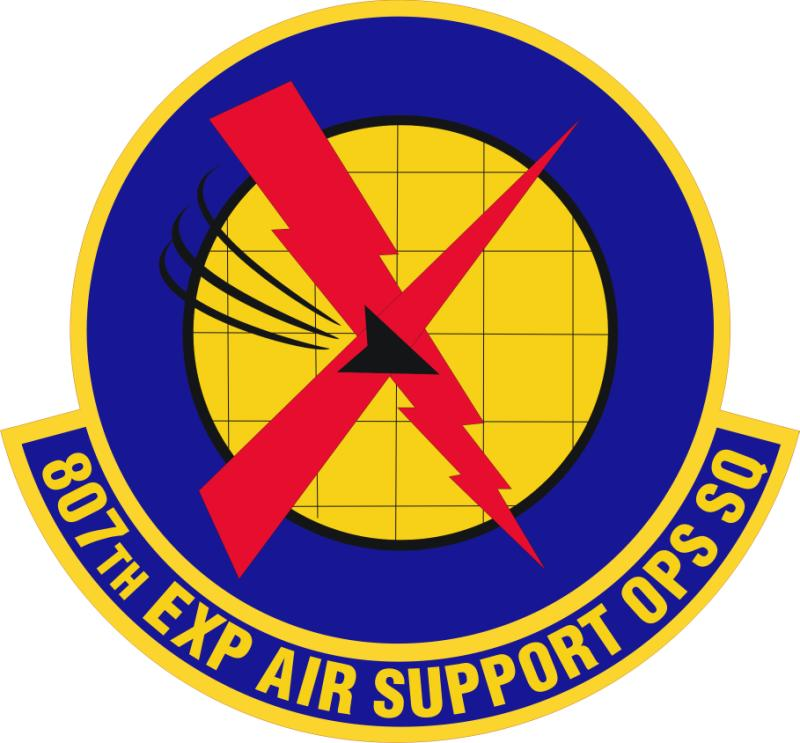
- 807th EASOS emblem
- Active: 1951–1961; 2009–present (provisional)
- Country: United States
- Branch: United States Air Force
- Type: Air support operations squadron
- Role: Expeditionary air support operations
- Size: Squadron
- Part of: Air Combat Command

The 807th Expeditionary Air Support Operations Squadron (807 EASOS) is a provisional United States Air Force unit assigned to Air Combat Command. When activated, the unit provides tactical command and control of air power assets to the Joint Force Air Component Commander and Joint Force Land Component Commander for combat operations.

== History ==
=== 807th Tactical Control Squadron ===
The unit was originally constituted as the 807th Tactical Control Squadron and activated on 1 August 1951 at Landsberg, Germany. The squadron was assigned to the 501st Tactical Control Group under Twelfth Air Force of United States Air Forces in Europe (USAFE). Its mission was to provide, operate, and maintain a Tactical Air Control Center capable of presenting a complete air picture for the Tactical Air Force Commander.

By 1957, the squadron was stationed at Landstuhl Air Base, Germany, assigned to the Tactical Control Wing, Provisional. The unit operated communications and electronics equipment including AN/FRC-35 and AN/GTA-6A systems. In May 1959, USAFE ADVON assumed operational and administrative control, and the center was redesignated as the Central Europe Combat Operations Center. By June 1959, the chain of command ran from USAFE through 17th Air Force to the 501st Tactical Control Wing and then to the 807th TCS.

The squadron maintained subordinate operating locations, including one at Birkenfeld Air Station (discontinued 1 February 1960) and one at Tempelhof Air Base, Berlin (established January 1959). The 807th Tactical Control Squadron was inactivated on 8 April 1961 at Ramstein Air Base.

=== Redesignation as EASOS ===
The unit was redesignated as the 807th Expeditionary Air Support Operations Squadron and converted to provisional status on 12 February 2009. As a provisional unit, it can be activated or inactivated at any time by Air Combat Command to meet expeditionary requirements.

== Lineage ==
- Constituted as the 807th Tactical Control Squadron on 2 July 1951

Activated on 1 August 1951
Inactivated on 8 April 1961

- Redesignated 807th Expeditionary Air Support Operations Squadron, converted to provisional status, 12 February 2009

=== Assignments ===
- 501st Tactical Control Group (later 501st Tactical Control Wing), 1 August 1951 – 8 April 1961
- Air Combat Command, to activate or inactivate at any time on or after 12 February 2009

=== Stations ===
- Landsberg Air Base, Germany, 1 August 1951
- Landstuhl Air Base, Germany
- Ramstein Air Base, Germany, –8 April 1961
