= 42nd Electronic Combat Squadron =

42nd Electronic Combat Squadron

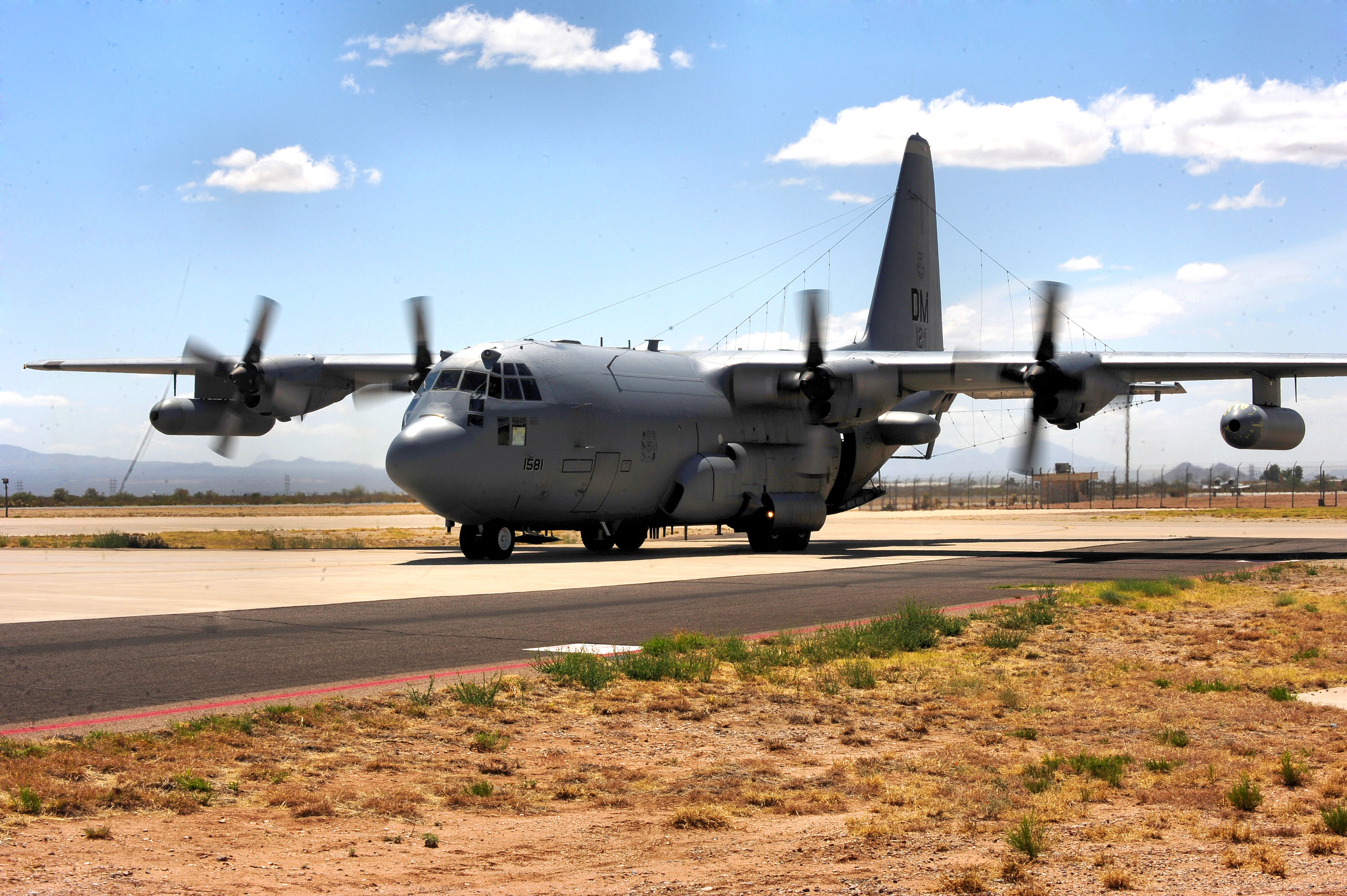
- EC-130H Compass Call aircraft
- Active: 1945–1946; 1954–1966; 1968–1974; 1983–1992; 1994–2002; 2006–present
- Country: United States
- Branch: United States Air Force
- Role: Electronic Combat crew and pilot training
- Garrison/HQ: Davis-Monthan AFB
- Engagements: World War II; Cold War; Vietnam War; Operation El Dorado Canyon; Desert Storm; Operation Deny Flight; Operation Deliberate Force; Operation Decisive Edge; Operation Deliberate Guard; Operation Deliberate Forge; Operation Allied Force

Insignia
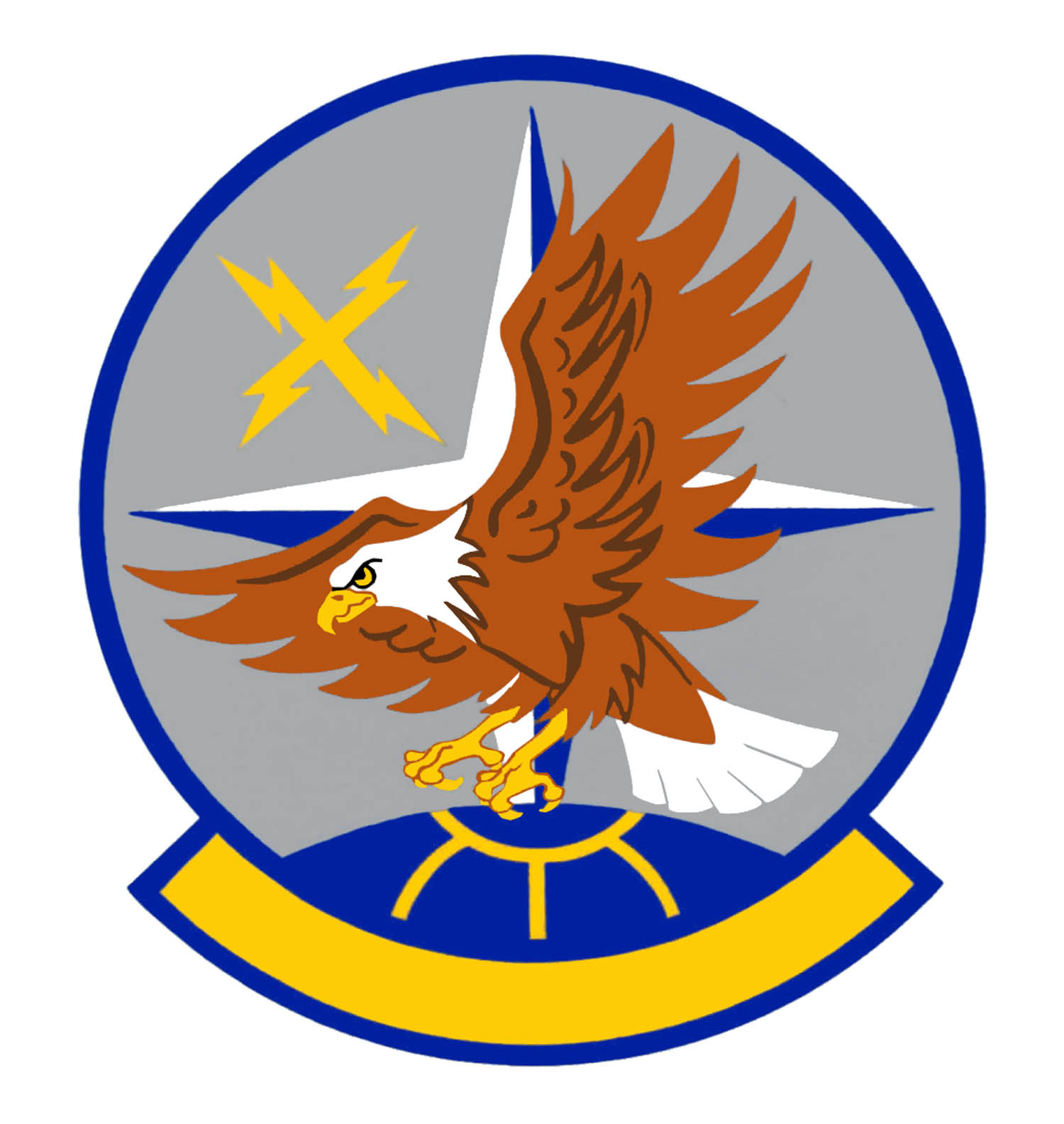
- 42nd Electronic Combat Squadron emblem (approved 20 January 1984)

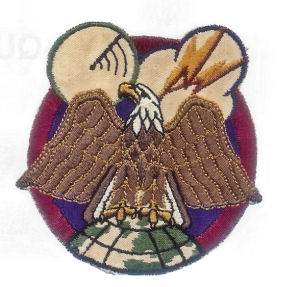
- 42nd Tactical Electronic Warfare Squadron emblem (approved 20 July 1954)

The 42nd Electronic Combat Squadron is a United States Air Force unit, first activated in 1945 as the 42nd Reconnaissance Squadron. It has been inactivated and reactivated several times, most recently in 2006. Its current assignment is with the 55th Electronic Combat Group at Davis–Monthan Air Force Base, Arizona as a geographically separated unit from its parent wing, the 55th Wing at Offutt Air Force Base, Nebraska. The squadron is the Air Force's sole EA-37B formal training unit.

== Mission ==
Provides the 55th Electronic Combat Group with combat ready Lockheed EC-130H Compass Call trained aircrews. Directs all EC-130H aircrew initial academic and flying qualification, difference and requalification training for 20 different aircrew specialties with more than 200 aircrew students trained annually. Provides registrar support to students. Maintains quality control for all aspects of contracted aircrew training and manages courseware development for 17 Air Combat Command-verified syllabi. Provides the group with simulator support for both continuation and initial qualification training.

== History ==
Constituted as 42nd Reconnaissance Squadron, Very Long Range, Photographic, on 24 October 1945. Activated on 7 November 1945 at Smoky Hill Army Air Field, Kansas. Established under VIII Bomber Command, Continental Air Forces as a very long-range strategic reconnaissance squadron. Equipped with the modified F-13 reconnaissance/mapping configuration of the B-29 Superfortress. The squadron was designated to operate from Alaska, however squadron suffered from lack of personnel due to demobilization after the end of World War II, never became fully operational and was inactivated in August 1946.

=== Cold War European operations ===
Reactivated as part of the United States Air Forces in Europe in March 1954 at Spangdahlem Air Base, West Germany. Equipped with Douglas RB-26 Invader reconnaissance aircraft, painted in black to perform night reconnaissance which were transferred from the 1st Tactical Reconnaissance Squadron when the 1st received Martin RB-57A Canberras.

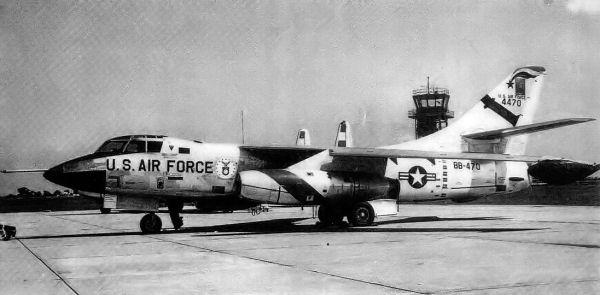
RB-66C of the 42nd Tactical Reconnaissance Squadron at Chelveston (Note: Douglas RB-66C-DT Serial 54=470. This aircraft was used during the Vietnam War and was eventually scrapped at Kadena Air Base, Okinawa in 1973)

In 1956 the B-26s were sent to reclamation and the squadron received twelve Douglas RB-66C Destroyers. The RB-66C was a specialized electronic reconnaissance and electronic countermeasures aircraft designed for jamming Soviet RADAR. Its mission was to fly with tactical fighter and fighter bomber aircraft and provide an aerial defense. An extensive suite of specialized equipment was fitted to locate and identify enemy radar emissions. Additional ECM equipment was carried in wingtip pods. Chaff dispensing pods could be carried underneath the wing outboard of the engine nacelles. In addition, it was fitted with a removable in flight refueling probe attached to the right side of the forward fuselage.

In 1959 the squadron moved to the UK as part of a USAFE realignment. Its parent 10th Tactical Reconnaissance Wing was assigned to RAF Alconbury. A shortage of facilities at Alconbury led to the 42nd being stationed at RAF Chelveston, about 20 miles west of Alconbury, where it remained as a detachment of the 10th TRW. In 1962 the runway at Chevelston was closed, and the squadron operated out of Toul-Rosieres AB, France, where it operated for a few years as Detachment 1, 10th Tactical Reconnaissance Wing.

On 10 March 1964, a wing RB-66B took off from Toul for a mission over West Germany. Because of an equipment malfunction that was undetected by the crew, the plane continued its flight to East Germany and was shot down. The crew ejected safely, but was taken prisoner, although they were released before the end of the month. This incident prompted USAFE to institute a buffer zone, where special procedures were required for aircraft flying near the eastern border of West Germany. Starting in April 1964, thirteen of the squadron's RB-66Bs began to be modified under Project Brown Cradle, to update their electronic warfare equipment and make other modifications. By 1965 the aircraft modification had been completed. However, the service of the Brown Cradle aircraft with the squadron was short. In December five of the aircraft deployed to Southeast Asia, and in May 1966, the remaining eight aircraft joined them.

These rotational deployments to France continued until October 1965 with the activation of the 25th Tactical Reconnaissance Wing at Chambley-Bussieres Air Base and the 42nd being permanently assigned to the 25th Wing. With France's withdrawal from NATO's integrated military organization in 1966, Chambley was closed and the 25th Wing was inactivated. The specially-equipped EB-66C's of the 42nd and their aircrews were sent directly to Southeast Asia for use over the skies of North Vietnam and the squadron was inactivated.

=== Vietnam War ===
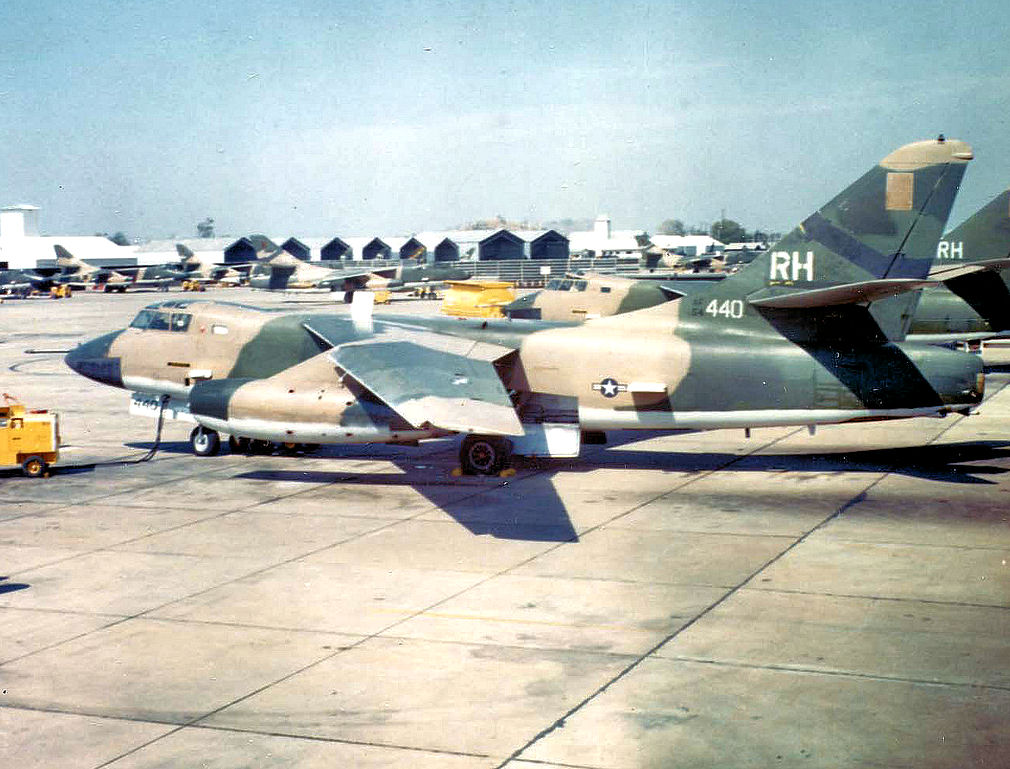
Douglas RB-66B of the 42nd Tactical Electronic Warfare Squadron in 1968 (Note: Douglas RB-66B-DL Destroyer 54-440 (converted to EB-66B), taken 25 December 1968.)

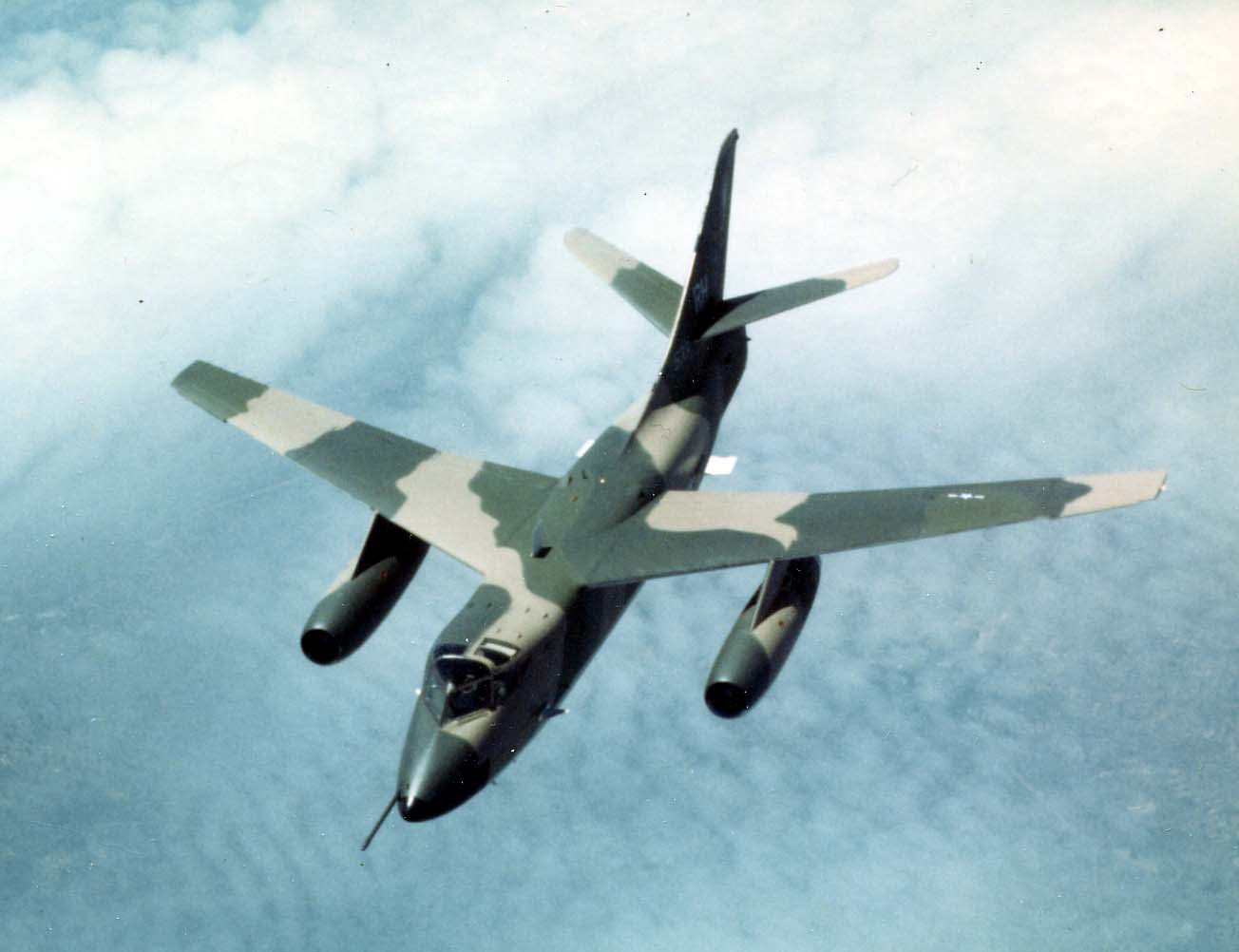
Douglas EB-66E Destroyer in flight in 1970 (Note: Aircraft of the 41st or 42nd Tactical Electronic Warfare Squadron based at Takhli over Southeast Asia on 30 March 1970.)

Reactivated in 1968 at Takhli Royal Thai Air Base under the 355th Tactical Fighter Wing. The squadron carried out electronic warfare operations over North Vietnam and Laos, locating and identifying North Vietnamese radar sites as well as along the Ho Chi Minh trail in Laos that directed missiles and AAA fire, so that strike aircraft could avoid them. The RB-66C had no offensive capability, so it could not attack the radar sites directly. Squadron was transferred to Korat Royal Thai Air Force Base in August 1970. Continued operations until the end of hostilities in January 1973, remained in Thailand until being inactivated in March 1974. (Note: Lt.Col. Iceal Hambleton, a navigator aboard an EB-66 who was shot down during the Easter Offensive and spent 11½ days behind enemy lines, was a member of the squadron. His rescue was the "largest, longest, and most complex search-and-rescue" operation during the entire Vietnam War. The rescue was dramatized in the movie Bat*21. Zimmerman, p. 320)

=== Eldorado Canyon and Desert Storm ===
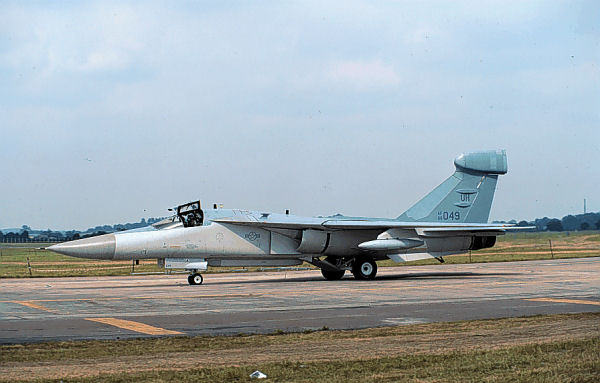
General Dynamics EF-111A of the 42nd Electronic Combat Squadron (Note: General Dynamics EF-111A Serial 66-0049 Believed to have been used as electronic jammer aircraft in Operation El Dorado Canyon. This aircraft was put on display at Mountain Home Air Force Base Idaho.)

Reactivated in 1983 with General Dynamics EF-111A Ravens at RAF Upper Heyford, England, the replacement for the Douglas EB-66 electronic warfare aircraft. Performed ECM operations for NATO aircraft. Provided electronic countermeasures to US Navy aircraft for combat in Libya, 15 April 1986 as part of Operation El Dorado Canyon. During that mission, the 42nd provided three EF-111As plus two spare aircraft to jam the Libyan radar network.

Deployed flights to Turkey and Saudi Arabia in 1991 as part of Operation Desert Shield; engaged in combat operations in 1991 as part of Operation Desert Storm. Eighteen EF-111A Ravens flew over 900 sorties. None were lost in combat, but one was lost in a non-combat related accident and both crew members were killed. The 42nd was even credited with a "kill" during Desert Storm. On the night of 17 January 1991, an Iraqi Mirage F.1 flew into the ground while chasing EF-111A serial number 66-16. Even though the Raven was unarmed and had no air-to-air capability, the Raven crew was given credit for the kill. This was originally believed to be true but after review of AWACS tapes and other data credit for the claim was withdrawn. The official award for the F.1 Mirage kill went to Capt Robert E. Graeter, 33 TFW, Special order CCAF SO GA-1, 1991, as a Maneuvering kill.

Inactivated in 1992 as part of the post Cold War drawdown of the USAF, its aircraft reassigned to the 429th Electronic Combat Squadron at Cannon Air Force Base, New Mexico.

=== Airborne Command and Control (ABCCC) Operations ===
In 1994, the squadron was reactivated and received the personnel and aircraft from the 7th Airborne Command and Control Squadron which provided procedural air control via the Airborne Battlefield Command and Control Center (ABCCC). The 7th Squadron moved on paper to Offutt Air Force Base, Nebraska and assumed a new mission, the Airborne Command Post "Looking Glass" mission in support of nuclear command and control for United States Strategic Command, as part of this mission, the 7th began flying Boeing EC-135 aircraft.

The EC-130E ABCCC consisted of seven aircraft. The EC-130E is a modified C-130 Hercules; aircraft designed to carry the AN/USC-48 Airborne Battlefield Command and Control Center Capsules (ABCCC III). While functioning as a direct extension of ground-based command and control authorities, the primary mission was to provide flexibility in the overall control of tactical air resources. In addition, to maintain positive control of air operations, ABCCC provided communications to higher headquarters, including national command authorities, in both peace and wartime environments.

The ABCCC provided unified and theater commanders the capability for combat operations during war, contingencies, exercises, and other missions. A highly trained force of mission ready crew members and specially equipped EC-130E aircraft to support worldwide combat operations. Mission roles include airborne extensions of the Air Operations Center and Airborne Air Support Operations Center for command and control of offensive air support operations; and airborne on-scene command for special operations such as airdrops or evacuations.

In September 2002, following 2,186 days (5 years, 11 months, 25 days) of continuous deployed operations (July 15, 1993 to July 10, 1999) to Aviano Air Base supporting Operation Deny Flight, Operation Deliberate Force, Operation Decisive Edge, Operation Deliberate Guard, Operation Deliberate Forge and Operation Allied Force, the unit was inactivated. Some of the aircraft were retired, some assumed new roles|missions for the U.S. Air Force. All of the capsules, save one, were scrapped.

=== Compass Call training ===
It was reactivated in 2006, after the invasions of Afghanistan and Iraq, in order to provide training for EC-130H Compass Call squadrons at Davis-Monthan Air Force Base. Since 2006, the 42nd has served as the 'schoolhouse' squadron for the 41st and 43d Electronic Combat Squadrons.

== Lineage ==
- Constituted as the 42nd Reconnaissance Squadron, Very Long Range, Photographic on 24 October 1945

Activated on 7 November 1945
Inactivated on 19 August 1946

- Redesignated 42nd Tactical Reconnaissance Squadron, Electronics and Weather on 11 December 1953

Activated on 18 March 1954
Redesignated 42nd Tactical Reconnaissance Squadron, Electronic on 1 July 1965
Discontinued and inactivated on 22 August 1966

- Redesignated 42nd Tactical Electronic Warfare Squadron and activated on 15 December 1967 (not organized)

Organized on 1 January 1968
Inactivated on 15 March 1974

- Redesignated 42nd Electronic Combat Squadron on 23 May 1983

Activated on 1 July 1983
Inactivated on 1 July 1992

- Redesignated 42nd Airborne Command and Control Squadron on 24 June 1994

Activated on 1 July 1994
Inactivated on 30 September 2002

- Redesignated 42nd Electronic Combat Squadron on 9 March 2006

Activated on 10 March 2006

=== Assignments ===
- VIII Bomber Command, 7 November 1945
- 17th Bombardment Operational Training Wing, c. 31 January 1946
- Second Air Force, 18 February 1946
- Fifteenth Air Force, 31 March-19 August 1946
- 10th Tactical Reconnaissance Group, 18 March 1954
- 10th Tactical Reconnaissance Wing, 8 December 1957
- 25th Tactical Reconnaissance Group, 1 July 1965
- 25th Tactical Reconnaissance Wing, 1 October 1965 – 22 August 1966
- Pacific Air Forces, 15 December 1967 (not organized)
- 355th Tactical Fighter Wing, 1 January 1968

Attached to 388th Tactical Fighter Wing, c. 21 September – 14 October 1970

- 388th Tactical Fighter Wing, 15 October 1970 – 15 March 1974
- 20th Tactical Fighter Wing, 1 July 1983
- 66th Electronic Combat Wing

Attached to 20th Tactical Fighter Wing, 1 June 1985

- 20th Tactical Fighter Wing (later 20th Fighter Wing), 25 January 1991 – 1 July 1992
- 355th Operations Group, 1 July 1994 – 30 September 2002
- 55th Electronic Combat Group, 10 March 2006 – present

=== Stations ===
- Smoky Hill Army Air Field, Kansas, 7 November 1945 – 19 August 1946
- Spangdahlem Air Base, West Germany, 18 March 1954
- RAF Chelveston, England, c. 20 August 1959
- Toul-Rosières Air Base, France, 1 August 1962

Deployed at Chambley-Bussières Air Base, France, 15 May-9 October 1963

- Chambley-Bussières Air Base, France, 1 July 1965 – 22 August 1966
- Takhli Royal Thai Air Force Base, Thailand, 1 January 1968
- Korat Royal Thai Air Force Base, Thailand, 22 September 1970 – 15 March 1974
- RAF Upper Heyford, England, 1 July 1983 – 1 July 1992
- Davis-Monthan Air Force Base, Arizona, 1 July 1994 – 30 September 2002
  - Deployed to Aviano Air Base, Italy, 18 July 1994 - 30 November 2001
- Davis-Monthan Air Force Base, Arizona, 10 March 2006 – present

=== Aircraft ===
- Boeing B-29 Superfortress, 1945–1946
- Douglas RB-26 Invader, 1954–1957
- T/WT-33 Shooting Star 1955–1957
- Douglas RB-66 Destroyer 1956–1965

Douglas WB-66 Destroyer 1957–1960
Douglas B-66 Destroyer 1960–1966
Douglas EB-66 Destroyer 1968–1974

- General Dynamics EF-111A Raven 1984–1992; affectionately known as the 'Spark-Vark'
- Lockheed EC-130E ABCCC 1994–2002
- Lockheed EC-130H Compass Call 2006–2024
- Gulfstream EA-37B Banshee 2025-present
