= Compass Call =

Compass Call may refer to:

- Lockheed EC-130H Compass Call, a U.S. Air Force electronic attack aircraft based on the C-130
- EA-37B Compass Call, a U.S. Air Force electronic attack aircraft based on the Gulfstream G550. Replacement for the EC-130H.
