= List of United States Air Force aircraft maintenance squadrons =

This is a List of United States Air Force aircraft maintenance squadrons.

== Squadrons ==
Squadron	Motto	Part of	Location	Notes
1st Aircraft Maintenance Squadron		1st Maintenance Group, 1st Fighter Wing	Joint Base Langley–Eustis	
2nd Aircraft Maintenance Squadron	Maintaining Global Power	2nd Maintenance Group, 2nd Bomb Wing	Barksdale Air Force Base	
4th Aircraft Maintenance Squadron		4th Maintenance Group, 4th Fighter Wing	Seymour Johnson Air Force Base	
5th Aircraft Maintenance Squadron		5th Maintenance Group, 5th Bomb Wing	Minot Air Force Base	
6th Aircraft Maintenance Squadron		6th Maintenance Group, 6th Air Mobility Wing	MacDill Air Force Base	
7th Aircraft Maintenance Squadron	Death From Above	7th Maintenance Group, 7th Bomb Wing	Dyess Air Force Base	
9th Aircraft Maintenance Squadron		9th Maintenance Group, 9th Reconnaissance Wing	Beale Air Force Base	CSS/Program Flight, Cyber Mission Flight; 99th Aircraft Maintenance Unit (AMU) and 12th AMU.
12th Aircraft Maintenance Squadron		12th Maintenance Group, 12th Flying Training Wing	Joint Base San Antonio	
18th Aircraft Maintenance Squadron		18th Maintenance Group, 18th Wing	Kadena Air Base	
19th Aircraft Maintenance Squadron		19th Maintenance Group, 19th Airlift Wing	Little Rock Air Force Base	
22nd Aircraft Maintenance Squadron		22nd Maintenance Group, 22nd Air Refueling Wing	McConnell Air Force Base	
23rd Aircraft Maintenance Squadron	Flying Tiger Maintenance	23rd Maintenance Group, 23rd Wing	Moody Air Force Base	
28th Aircraft Maintenance Squadron		28th Maintenance Group, 28th Bomb Wing	Ellsworth Air Force Base	34th AMU and 37th AMU.
31st Aircraft Maintenance Squadron	Dominant and Expeditionary	31st Maintenance Group, 31st Fighter Wing	Aviano Air Base	
33rd Aircraft Maintenance Squadron	Gorillas	33rd Maintenance Group, 33rd Fighter Wing	Eglin Air Force Base	
35th Aircraft Maintenance Squadron		35th Maintenance Group, 35th Fighter Wing	Misawa Air Base	
49th Aircraft Maintenance Squadron	Warheads on Foreheads	49th Maintenance Group, 49th Wing	Holloman Air Force Base	
55th Aircraft Maintenance Squadron	Quality and Integrity	55th Maintenance Group, 55th Wing	Offutt Air Force Base	
56th Aircraft Maintenance Squadron		56th Maintenance Group, 56th Fighter Wing	Luke Air Force Base	21 AMU "Gamblers," 61 AMU "Top Dogs," 62 AMU "Spikes,"; 63rd AMU "Panthers," and 425th AMU "Black Widows".
57th Aircraft Maintenance Squadron		57th Maintenance Group, 57th Wing	Nellis Air Force Base	
60th Aircraft Maintenance Squadron		60th Maintenance Group, 60th Air Mobility Wing	Travis Air Force Base	
62nd Aircraft Maintenance Squadron	Outstanding Maintenance	62nd Maintenance Group, 62nd Airlift Wing	Joint Base Lewis–McChord	
92nd Aircraft Maintenance Squadron		92nd Maintenance Group, 92nd Air Refueling Wing	Fairchild Air Force Base	
96th Aircraft Maintenance Squadron		96th Maintenance Group, 96th Test Wing	Eglin Air Force Base	
97th Aircraft Maintenance Squadron		97th Maintenance Group, 97th Air Mobility Wing	Altus Air Force Base	
100th Aircraft Maintenance Squadron		100th Maintenance Group, 100th Air Refueling Wing	RAF Mildenhall	
131st Aircraft Maintenance Squadron		131st Maintenance Group, 131st Bomb Wing	Whiteman Air Force Base	
192nd Aircraft Maintenance Squadron		192nd Maintenance Group, 192nd Fighter Wing	Joint Base Langley–Eustis	
305th Aircraft Maintenance Squadron		305th Maintenance Group, 305th Air Mobility Wing	Joint Base McGuire–Dix–Lakehurst	
315th Aircraft Maintenance Squadron	Committed to Excellence	315th Maintenance Group, 315th Airlift Wing	Joint Base Charleston	
319th Aircraft Maintenance Squadron		319th Operations Group, 319th Reconnaissance Wing	Grand Forks Air Force Base	348 AMU
349th Aircraft Maintenance Squadron		349th Maintenance Group, 349th Air Mobility Wing	Travis Air Force Base	
355th Aircraft Maintenance Squadron		355th Maintenance Group, 355th Fighter Wing	Davis–Monthan Air Force Base	
388th Aircraft Maintenance Squadron		388th Maintenance Group, 388th Fighter Wing	Hill Air Force Base	
432nd Aircraft Maintenance Squadron		432nd Maintenance Group, 432d Wing	Creech Air Force Base	
433rd Aircraft Maintenance Squadron		433rd Maintenance Group, 433rd Airlift Wing	Joint Base San Antonio	
434th Aircraft Maintenance Squadron		434th Maintenance Group, 434th Air Refueling Wing	Grissom Air Reserve Base	
436th Aircraft Maintenance Squadron		436th Maintenance Group, 436th Airlift Wing	Dover Air Force Base	
437th Aircraft Maintenance Squadron		437th Maintenance Group, 437th Airlift Wing	Joint Base Charleston	
439th Aircraft Maintenance Squadron		439th Maintenance Group, 439th Airlift Wing	Westover Air Reserve Base	
445th Aircraft Maintenance Squadron		445th Maintenance Group, 445th Airlift Wing	Wright-Patterson Air Force Base	
446th Aircraft Maintenance Squadron		446th Maintenance Group, 446th Airlift Wing	Joint Base Lewis–McChord	
452nd Aircraft Maintenance Squadron		452nd Maintenance Group, 452nd Air Mobility Wing	March Air Reserve Base	
459th Aircraft Maintenance Squadron		459th Maintenance Group, 459th Air Refueling Wing	Joint Base Andrews	
461st Aircraft Maintenance Squadron		461st Maintenance Group, 461st Air Control Wing	Robins Air Force Base	
507th Aircraft Maintenance Squadron		507th Maintenance Group, 507th Air Refueling Wing	Tinker Air Force Base	
509th Aircraft Maintenance Squadron	Keepers Of The Spirit	509th Maintenance Group, 509th Bomb Wing	Whiteman Air Force Base	Inactivated in 2024, replaced by the 393rd Bomber Generation Squadron.
512th Aircraft Maintenance Squadron		512th Maintenance Group, 512th Airlift Wing	Dover Air Force Base	
514th Aircraft Maintenance Squadron		514th Maintenance Group, 514th Air Mobility Wing	Joint Base McGuire–Dix–Lakehurst	
605th Aircraft Maintenance Squadron		305th Maintenance Group, 305th Air Mobility Wing	Joint Base McGuire–Dix–Lakehurst	
660th Aircraft Maintenance Squadron		60th Maintenance Group, 60th Air Mobility Wing	Travis Air Force Base	
514th Aircraft Maintenance Squadron		514th Maintenance Group, 514th Air Mobility Wing	Joint Base McGuire–Dix–Lakehurst	
723rd Aircraft Maintenance Squadron	We Maintain So Others May Live	23rd Maintenance Group, 23rd Wing	Moody Air Force Base	
736th Aircraft Maintenance Squadron		436th Maintenance Group, 436th Airlift Wing	Dover Air Force Base	
755th Aircraft Maintenance Squadron	We Maintain The Jam	55th Electronic Combat Group, 55th Wing	Davis–Monthan Air Force Base	55th Wing Geographically Separated Unit (GSU)
756th Aircraft Maintenance Squadron	Jaguars	56th Maintenance Group, 56th Fighter Wing	Luke Air Force Base	308 AMU "Emerald Knights", 309 AMU "Wild Ducks" and 310 AMU "Top Hats".
812th Aircraft Maintenance Squadron		12th Maintenance Group	NAS Pensacola	
860th Aircraft Maintenance Squadron		60th Maintenance Group, 60th Air Mobility Wing	Travis Air Force Base	
908th Aircraft Maintenance Squadron		908th Maintenance Group, 908th Airlift Wing	Maxwell Air Force Base	
916th Aircraft Maintenance Squadron		916th Maintenance Group, 916th Air Refueling Wing	Seymour Johnson Air Force Base	
927th Aircraft Maintenance Squadron		927th Maintenance Group, 927th Air Refueling Wing	MacDill Air Force Base	
931st Aircraft Maintenance Squadron		931st Maintenance Group, 931st Air Refueling Wing	McConnell Air Force Base	
932nd Aircraft Maintenance Squadron		932nd Maintenance Group, 932nd Airlift Wing	Scott Air Force Base	
940th Aircraft Maintenance Squadron		940th Maintenance Group, 940th Air Refueling Wing	Beale Air Force Base	

== Special Operations ==
Squadron	Motto	Part of	Location	Notes
27th Special Operations Aircraft Maintenance Squadron		27th Special Operations Maintenance Group, 27th Special Operations Wing	Cannon Air Force Base	9th AMU and 16th AMU.
727th Special Operations Aircraft Maintenance Squadron		727th Special Operations Maintenance Group, 27th Special Operations Wing	Cannon Air Force Base	3rd AMU and 20th AMU.

== Expeditionary ==
Squadron	Motto	Part of	Location	Notes
379th Expeditionary Aircraft Maintenance Squadron		379th Expeditionary Maintenance Group, 379th Air Expeditionary Wing	Al Udeid Air Base	
380th Expeditionary Aircraft Maintenance Squadron		380th Expeditionary Maintenance Group, 380th Air Expeditionary Wing	Al Dhafra Air Base	
407th Expeditionary Aircraft Maintenance Squadron		407th Expeditionary Maintenance Group, 407th Air Expeditionary Group	Ali Al Salem Air Base; Ahmad al-Jaber Air Base	
