= 55th Wing =

US Air Force unit

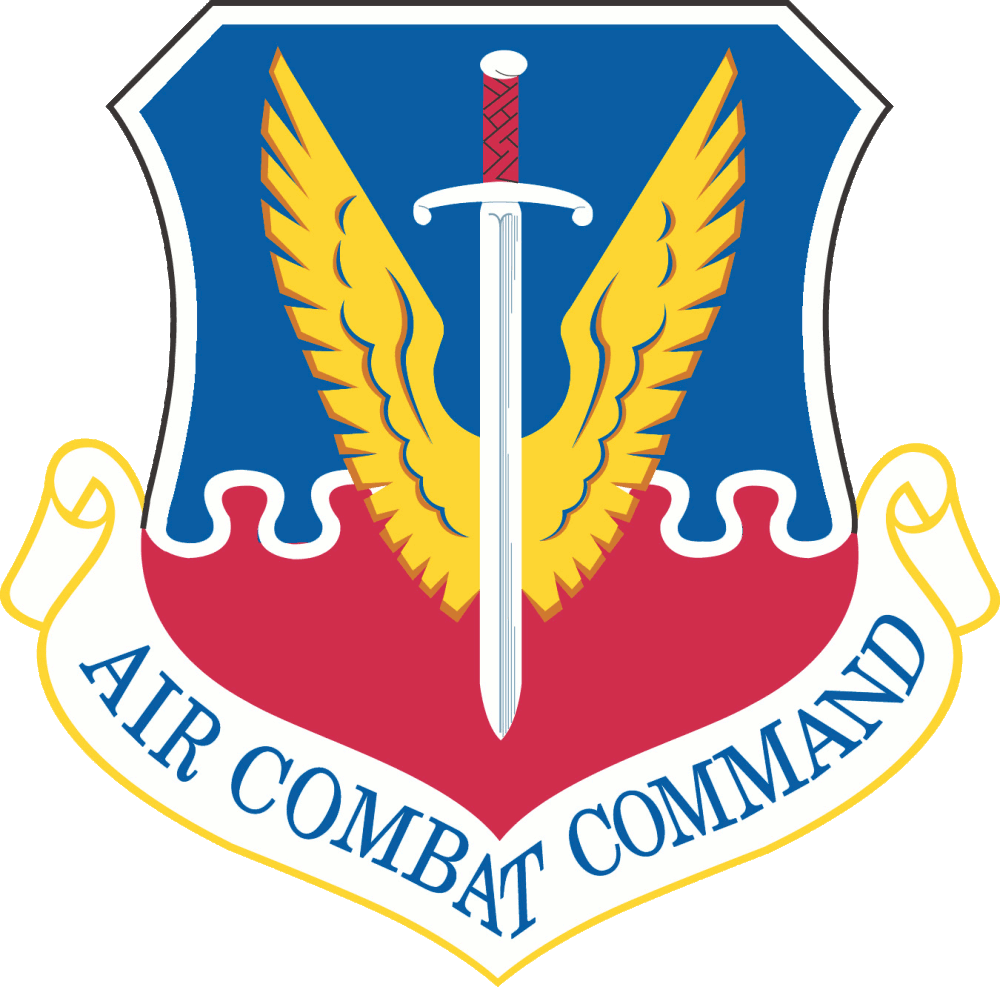
55th Wing

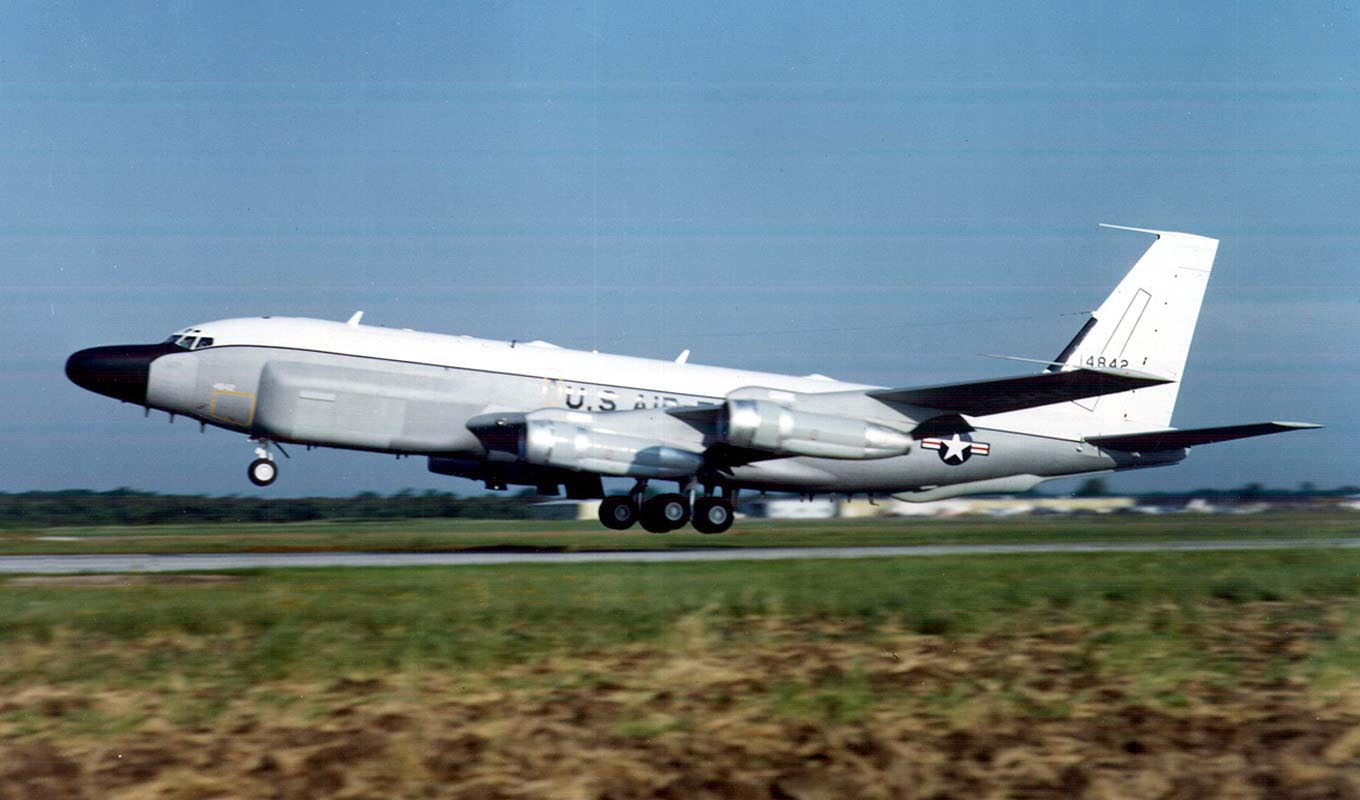
- RC-135V Rivet Joint of the 55th Wing
- Active: 1948–1949; 1950 – present
- Country: United States
- Branch: United States Air Force
- Type: Operational wing
- Role: Reconnaissance; Information warfare; Electronic warfare
- Size: c. 7,800 personnel
- Part of: Air Combat Command (Sixteenth Air Force)
- Headquarters: Offutt Air Force Base, Nebraska
- Nicknames: The Fightin' fifty-fifth; War hawks
- Mottos: Pursuit to defend (from 1942); Videmus omnia (Latin for 'We see all') (after 1954)
- Decorations: Distinguished Unit Citation; Meritorious Unit Commendation; Air Force Outstanding Unit Award
- Website: Official website

Commanders
- Current commander: Colonel Aaron T. Gray

Insignia
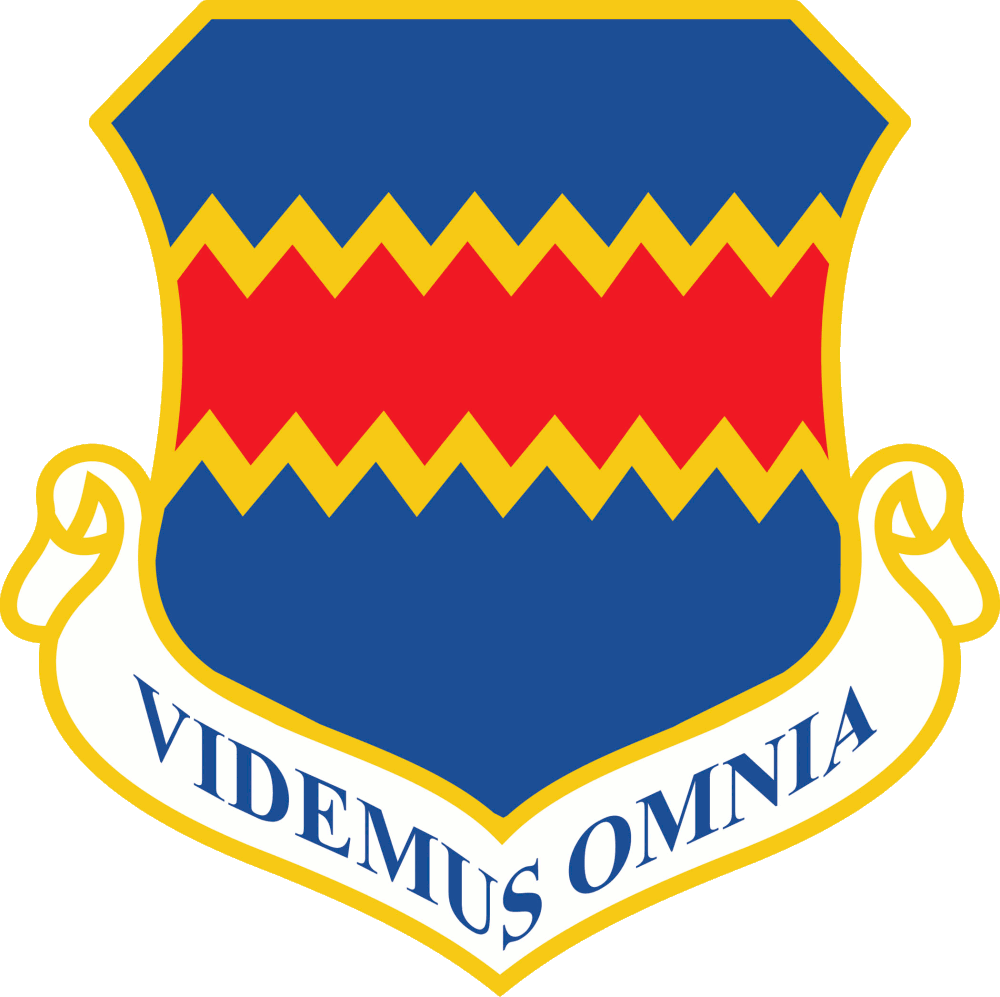
- 55th Wing emblem (Note: Originally approved on 18 February 1942 for the 55th Pursuit Group with a different shape. It was adopted by the wing on 20 November 1951, but later replaced. It was restored as the wing emblem on 15 June 1994.)

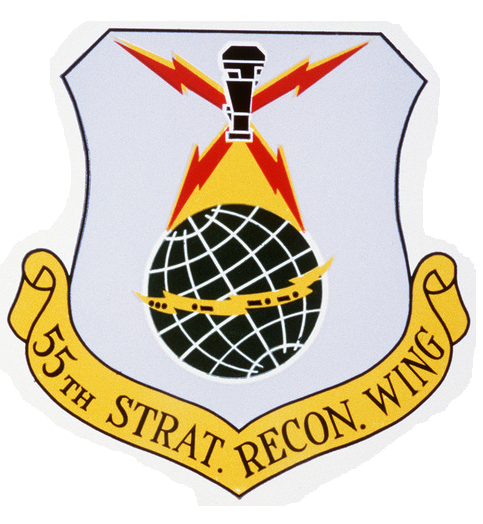
- 55th Strategic Reconnaissance Wing emblem (Note: Approved 4 February 1954.)
- Tail code: OF

Aircraft flown
- Electronic warfare: EA-37B Compass Call; EC-130H Compass Call
- Reconnaissance: RC-135S Cobra Ball; RC-135U Combat Sent; RC-135V/W Rivet Joint; WC-135R/W Constant Phoenix
- Trainer: TC-135W

The 55th Wing is a United States Air Force unit assigned to Air Combat Command. The wing is primarily stationed at Offutt Air Force Base, Nebraska, but maintains one of its groups and associated squadrons at Davis-Monthan Air Force Base, Arizona, as a geographically separated unit.

The 55 WG is the only Air Force wing with continuous operations, maintenance, and aircraft presence in the United States Central Command area of responsibility since Operation Desert Storm.

The wing's mission is to provide worldwide reconnaissance, real-time intelligence, command and control, information warfare and combat support to U.S. leaders and commanders. One of the wing's units, the 55th Operations Group, operates 46 aircraft, including 13 models of seven different types. It is the largest wing in Air Combat Command and flies the most diverse number of aircraft.

== History ==
Since its inception, the "Fightin' Fifty-Fifth" has operated around the world, flying a wide variety of aircraft. In June 2007 the wing was given the nickname 'war hawks' after an adversary described the RC-135S Cobra Ball mission in the Pacific as, 'imperialist war hawks running amuck'.

=== Cold War ===
On 1 November 1950, the 55th Strategic Reconnaissance Wing (55 SRW) was activated under the Wing Base Organization at Ramey Air Force Base, Puerto Rico, as the headquarters for the 55th Strategic Reconnaissance Group and its supporting units. From 1950 to 1954 the Wing's task was to perform strategic reconnaissance, charting photography, precise electronic geodetic mapping, and electronic reconnaissance missions. In 1952, the wing moved to Forbes Air Force Base, Kansas, and converted to Boeing RB-50 Superfortresses. On 13 March 1953, a wing RB-50 flying out of Eielson Air Force Base, Alaska, was attacked by Soviet Mikoyan-Gurevich MiG-15 fighters near Siberia, but was able to ward off the fighter's attack with defensive fire. The United States protested the attack, stating the plane was on a weather reconnaissance flight over international waters, 25 miles from the Kamchatka Peninsula. The Soviets responded by saying the plane was intercepted over their territory near Cape Krestovoi. A little more than three months later, on 29 July 1953 an RB-50 of the wing's 343d Strategic Reconnaissance Squadron was shot down by Soviet fighters about ninety miles south of Vladivostok. (Note: The plane was temporarily attached to the 91st Strategic Reconnaissance Squadron for the mission. Farquhar, p. 46.) The Soviet Union did not deny the plane's location was over water, but claimed that the bomber had twice flown over Soviet territory and fired on their MiGs, who then returned fire defensively.

The wing formally assumed a global strategic reconnaissance mission in 1954 and transitioned to the RB-47E "Stratojet." The Wing was deployed at Ben Guerir Air Base, in what was then French Morocco, between May and August 1955.

When the mapping and charting functions originally assigned to the 55th Reconnaissance Group were transferred on 1 May 1954, the wing assumed the mission of global strategic reconnaissance, including electronic reconnaissance. It also carried out weather reconnaissance operations until June 1963, and photographic reconnaissance missions until May 1964.

The wing moved to Offutt Air Force Base, Nebraska, in August 1966. That same year the 55th's 38th Strategic Reconnaissance Squadron assumed responsibility for SAC's airborne command and control system. The 2d Airborne Command and Control Squadron inherited this mission after activation in April 1970. The 1st Airborne Command and Control Squadron, flying E-4A aircraft, transferred to the 55th on 1 November 1975, bringing with it the National Emergency Airborne Command Post, now called the National Airborne Operations Center. The Wing flew reconnaissance operations during the U.S. military operations in Grenada in 1983 and Libya in 1986. On 1 March 1986, the 55 SRW became the host unit at Offutt after the inactivation of the 3902d Air Base Wing.

The Wing ended nearly twenty-five years of continuous Airborne Command Post ('Looking Glass') operations in 1990, assumed a modified alert posture, and continued worldwide reconnaissance. In October 1998, the wing transferred control of the EC-135 LOOKING GLASS mission to the United States Navy's TACAMO aircraft and the 7th Airborne Command and Control Squadron, which flew the EC-135 LOOKING GLASS aircraft, inactivated.

The wing deployed a Rivet Joint RC-135 from Hellenikon Air Base, Greece, to Riyadh Air Base, Saudi Arabia, on 8 August 1990, and began 24-hour-a-day reconnaissance of the region two days later for Central Command Commander Gen. Norman Schwarzkopf, under Operation Desert Shield. At the start of Operation Desert Storm, 18 January 1991, the wing continued to provide real-time information. In 1996, this operation moved to Prince Sultan Air Base, Saudi Arabia. On 9 August 2015, the wing celebrated 25 years of what is believed to be the longest continuous deployment by an Air Force unit.

=== Current operations ===
The 55th Strategic Reconnaissance Wing became the 55th Wing on 1 September 1991, to reflect the wing's performance of a diversity of missions. When SAC disestablished and Air Combat Command (ACC) established, the wing transferred to ACC and gained its fifth operational location.

The 55th SRW and the 55th Wing has been awarded the USAF's P. T. Cullen Award five times since 1971 for its contributions to photo and signal intelligence collection.

Aircraft and crews from the unit have at times temporarily relocated to the nearby Lincoln Air National Guard Base when Offutt's runway has been closed for repairs.

== Mission ==
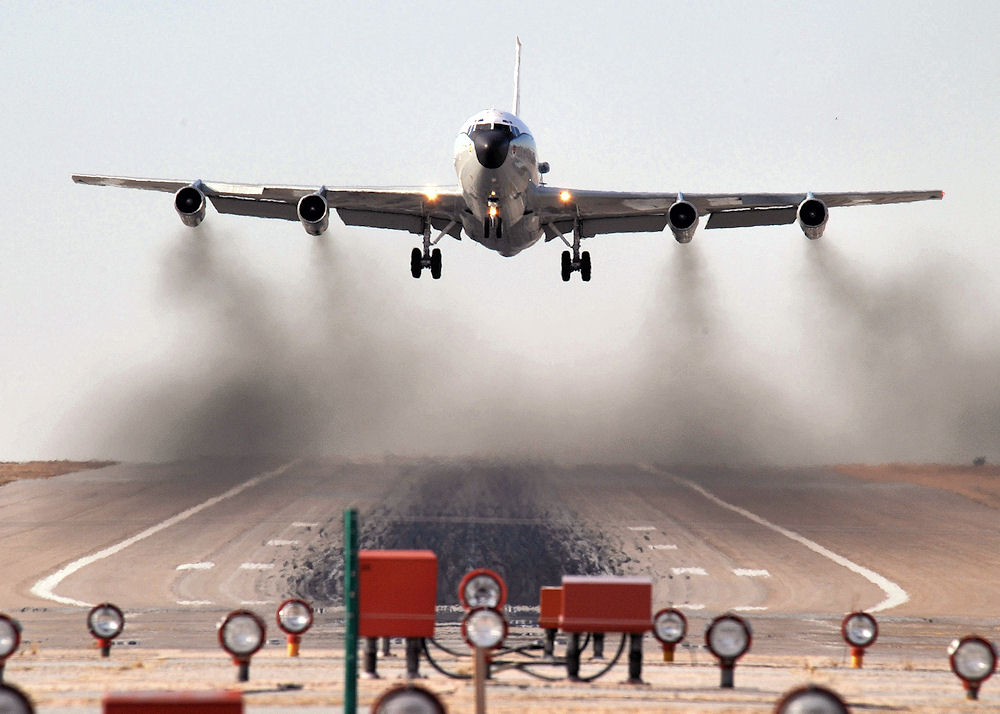
WC-135W Constant Phoenix

The wing is composed of more than 7,800 personnel organized into six groups operating at six different geographic locations around the globe. Colonel Aaron T. Gray was appointed the wing commander in June 2025.

The 55th Operations Group is Air Combat Command's largest group, has operational control over 12 squadrons and two detachments worldwide. It employs 46 aircraft, including 13 models of seven different types.

The 55th Communications Group provides worldwide command, control, communications and computer (C4) systems, information management and combat support to war-fighting and national leadership. It also provides communications technology and support to the 55th Wing and 44 tenant units.

Combat-ready EC-130H Compass Call aircraft, crews, maintenance and operational support to combatant commanders is provided by the 55th Electronic Combat Group, based Davis Monthan Air Force Base, Arizona

Operations are supported by the 55th Maintenance Group which provides centralized direction of all maintenance staff functions providing support to world-wide aircraft reconnaissance missions. The 55th Medical Group serves 50,000 beneficiaries with extensive outpatient clinic capabilities and ancillary support and the 55th Mission Support Group provides vital mission support for Offutt Air Force Base through engineering, security, mission support, services, supply, transportation, contracting and deployment readiness programs.

== Component units and assigned aircraft ==
Unless otherwise indicated, units are based at Offutt AFB, Nebraska, and subordinate units are located at the same location as their commanding group.

55th Wing Staff

- 55th Comptroller Squadron

55th Operations Group

- 38th Reconnaissance Squadron – RC-135V/W Rivet Joint
- 45th Reconnaissance Squadron – RC-135S "Cobra Ball", RC-135U Combat Sent, WC-135R/W Constant Phoenix
- 55th Intelligence Support Squadron
- 55th Operations Support Squadron
- 82d Reconnaissance Squadron (Kadena AB, Japan) – RC-135U/V/W
- 95th Reconnaissance Squadron (RAF Mildenhall, United Kingdom) – RC-135U/V/W
- 97th Intelligence Squadron
- 338th Combat Training Squadron – TC-135W
- 343rd Reconnaissance Squadron – RC-135V/W Rivet Joint
- 390th Intelligence Squadron
- 488th Intelligence Squadron
- Detachment 1 (Joint Base Elmendorf-Richardson, Alaska) – RC-135U/V/W

55th Communications Group

- 55th Cyber Squadron
- 55th Strategic Communications Squadron

55th Electronic Combat Group (Davis-Monthan AFB, Arizona)

- 41st Electronic Combat Squadron – EC-130H Compass Call
- 42nd Electronic Combat Squadron – EC-130H Compass Call
- 43rd Electronic Combat Squadron – EC-130H Compass Call
- 755th Aircraft Maintenance Squadron
- 755th Operations Support Squadron

55th Maintenance Group

- 55th Aircraft Maintenance Squadron
- 55th Maintenance Squadron

55th Medical Group

- 55th Aerospace Medicine Squadron
- 55th Dental Squadron
- 55th Medical Operations Squadron
- 55th Medical Support Squadron

55th Mission Support Group

- 55th Civil Engineering Squadron
- 55th Contracting Squadron
- 55th Force Support Squadron
- 55th Logistics Readiness Flight
- 55th Security Forces Squadron

== Lineage ==
- Established as the 55th Strategic Reconnaissance Wing on 29 June 1948

Activated on 19 July 1948
Inactivated on 14 October 1949

- Redesignated 55th Strategic Reconnaissance Wing, Medium on 27 October 1950

Activated on 1 November 1950
Redesignated: 55th Strategic Reconnaissance Wing on 16 August 1966
Redesignated: 55th Wing on 1 September 1991

=== Assignments ===
- 311th Air Division, 19 July 1948 – 14 October 1949
- Second Air Force, 1 November 1950
- 21st Air (later, 21st Strategic Aerospace) Division, 1 October 1952

Attached to 5th Air Division, 18 May-16 August 1955

- 810th Strategic Aerospace Division, 1 September 1964
- 12th Strategic Aerospace Division, 2 July 1966
- 14th Strategic Aerospace (later, 14th Air) Division, 30 June 1971
- 4th Air Division, 1 October 1976
- 57th Air Division, 1 April 1980
- 12th Air Division, 1 October 1982
- 14th Air Division, 1 October 1985
- Second Air Force, 1 September 1991
- Twelfth Air Force, 1 July 1993
- Eighth Air Force, 1 October 2002
- Twelfth Air Force, 1 October 2009
- Twenty-Fifth Air Force, 1 October 2014
- Sixteenth Air Force, 11 October 2019 – present

=== Components ===
Groups

- 55th Strategic Reconnaissance Group (later 55th Operations Group): 19 July 1948 – 14 October 1949; 1 November 1950 - 16 June 1952; 1 September 1991 – present
- 55th Electronic Combat Group: 3 February 2003 – present

Squadrons

- 1st Airborne Command and Control Squadron: 1 November 1975 – 6 October 2016
- 1st Strategic Reconnaissance Squadron (Provisional): attached 1 September-9 October 1948
- 1st Strategic Reconnaissance Squadron: attached 10–26 October 1948; attached 14 January-1 June 1949
- 2d Airborne Command and Control Squadron: 1 April 1970 – 19 July 1994
- 7th Airborne Command and Control Squadron: 19 July 1994 – 1 October 1998
- 11th Airlift Flight: 1 May 1993 – 1 April 1997
- 23d Strategic Reconnaissance Squadron: attached 1–17 June 1949
- 38th Reconnaissance: attached 6 January 1951 – 15 June 1952, assigned 16 June 1952 – 1 April 1970; assigned 1 April 1979 – Present.
- 24th Reconnaissance Squadron, 7 July 1992 – 30 June 1994
- 45th Reconnaissance Squadron, 1 July 1994 – Present
- 55th Air Refueling Squadron: attached 8 January 1951 – 15 June 1952, assigned 16 June 1952 – 18 February 1954; assigned 1 October 1955 – 15 March 1963 (detached 31 October-27 December 1956)
- 55th Mobile Command and Control Squadron: 1984-29 September 2006
- 82d Reconnaissance Squadron: 2 October 1991 – present
- 97th Intelligence Squadron: ?–present
- 323d Strategic Reconnaissance Squadron: attached 19 September-10 October 1949
- 338th Strategic Reconnaissance Squadron: attached 25 November 1950 – 15 June 1952, assigned 16 June 1952 – 15 June 1963; assigned 25 March-25 December 1967
- 343d Strategic Reconnaissance Squadron (later 343d Reconnaissance Squadron): attached 19 July-26 October 1948; attached 4 January 1951 – 15 June 1952, assigned 16 June 1952 - Present.
- 390th Intelligence Squadron ?–present
- 488th Intelligence Squadron?–present
- 548th Strategic Missile Squadron: attached 1–31 August 1964, assigned 1 September 1964 – 25 March 1965
- 922d Reconnaissance Squadron: 1 June 1992 – 30 June 1994

=== Stations ===
- Topeka Air Force Base (later Forbes Air Force Base), Kansas, 19 July 1948 – 14 October 1949
- Ramey Air Force Base, Puerto Rico, 1 November 1950
- Forbes Air Force Base, Kansas, 5 October 1952
- Offutt Air Force Base, Nebraska, 16 August 1966 – present

=== Aircraft and missiles ===
- B/RB-17 Flying Fortress, 1948–1949
- B/RB-29 Superfortress, 1948–1949; 1950-1951
- RC-54 Skymaster, 1948
- RB-50 Superfortress, 1950–1954
- EB/RB-47 Stratojet, 1954–1967
- KC-97 Stratofreighter, 1956-?
- SM-65 Atlas, 1964–1965
- EC-135, 1966–1998
- KC-135 Stratotanker, 1966–1998
- RC-135, 1967–present
- Boeing E-4, 1975–present
- C-135, 1977–1994
- TC-135, 1988–present
- T-38, 1992–1995
- WC-135, 1992–present
- C-21, 1993-1997
- OC-135: 1994–2021
- EC-130 Hercules, 2002–present
- EA-37B, 2024–present

== See also ==
- List of B-29 units of the United States Air Force
- List of B-50 units of the United States Air Force
- List of B-47 units of the United States Air Force
- List of wings of the United States Air Force
