= 43rd Electronic Combat Squadron =

43d Electronic Combat Squadron
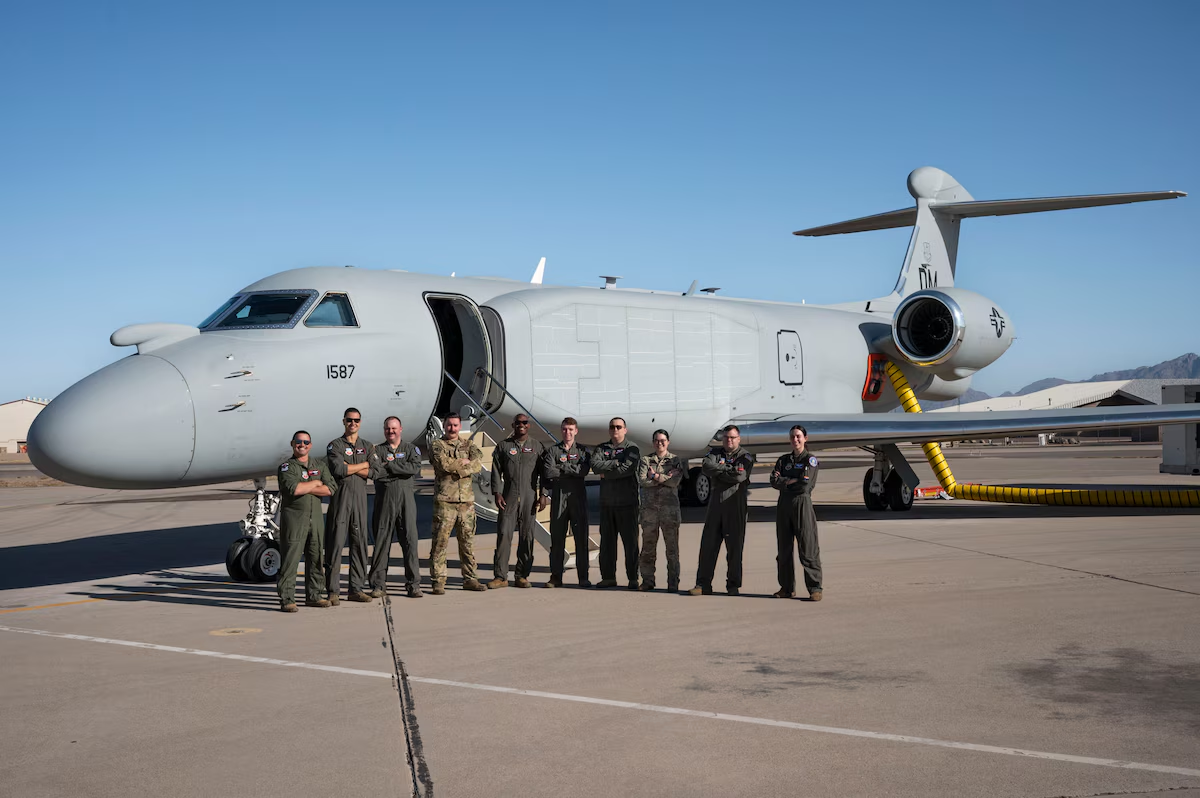
- Squadron members pose with a EA-37B
- Active: 1917–1919; 1935–1936; 1940–1946; 1954–1959; 1986–1991; 1992–present
- Country: United States
- Branch: United States Air Force
- Role: Electronic combat
- Part of: Air Combat Command
- Garrison/HQ: Davis-Monthan AFB
- Nickname: Bats
- Motto: Veritatem Renunciamus (Latin for 'We Report the Truth') (1955-1959)
- Engagements: World War I Pacific Theater of World War II; Desert Storm; Kosovo War; Global war on terrorism Operation Epic Fury
- Decorations: Air Force Meritorious Unit Award; Air Force Outstanding Unit Award

Insignia
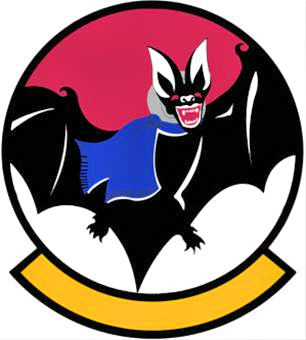
- 43d Electronic Combat Squadron emblem (Note: Approved 5 November 1987.)

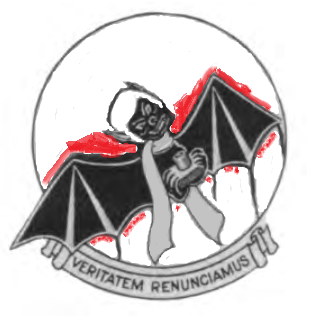
- 43rd Tactical Reconnaissance Squadron emblem (Note: Approved 5 November 1987.)

The 43d Electronic Combat Squadron is a United States Air Force unit. Its current assignment is with the 55th Electronic Combat Group, being stationed as a tenant unit at Davis-Monthan Air Force Base, Arizona as a geographically separated unit from its parent, the 55th Wing at Offutt Air Force Base, Nebraska. It operates the EA-37B communications-jamming aircraft.

The squadron is one of the oldest in the United States Air Force, its origins dating to 17 August 1917, when it was organized at Kelly Field, Texas. It later served in France as part of the American Expeditionary Force during World War I. The squadron saw combat during World War II, and became part of Tactical Air Command during the Cold War.

== Mission ==
Along with the 41st Electronic Combat Squadron, the unit accomplishes the Compass Call mission, providing capabilities in the realm of electronic warfare for the Air Force and poised for immediate deployment to specific theater contingencies. The unit's combat mission is to support tactical air, ground and naval operations by confusing the enemy's defenses and disrupting its command and control capabilities.

The squadron flies the EA-37 aircraft, replacing the EC-130H. To execute its missions, the aircraft were modified with electronic countermeasures systems, specialized jamming equipment, the capability for air refuelling, as well as upgraded engines and avionics. Modifications made to the aircraft vary between the two squadrons, to help each squadron meet its specific mission-oriented needs.

== History ==
The 43rd has a long history beginning 17 August 1917, as the 86th Aero Squadron. It served as part of the zone of advance in France during the latter part of World War I. Then in 1935, it was an observation squadron operating as part of the Air Corps Tactical School at Maxwell Air Force Base, Alabama. Beginning 7 December 1941, the squadron conducted patrols over the Hawaiian islands.

The squadron then switched yet again. As a combat mapping squadron, the unit's aircrews flew over Japanese held islands photographing and mapping the terrain and enemy positions. The 86th prepared the way for the taking of the Marshall Islands, Wake Island, Saipan, Guam, and Iwo Jima. Finally, in 1944, the squadron made the first photographic mosaics of Tokyo. The squadron was redesigned as the 43rd Reconnaissance Squadron (Long Range Photographic) in 1945 then was inactivated in 1946.

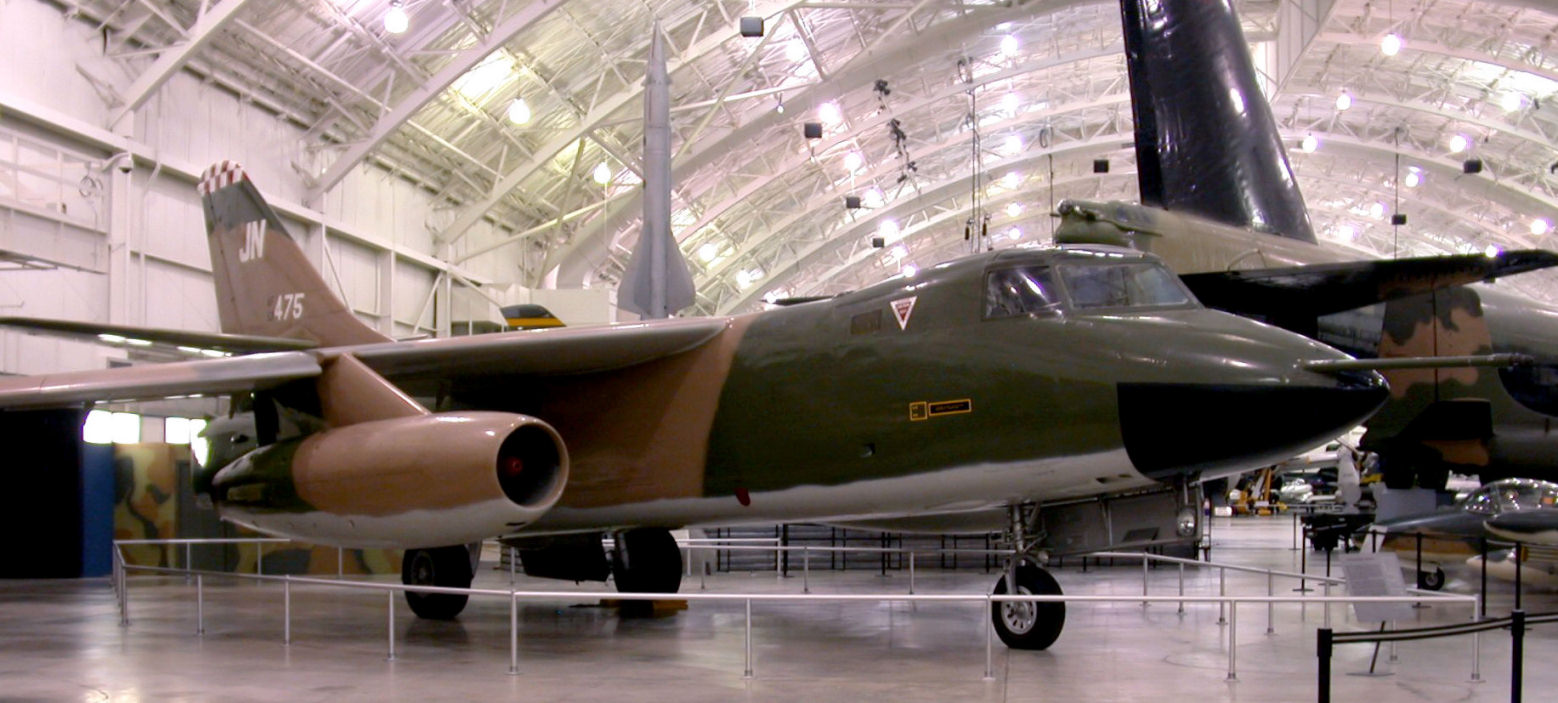
A Douglas RB-66B Destroyer at the National Museum of the United States Air Force.

In January 1954, the 43rd was again activated, this time at Shaw Air Force Base, South Carolina. The squadron was initially equipped with the Martin RB-57 Canberra. However, once the Air Force received enough Douglas RB-66B Destroyer to equip more than a single squadron, the squadron transitioned to the Destroyer. It accomplished a night photographic mission. The unit was inactivated in 1959.

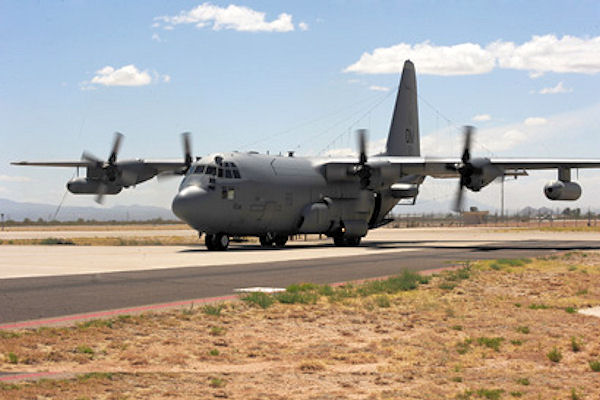
43d Electronic Combat Squadron EC-130H Compass Call

Redesignated the 43rd Electronic Combat Squadron, the unit was activated 6 June 1986, at Sembach Air Base, Germany. It served in Europe until 1991, then came to Davis-Monthan Air Force Base and the 355th Wing on 1 May 1992, as the sister squadron to the 41st. The 43rd earned a combat streamer for its duties in World War I and six more for missions flown in the Pacific during World War II.

The squadron began converting to the L3Harris EA-37B Compass Call, with the first plane being delivered on 23 August 2024 to begin pilot training. It flew its first EA-37 mission with a full mission crew in early May 2025. The EA-37B is a wide-area airborne electromagnetic attack weapon system. It uses a heavily modified version of the Gulfstream G550 airframe, and has replaced the EC-130H as a more modern and cost-effective aircraft. By the time this mission was flown, ten of the squadron's fourteen EC-130H aircraft had been divested.

In late March 2026, the 43rd deployed two of their EA-37Bs from Davis Monthan AFB. The squadron’s deployment was to the Middle East, to begin combat sorties within Operation Epic Fury against Iran.

== Lineage ==
86th Aero Squadron

- Organized as the 86th Aero Squadron on 17 August 1917

Demobilized on 26 May 1919

- Reconstituted and consolidated with the 86th Observation Squadron on 1 December 1936

43d Electronic Combat Squadron'

- Constituted as the 86th Observation Squadron and activated on 1 March 1935

Inactivated on 1 September 1936

- Consolidated with the 86th Aero Squadron on 1 December 1936
- Activated on 1 February 1940

Redesignated 86th Observation Squadron (Medium) on 26 February 1942
Redesignated 86th Observation Squadron on 4 July 1942
Redesignated 86th Reconnaissance Squadron (Bomber) on 31 May 1943
Redesignated 86th Combat Mapping Squadron on 13 November 1943
Redesignated 43d Reconnaissance Squadron, Long Range, Photographic on 16 June 1945
Inactivated on 22 February 1946

- Redesignated 43d Tactical Reconnaissance Squadron, Night-Photographic on 14 January 1954

Activated on 18 March 1954
Redesignated 43d Tactical Reconnaissance Squadron, Night Photo-Jet on 8 April 1956
Inactivated on 18 May 1959

- Redesignated 43d Electronic Combat Squadron on 6 June 1986

Activated on 1 October 1986
Inactivated on 31 July 1991

- Activated on 1 May 1992

=== Assignments ===
- Unknown, 17 August 1917
- Advanced Air Service Depot, September 1918
- Unknown, March 1919 - 26 May 1919
- Air Corps Tactical School, 1 March 1935 – 1 September 1936
- Hawaiian Department, 1 February 1940
- Hawaiian Air Force (later Seventh Air Force), November 1940
- Army Air Forces, Pacific Ocean Areas (later, United States Army Strategic Air Forces), 24 October 1944 (attached to VI Air Service Area Command after 24 October 1944, Detachment attached to 4th Reconnaissance Group, June–August 1945)
- US Army Forces, Middle Pacific, 14 September 1945 (attached to 7th Fighter Wing)
- Twentieth Air Force, 18 September 1945 (attached to 7th Fighter Wing)
- Seventh Air Force, 1 January 1946 – 22 February 1946 (attached to 7th Fighter Wing)
- 432d Tactical Reconnaissance Group, 18 March 1954
- 363d Tactical Reconnaissance Wing, 8 February 1958 – 18 May 1959 (attached to 432d Tactical Reconnaissance Wing, c. 1 February 1959 – 7 April 1959)
- 66th Electronic Combat Wing, 1 October 1986 – 31 July 1991
- 355th Operations Group, 1 May 1992
- 55th Electronic Combat Group, 2006 – present

=== Stations ===
- Kelly Field, Texas, 17 August 1917
- Scott Field, Illinois, 24 September 1917
- Garden City, New York, 26 February-5 March 1918
- Shoreham by Sea, England, 25 March-11 August 1918
- St. Maixent Replacement Barracks, France, 15 August 1918
- Romorantin Aerodrome, France, c. 25 August 1918
- Vavincourt Aerodrome, France, 4 September 1918
- Behonne Advance Air Depot, France, 18 September 1918
- Bordeaux, France, c. 9 March 1919-unknown
- Camp Lee, Virginia, c. 23–26 May 1919
- Maxwell Field, Alabama, 1 March 1935 – 1 September 1936
- Wheeler Field, Hawaii, 1 February 1940
- Bellows Field, Hawaii, 15 March 1941
- Hilo Airport, Hawaii, June 1942
- Wheeler Field, Hawaii, 17 August 1942 - c. 28 June 1944 (detachment operated from Kwajalein, May 1944 - June 1944, and from Eniwetok, June 1944 - August 1944)
- Saipan, 8 1 July 1944 - 6 November 1944 (air echelon, less Eniwetok detachment, at Wheeler Field to October 1944, and then at Kahuka Army Air Base, Hawaii)
- Kahuka Army Air Base, Hawaii, 24 November 1944 (detachment operated from Puerto Princesa Airfield, Palawan, Philippines June 1945 - August 1945)
- Wheeler Field, Hawaii, February 1946 - 22 February 1946
- Shaw Air Force Base, South Carolina, 18 March 1954 – 18 May 1959
- Sembach Air Base, Germany, 1 October 1986 – 31 July 1991
- Davis-Monthan Air Force Base, Arizona, 1 May 1992 – present

=== Aircraft ===
- Included Thomas-Morse O-19 during period 1935–1936
- In addition to O-47, 1940–1943,
- Douglas B-18 Bolo, 1942–1943,
- included Martin B-12, 1940–1942,
- O-49, 1941–1942;
- and Douglas A-20 Havoc, Douglas A-24 Banshee, Taylorcraft L-2, Aeronca L-3, Culver PQ-8, and Martin AT-23 Marauder, 1943
- Principally Consolidated F-7 Liberator?, 1944–1945
- Martin RB-57 Canberra, 1954–1956
- Douglas RB-66 Destroyer, 1956–1959
- EC-130H Compass Call, 1987–1991; 1992–2024
- EA-37B Compass Call, 2024–present
