= 41st Electronic Combat Squadron =

US Air Force unit

41st Electronic Combat Squadron

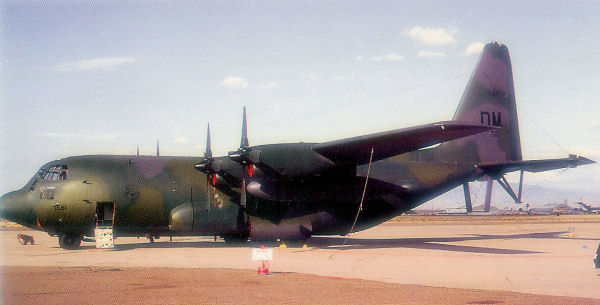
- 41st Electronic Combat Squadron EC-130H Compass Call 73-1581
- Active: 1917–1946; 1954–1959; 1965–1969; 1980–present
- Country: United States
- Branch: United States Air Force
- Role: Electronic warfare
- Nickname: Scorpions
- Engagements: World War I Antisubmarine Campaign; Vietnam War; Desert Storm
- Decorations: Presidential Unit Citation; Air Force Outstanding Unit Award with Combat "V" Device; Air Force Outstanding Unit Award; Republic of Vietnam Gallantry Cross with Palm

Insignia
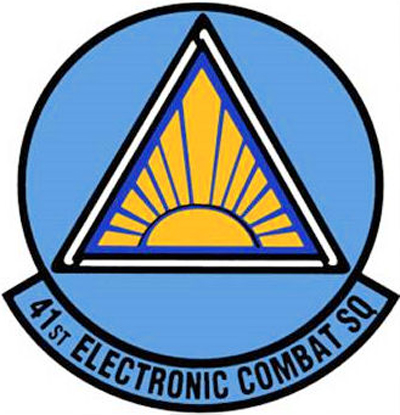
- 41st Electronic Combat Squadron emblem (approved 28 October 1981)

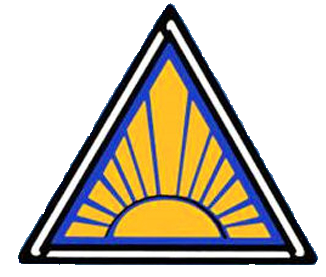
- 9th Airship Company emblem (approved 3 January 1933) (Note: The original triangular emblem was placed on a light blue disc in 1981 and slightly modified in 1994. AFHRA Factsheet.)

The 41st Electronic Combat Squadron is a United States Air Force unit. Its current assignment is with the 55th Electronic Combat Group at Davis–Monthan Air Force Base, Arizona as a geographically separated unit from its parent wing, the 55th Wing at Offutt Air Force Base, Nebraska. It operates the EA-37B compass call communications-jamming aircraft.

The squadron is one of the oldest in the United States Air Force, its origins dating to 14 June 1917, when it was organized at Kelly Field, Texas. It served overseas in France as part of the American Expeditionary Forces during World War I. The squadron also saw combat during World War II, and became part of Tactical Air Command (TAC) during the Cold War. It also holds the distinction of being the longest continuously deployed U.S. Air Force unit (2002–2021).

== History ==
=== World War I ===
The squadron's origins date to the 9th Balloon Company of the Observation Balloon Service in World War I, which served with the French 17th and 32nd Army Corps, and the III and IV Army Corps, United States Army, from 16 August – 11 November 1918.

=== World War II ===
The squadron provided air defense for Panama Canal, January 1942 – May 1944, with occasional antisubmarine patrols over the Caribbean and Pacific, especially during May and June 1942; deployed to Western Pacific in June 1945, but never entered combat.

=== Cold War ===
The squadron was reactivated at Shaw Air Force Base, South Carolina, where it was assigned to the 432d Tactical Reconnaissance Group and equipped with Douglas RB-26 Invader aircraft. In 1956 as deliveries of the Douglas RB-66B Destroyer to the Air Force increased, the squadron was equipped with the newer jet aircraft.

=== From the 1960s ===
The unit fought in Southeast Asia, c. November 1965 – 31 October 1969.

The unit was tasked with command, control, and communications countermeasures from 1982 onwards. It flew electronic countermeasures missions from the United Arab Emirates during Operation Desert Shield/Operation Desert Storm from 27 August 1990 – 17 April 1991.

=== Post-9/11 Operations ===
From 2002 to 2021, the 41st Electronic Combat Squadron was the longest continuously deployed unit in the history of the U.S. Air Force, primarily supporting Operation Enduring Freedom and Operation Resolute Support in Afghanistan. Over this 19-year deployment, the squadron flew nearly 14,800 sorties and logged over 90,000 combat flight hours, providing critical electronic warfare support.

== Lineage ==
- Organized as Company A, 4th Balloon Squadron on 13 November 1917

Redesignated 9th Balloon Company on 25 July 1918
Redesignated 9th Airship Company on 30 August 1921
Redesignated 9th Airship Squadron on 26 October 1933
Redesignated 1st Observation Squadron on 1 June 1937
Redesignated 1st Observation Squadron (Medium) on 13 January 1942
Redesignated 1st Observation Squadron on 4 July 1942
Redesignated 1st Reconnaissance Squadron (Special) on 25 June 1943
Redesignated 41st Photographic Reconnaissance Squadron on 25 November 1944
Redesignated 41st Tactical Reconnaissance Squadron on 24 January 1946
Inactivated on 17 June 1946

- Redesignated 41st Tactical Reconnaissance Squadron, Night-Photographic on 14 January 1954

Activated on 18 March 1954
Inactivated on 18 May 1959

- Redesignated 41st Tactical Reconnaissance Squadron, Photo-Jet and activated on 30 June 1965 (not organized)

Organized on 1 October 1965
Redesignated 41st Tactical Reconnaissance Squadron on 8 October 1966
Redesignated: 41st Tactical Electronic Warfare Squadron on 15 March 1967
Inactivated on 31 October 1969

- Redesignated 41st Electronic Combat Squadron on 17 June 1980

Activated on 1 July 1980

=== Assignments ===
- Unknown, 13 November 1917
- Balloon Wing, IV Army Corps, 5 August 1918
- Balloon Wing, III Army Corps, 21 September 1918
- Balloon Group, III Army Corps, 8 October 1918
- 2d Balloon Group, First Army (United States), c. 20 November 1918 – December 1918
- Unknown, December 1918 – May 1919
- Army Balloon School, Fort Omaha, Nebraska, May 1919
- Fourth Corps Area, October 1921
- 1st Airship Group (later 21st Airship Group), 19 July 1922
- Sixth Corps Area, 1 June 1937
- Seventh Corps Area (attached to Cavalry School), 15 June 1937
- Cavalry School, c. 1939
- Second United States Army, 3 October 1940

Two flights attached to Cavalry School to c. April 1941
Third flight remained assigned to Cavalry School throughout period

- II Air Support Command, 1 September 1941

Flight attached to Cavalry School to c. December 1941

- 72d Observation Group (later 72d Reconnaissance) Group), 26 September 1941

Attached to 6th Bombardment Group, 10 April 1942 – c. June 1942

- Sixth Air Force, 1 November 1943
- II Tactical Air Division, 24 May 1944
- III Tactical Air Division, 24 June 1944
- III Tactical Air Command, 1 October 1944
- III Tactical Air Division, 4 December 1944
- 7th Fighter Wing, 18 April 1945
- AAF, Pacific Ocean Area (attached to XXI Bomber Command), 13 June 1945
- United States Army Forces, Middle Pacific (attached to Twentieth Air Force), 16 July 1945
- 315th Bombardment Wing, 18 September 1945
- VII Fighter Command (later 46th Fighter Wing), 4 January 1946 – 17 June 1946
- 432d Tactical Reconnaissance Group, 18 March 1954
- 363d Tactical Reconnaissance Wing, 8 February 1958 – 18 May 1959
- Tactical Air Command, 20 June 1965 (not organized
- 363d Tactical Reconnaissance Wing, 1 October 1965
- Thirteenth Air Force, 20 October 1965
- 460th Tactical Reconnaissance Wing, 18 February 1966
- 432d Tactical Reconnaissance Wing, 18 September 1966
- 355th Tactical Fighter Wing, 15 August 1967 – 31 October 1969
- 552d Airborne Warning and Control Wing (later 552d Airborne Warning and Control Division), 1 July 1980
- 28th Air Division, 1 April 1985

Attached to Air Division Provisional, 15, 5 December 1990 – 17 April 1991

- 355th Operations Group, 1 May 1992
- 55th Electronic Combat Group, 2006 – Present

=== Stations ===
- Fort Omaha, Nebraska, 13 November 1917
- Camp Morrison, Virginia, 9 February 1918 – 29 June 1918
- Camp de Meucon, Morbihan, France, 17 July 1918
- Broussey-Raulecourt, France, 14 August 1918
- Xivray-et-Marvoisin, France, 12 September 1918
- St Benoit-en-Woevre, France, 14 September 1918
- Lamarche-en-Woevre, France, 16 September 1918
- Thierville, France, 22 September 1918
- Cumières, France, 9 October 1918
- Consenvoye, France, 7 November 1918
- Fromeréville-les-Vallons, France, 12 November 1918
- Damvillers, France, 14 November 1918
- Ville-sur-Cousances, France, 26 November 1918
- Colombey-les-Belles, France, 4 February 1919
- Bordeaux, France, 18 February 1919 – 20 April 1919
- Camp Stuart, Virginia, 4 May 1919
- Camp Lee, Virginia, 9 May 1919
- Fort Omaha, Nebraska, 18 May 1919
- Scott Field, Illinois, 28 October 1921
- Fort Omaha, Kansas, 15 June 1937 – 27 December 1941
- Rio Hato, Panama, 14 January 1942
- Howard Field, Panama Canal Zone, 19 January 1942
- David, Panama, 17 April 1942
- Rio Hato, Panama, 10 May 1942
- Howard Field, Panama Canal Zone, 20 June 1942 – 7 May 1944
- Pounds Field, Texas, 24 May 1944
- Muskogee Army Air Field, Oklahoma, 7 December 1944 – 4 April 1945
- Kualoa Field, Hawaii, 18 April 1945 – 31 May 1945
- Agana Airfield, Guam, Mariana Islands 13 June 1945

Detachment at: North Field (Iwo Jima), Iwo Jima, Bonin Islands (Japan), 9 August 1945 – c. 15 September 1945

- East Field (Saipan), Mariana Islands, 4 January 1946
- Agana Airfield, Guam, Mariana Islands, 15 April 1946 – 17 June 1946
- Shaw Air Force Base, South Carolina, 18 March 1954 – 18 May 1959
- Shaw Air Force Base, South Carolina, 1 October 1965
- Takhli RTAFB, Thailand, 20 October 1965 – 31 October 1969
- Davis–Monthan Air Force Base, Arizona, 1 July 1980 – present

Deployed at Bateen Air Base, (Note: Bateen Air Base as referred to in AFHRA is Al Bateen Executive Airport, as it uses the same airport code (OMAD).) United Arab Emirates, 27 August 1990 – 17 April 1991.

== Aircraft ==
- Type R observation balloon, 1918–1919,
- 1919–1921; probably included RN-1 (Zodiac), type SST (Mullion), type AA (pony blimp), A-4, D-4, OA-1, AC-1, TA-1, TA-5, TC-1, TC-3, TC-5, TC-6, TC-10, TC-11, TC-14, TE-1, type TE-3, and TF-1 nonrigid airships, RS-9 semirigid airship, type R (later, C-3) and C-6 observation balloons, and A-6, A-7, and A-8 spherical balloons during period 1922–1937.
- Thomas-Morse O-19, Douglas O-25, and apparently O-46, during period 1937–1939.
- O-47, 1938–1944, L-4 and B-18, 1942–1944,
- P-39, 1943–1944, included Kellett YG-1B, c. 1938–1940, YO-51 Dragonfly, 1940–1941, Bellanca YO-50, and apparently O-59 Grasshopper, 1941, O-49, 1941–1943, and CG-4, 1943; A-20, 1944, primarily F-5 Lightning, 1944–1946.
- Douglas RB-26 Invader, 1954–1956;
- Douglas RB-66 Destroyer, 1956–1959.
- Douglas RB-66 Destroyer, 1965; EB-66, 1965–1969.
- EC-130H Compass Call, 1982–2026
- EA-37B Compass Call, 2026- [4]

== See also ==
- French blimps operated by the USN
- U.S. Army airships
