= L3Harris EA-37B Compass Call =

American electronic warfare airplane

EA-37B Compass Call
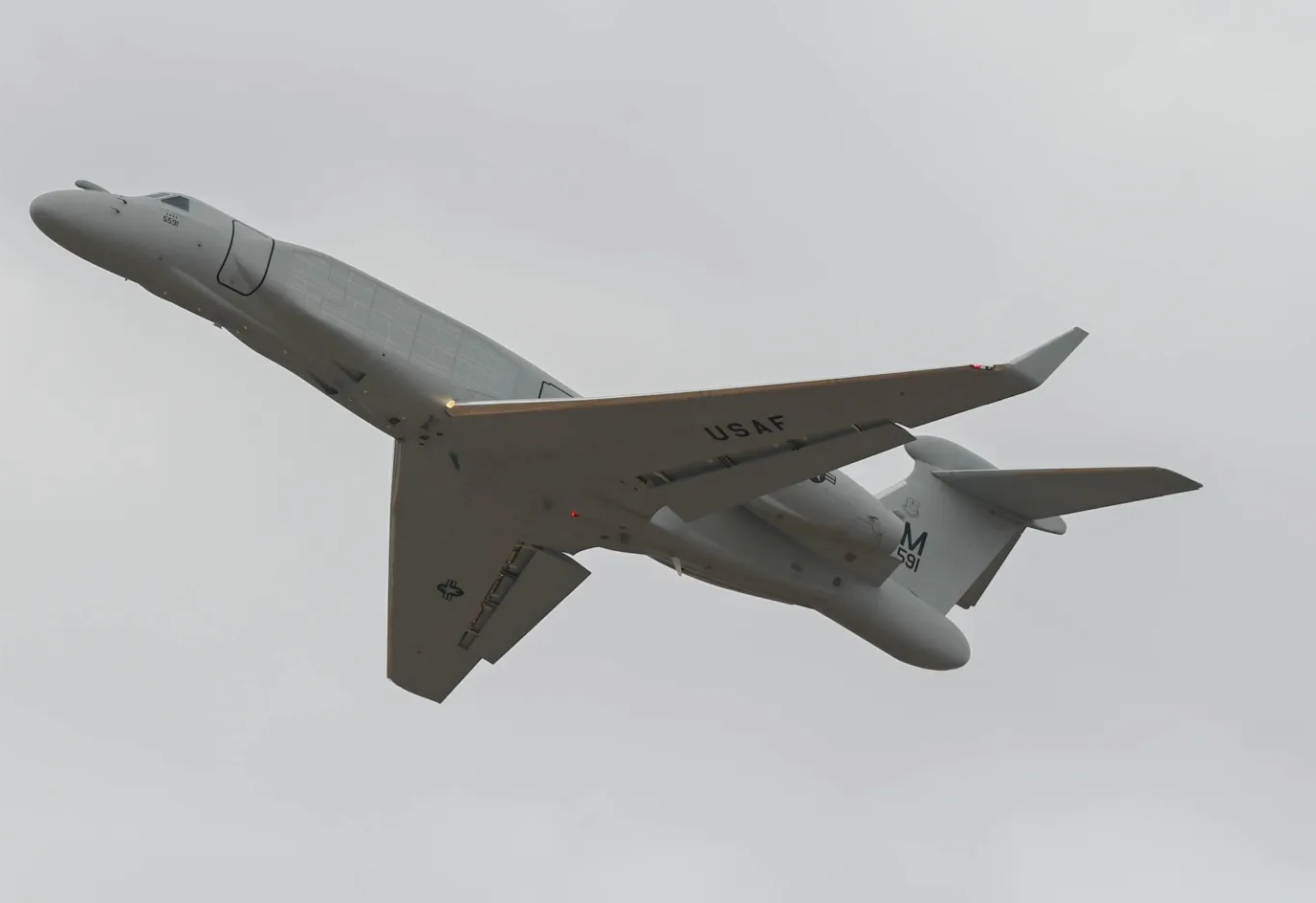

General information
- Type: Electronic warfare aircraft
- National origin: United States
- Manufacturer: Gulfstream Aerospace (airframe) L3Harris Technologies & BAE Systems (mission systems)
- Primary user: United States Air Force
- Number built: 5 out of 10 total planned

History
- Introduction date: 23 August 2024
- Developed from: Gulfstream G550

The EA-37B Compass Call (formerly EC-37B) is an electronic warfare aircraft based on the Gulfstream G550 entering service with the United States Air Force with the first example delivered on 23 August 2024 to Davis–Monthan Air Force Base for crew training. The plane is replacing the EC-130H Compass Call.

The role of the Compass Call is to disrupt enemy command and control communications, radars, and navigation systems, significantly hindering adversary coordination as part of the Counter-Command, Control, Computers, Communications, Cyber, Intelligence, Surveillance, and Reconnaissance Targeting (Counter-C5ISRT) mission. The jet will be able to conduct jamming of radars, electronic systems and communications. It will thus be able to participate in Suppression of Enemy Air Defenses (SEAD) missions by disrupting an enemy's ability to coordinate sensors and use weapon batteries that target friendly aircraft.

== Design ==
EA-37B are Gulfstream G550 business jet airframes modified with electronic warfare equipment by L3Harris and BAE Systems. The most distinctive feature are the large antenna arrays conformally mounted on either side of the fuselage; these are based on the radar arrays found on the G550 CAEW (Conformal Airborne Early Warning). The aircraft has gone through multiple "Baseline" iterations throughout its development, with Baseline 4 being the latest. It incorporates BAE Systems' Small Adaptive Bank of Electronic Resources (SABER) technology.

Among the equipment also found on the aircraft are: Network Centric Collaborative Targeting (NCCT) systems, System Control and Monitoring subsystems, Radio Frequency Receiver (RFR) subsystems, Software-defined Radio (SDR) subsystems, Counter Radar Assembly, Array Panels, AN/ARC-210 RT-2036 radios, KG-250 In-line Network Encryptors, KY-100 Narrow/wideband Terminals, KIV-77 Mode 4/5 Identification Friend or Foe (IFF), AN/PYQ-10C Simple Key Loaders

== History ==
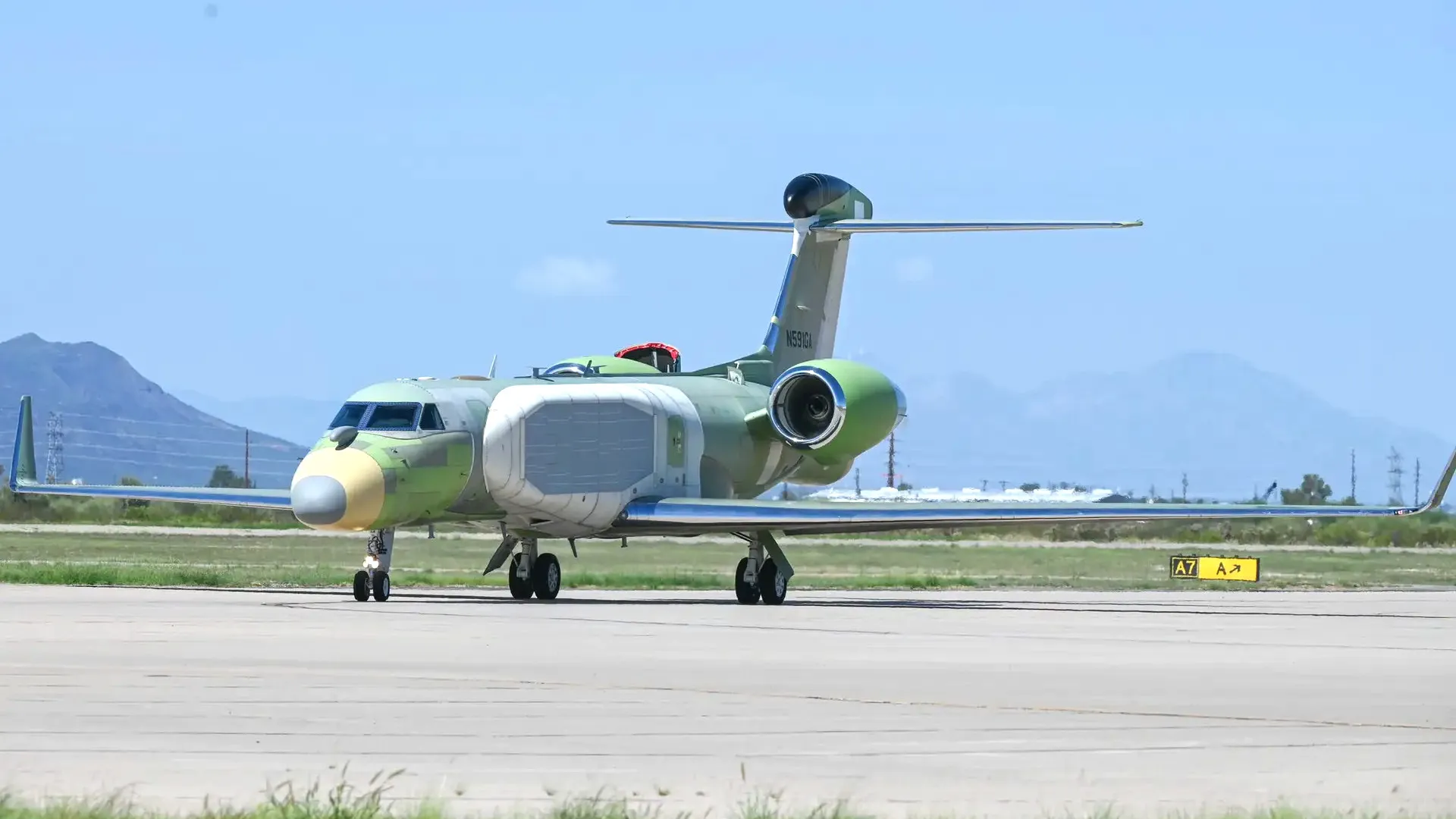
Initial Test and evaluation EC-37 arriving at Davis-Monthan Air Force Base, Arizona, 17 August 2022.

On 7 September 2017, the US Air Force awarded L3 Technologies (now L3Harris) a contract to replace the EC-130H Compass Call with an aircraft based on the Gulfstream G550. The new aircraft was expected to "re-host" up to 70% of the mission equipment currently used on the EC-130H.

On 23 October 2018, Secretary of the Air Force, Heather Wilson, approved Air Combat Command's request to replace the EC-130H Compass Call aircraft from the 55th Electronic Combat Group (ECG) located at Davis-Monthan AFB, Arizona, with EA-37B aircraft (then known as EC-37B). The basing decision memorandum was signed on 15 November 2018. The first airframe was delivered to the air force in September 2023 for evaluation and testing.

On 23 August 2024, the first ready aircraft (serial number 19-5591) was delivered to Davis-Monthan AFB to begin pilot training.

The aircraft's first mission training sortie was flown on 2 May 2025 by the 43rd Electronic Combat Squadron out of Offutt Air Force Base, Nebraska.

While open-source flight tracking and aviation observers tied the EA-37B's use to the 2026 United States intervention in Venezuela, its first confirmed combat deployment occurred in the Middle East as part of the 2026 Iran war.

== Designation ==
Originally designated EC-37B, as an electronic warfare version of the C-37B transport jet under the tri-service aircraft designation system. The designation was officially changed to EA-37B on 14 November 2023 to better reflect the aircraft's role and capabilities although the name change had been hinted at before. The new designation does however conflict with that of the unrelated A-37 Dragonfly, itself a non-systematic designation.

== Operators ==
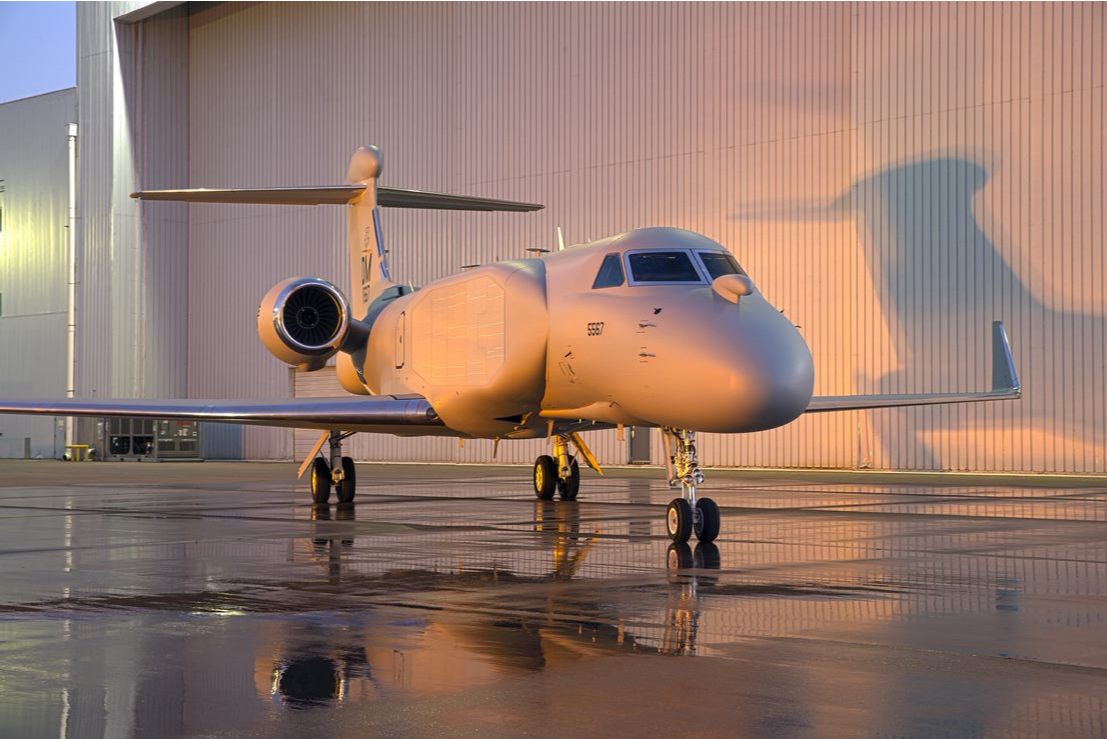
EA-37B

United States Air Force — 10 aircraft ordered, 5 delivered as of May 2025. Operated by the 55th Electronic Combat Group, a part of Air Combat Command.

Italian Air Force — Ordered two EA-37B Electronic Attack mission system packages, which will be used to convert two Gulfstream G550 into EA-37B.

== Specifications ==
Data from Air Combat Command factsheet: EA-37B Compass Call

General characteristics

- Crew: up to nine: two pilots and up to seven crew members according to mission including the mission crew commander (electronic warfare officer), weapon system officer (electronic warfare officer), mission crew supervisor (experienced cryptologic linguist), analysis operators (linguists), one acquisition operator and/or an airborne maintenance technician.
- Length: 96 ft 5 in (29.39 m)
- Wingspan: 93 ft 6 in (28.50 m)
- Height: 25 ft 10 in (7.87 m)
- Empty weight: 48,300 lb (21,909 kg)
- Max takeoff weight: 98,000 lb (44,452 kg)
- Fuel capacity: 41,300 lbs
- Powerplant: 2 × Rolls Royce BR700-710 C4-11 turbofan, 15,385 lbf (68.44 kN) thrust each

Performance

- Maximum speed: Mach 0.82
- Range: 4,410 mi (7,100 km, 3,830 nmi)
- Service ceiling: 45,000 ft (14,000 m)

== See also ==
- Gulfstream G550
- Hava SOJ
- EC-130 Compass Call
- EL/W-2085
- MC-55A Peregrine
