= 55th Electronic Combat Group =

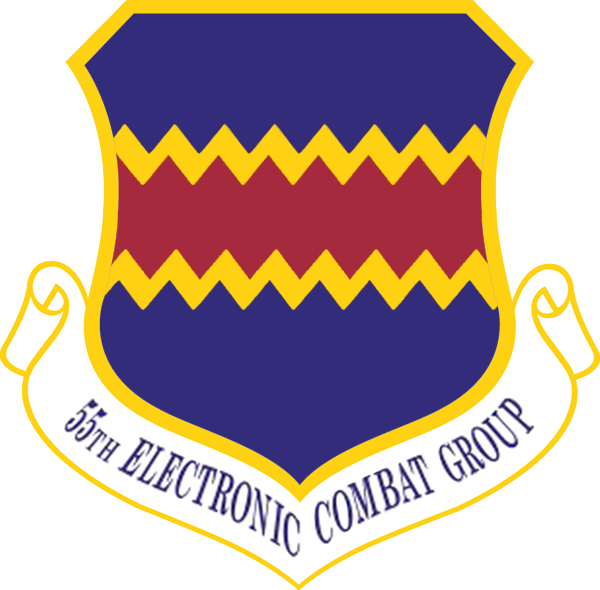
- Insignia of the group
- Country: United States
- Branch: United States Air Force
- Type: Electronic Combat Group
- Size: Unknown
- Garrison/HQ: Davis-Monthan Base, United States
- Engagements: Cold War; Panama Invasion; Operation Provide Comfort; Gulf War; Operation Uphold Democracy; Bosnian War; NATO intervention in Bosnia and Herzegovina; Operation Deny Flight; Operation Deliberate Force; Operation Decisive Edge; Operation Vigilant Warrior; War on terror; War in Afghanistan; Iraq War

Commanders
- Group Commander: Colonel Jeremy R. Smith
- Senior Enlisted Leader: Chief Master Sergeant Brandon L. Vath

The 55th Electronic Combat Group, located at Davis-Monthan Air Force Base, provides combat-ready aircraft, crews, maintenance, and operational support to combatant commanders. The group is a Geographically Separated Unit which falls under the command of the 55th Wing at Offutt Air Force Base. The group also plans and executes information operations, including information warfare and electronic attack, in support of theatre campaign plans.

== History ==
The unit provides combat-ready EA-37B Compass Call aircraft, crews, maintenance, and operational support to combatant commanders. Members of the group conduct EA-37B Compass Call aircrew initial qualification and difference training for 20 aircrew specialities and support operational and force development testing and evaluation for new aircraft systems.

Beginning 23 August 2024, the first EA-37B Compass Call aircraft was delivered to the 43rd ECS. This new Compass Call aircraft will replace the EC-130H aircraft fleet, with 10 total EA-37B aircraft planned for delivery.

== Structure ==
=== 41st and 43d Electronic Combat Squadrons ===
The 41st Electronic Combat Squadron was activated in July 1980, and uniformly, the 43rd Electronic Combat Squadron was activated in April 1992.

Both squadrons provide vital capabilities in electronic warfare for the Air Force and are poised for immediate deployment to specific theatre contingencies. The unit's combat missions are to support tactical air, ground, and naval operations by confusing the enemy's defences and disrupting its command as well as control capabilities.

These squadrons operate the EA-37B Compass Call, the aircraft are modified for missions with electronic countermeasure systems, specialising in jamming equipment, the capability to aerial refuel, and upgraded engines and avionics. The squadrons have participated in operations such as Southern Watch, Just Cause, Desert Shield, Desert Storm, Uphold Democracy, Deny Flight, Vigilant Warrior, Provide Comfort, Decisive Edge, Deliberate Force, Enduring Freedom, and Iraqi Freedom.

=== 755th Aircraft Maintenance Squadron ===
The 755th Aircraft Maintenance Squadron provides war-fighting commanders with combat-ready aircraft to expeditiously execute information warfare and electronic attack operations. The squadron plans and executes all on-equipment maintenance actions for the EA-37B Compass Call aircraft, including launch and recovery, scheduled inspections, servicing, and component replacement. Additionally, they also conduct all maintenance training, aircrew debriefing and supply functions.

=== 755th Operations Support Squadron ===
The 755th Operations Support Squadron supports the group's combat missions and contingency taskings. The squadron performs command and control warfare analysis, targeting, and intelligence support and directs operation support functions including weapons and tactics training for all United States Air Force EA-37B Compass Call aircrews. They also conduct initial academic and flying training for 20 crew positions, and 200 students while managing 17 major command syllabi.
