= Lockheed EC-130H Compass Call =

Communications jamming aircraft version of the C-130H Hercules

EC-130H Compass Call
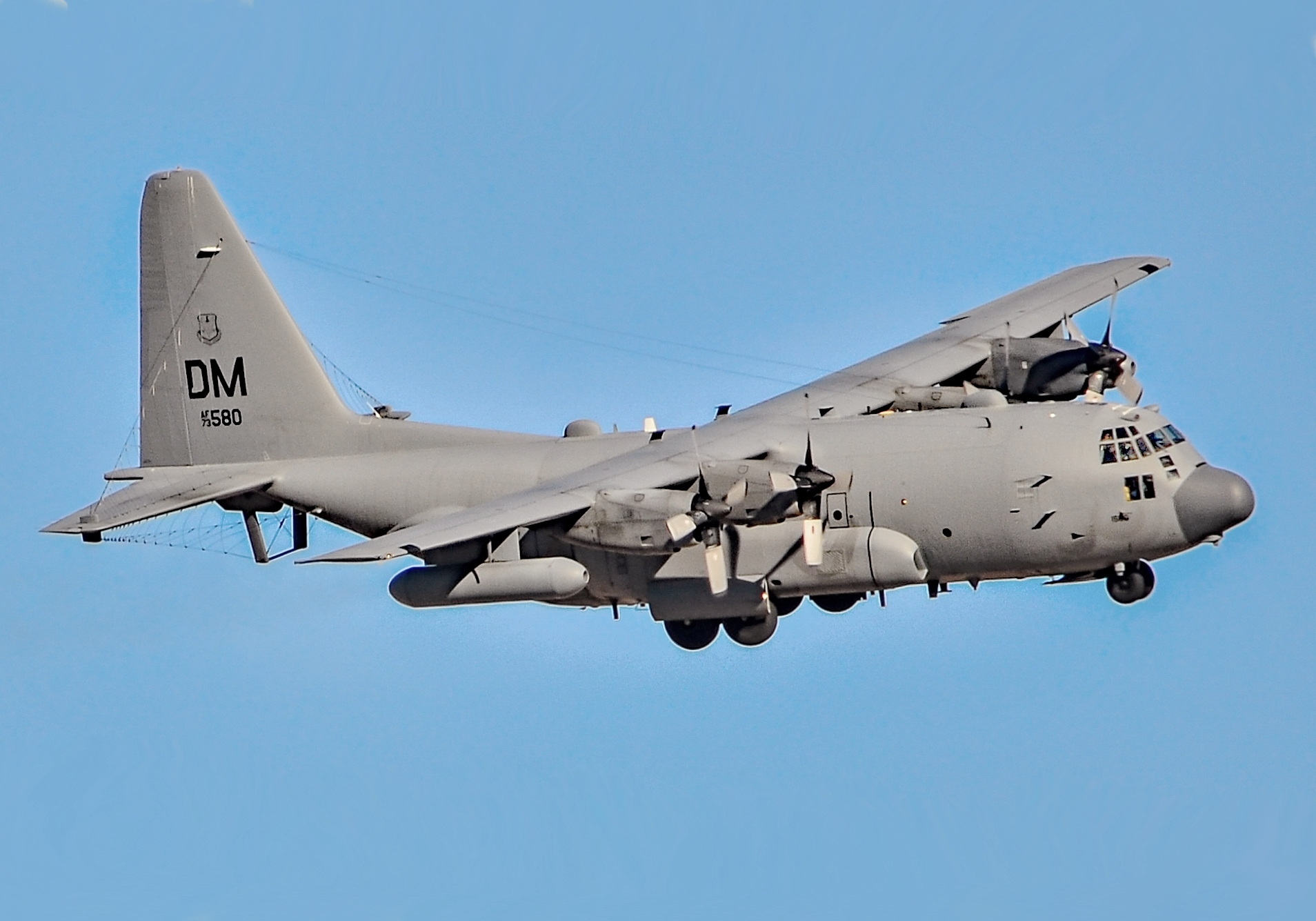
- EC-130H Compass Call

General information
- Type: Electronic warfare, suppression of enemy air defenses, offensive counter-information
- Manufacturer: Lockheed (airframe); BAE Systems (prime mission equipment); L3 Communications (aircraft integration and depot maintenance)
- Status: Retired
- Primary user: United States Air Force
- Number built: 14

History
- Introduction date: 1983 (IOC)
- First flight: 1981
- Retired: 18 September 2026
- Developed from: Lockheed C-130 Hercules

The Lockheed EC-130H Compass Call is an electronic attack aircraft, that was flown by the United States Air Force. Based on the Lockheed C-130 Hercules, the aircraft was heavily modified to disrupt enemy command and control communications, perform offensive counterinformation operations, and carry out other kinds of electronic attacks. Based at Davis-Monthan AFB in Arizona, EC-130Hs are ready to be deployed worldwide at short notice to support U.S. and allied strategic and tactical air, surface, and special operations forces.

The EC-130H was one of the three main U.S. electronic warfare aircraft, along with the Boeing EA-18G Growler, and F-16CJ Fighting Falcon, all of which can suppress enemy air defenses while jamming communications, radar, and command-and-control targets.

In September 2017, the Air Force announced that L3 Technologies will serve as the lead systems integrator for a future Compass Call aircraft based on the Gulfstream G550 business jet. The new Compass Call platform was designated as EA-37B by Air Combat Command on November 14, 2023. The EC-130H is based on the C-130 Hercules, which is a mid-sized four turboprop engine military transport originally developed in the 1950s, but has been upgraded many times and been the basis for many specialized versions, including for electronic warfare (see Lockheed EC-130).

== Design ==
=== Crew ===
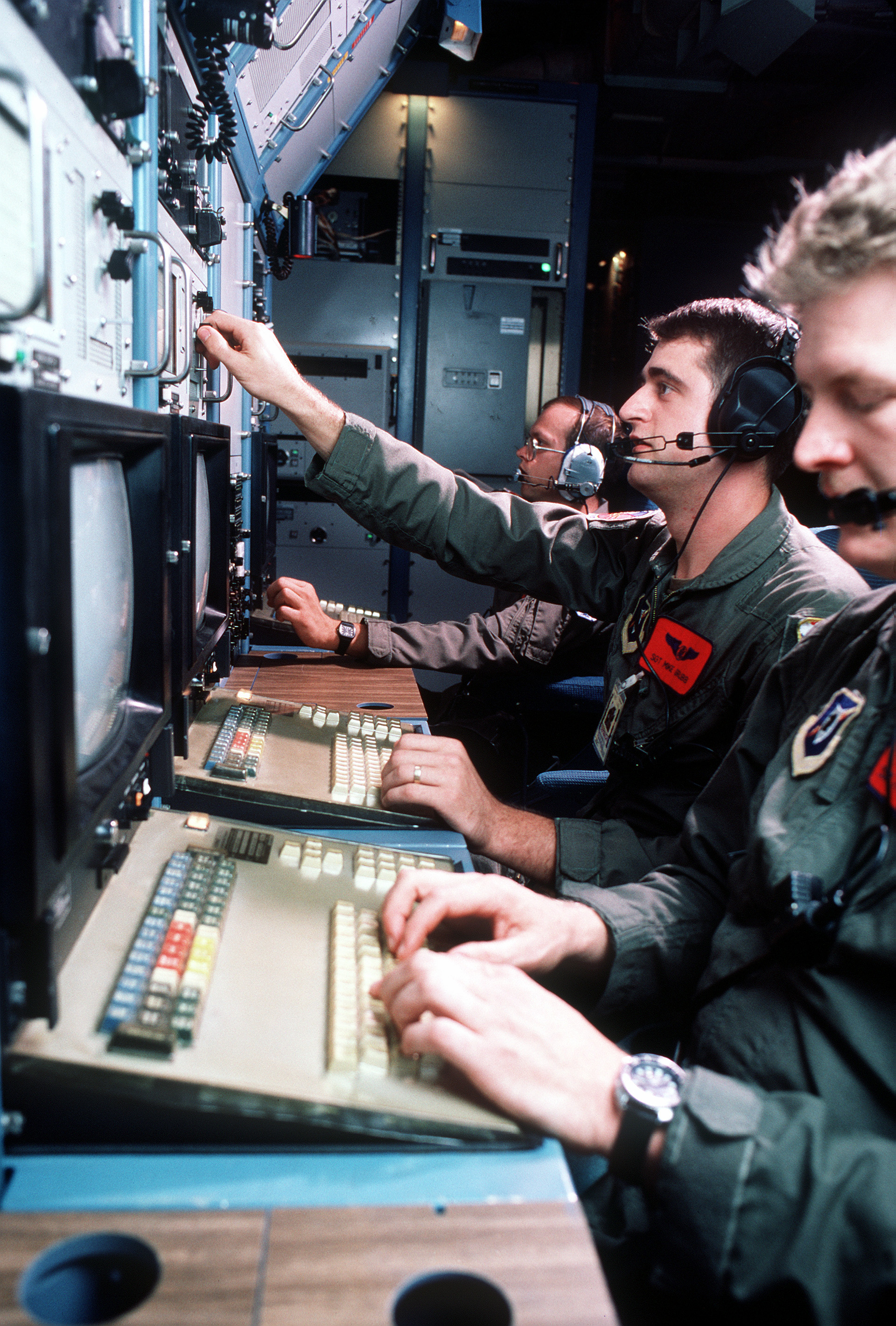
Compass Call crew, 1989

The EC-130H aircraft carries a combat crew of 13 people. Four members handle aircraft flight and navigation (aircraft commander, co-pilot, navigator, and flight engineer), while nine members operate and employ the EA mission equipment permanently integrated into the cargo/mission compartment. The mission crew includes the mission crew commander (electronic warfare officer), weapon system officer (electronic warfare officer), mission crew supervisor (an experienced cryptologic linguist), four analysis operators (linguists), one acquisition operator, and an airborne maintenance technician.

=== Aircraft ===
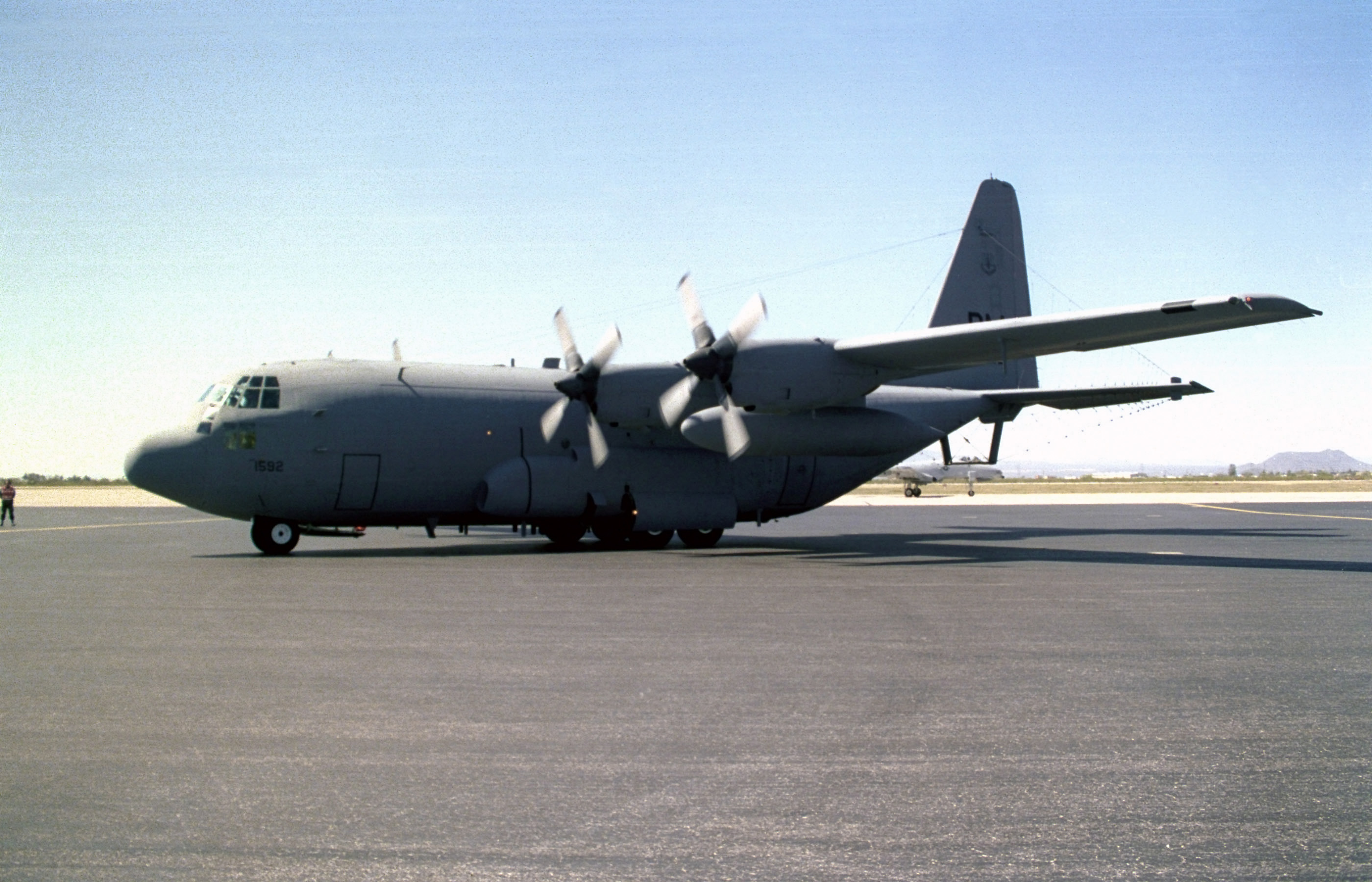
A new EC-130H Compass Call Block 30 arrives at Davis-Monthan Air Force Base, Arizona in 1997

The EC-130H fleet is composed of a mix of Baseline 1 and 2 aircraft.

The Block 35 Baseline 1 EC-130H provides the Air Force with additional capabilities to jam communication, Early Warning/Acquisition radar, and navigation systems through higher effective radiated power, extended frequency range, and insertion of digital signal processing compared to earlier EC-130Hs.

Delivery of Baseline-2 provides the Air Force with the equivalent of a "fifth generation electronic attack capability," providing improved aircraft performance and survivability.

A majority of the improvements found in the EC-130H Compass Call Baseline-2 are classified modifications to the mission system that enhance precision and increase attack capabilities.

== Operational history ==
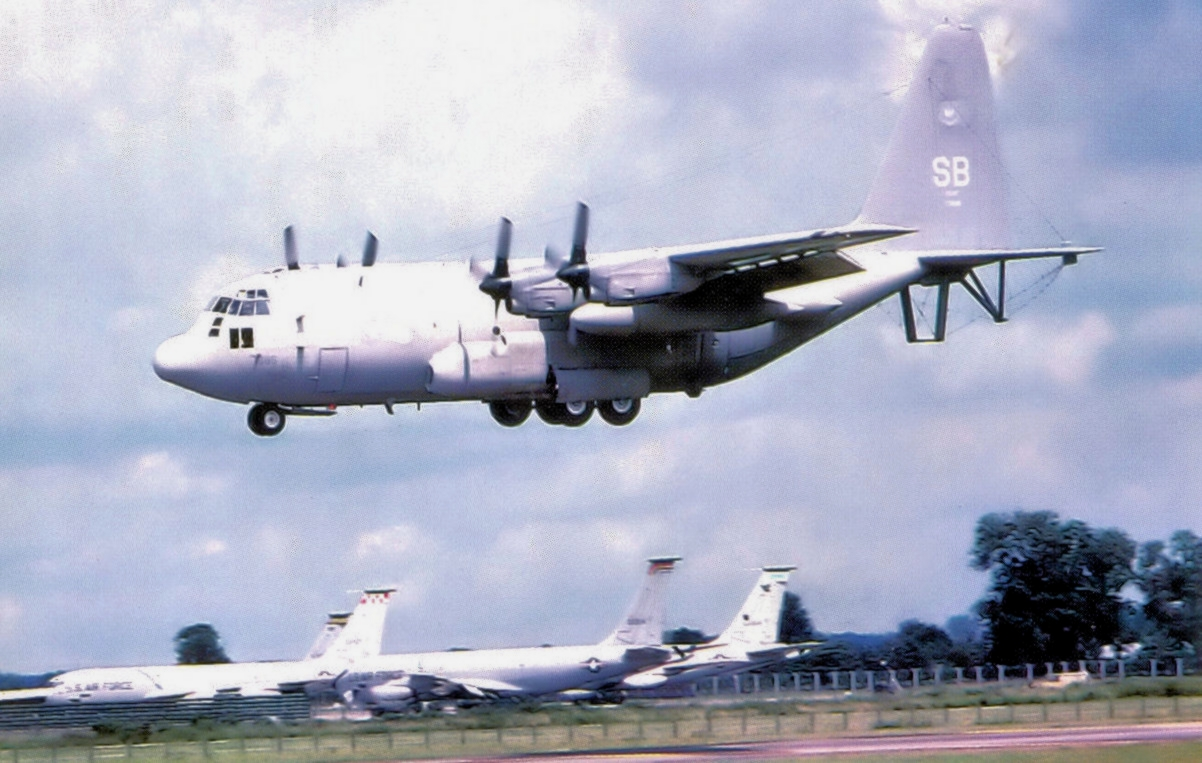
EC-130H Compass Call lands at Sembach Airbase, West Germany in 1986

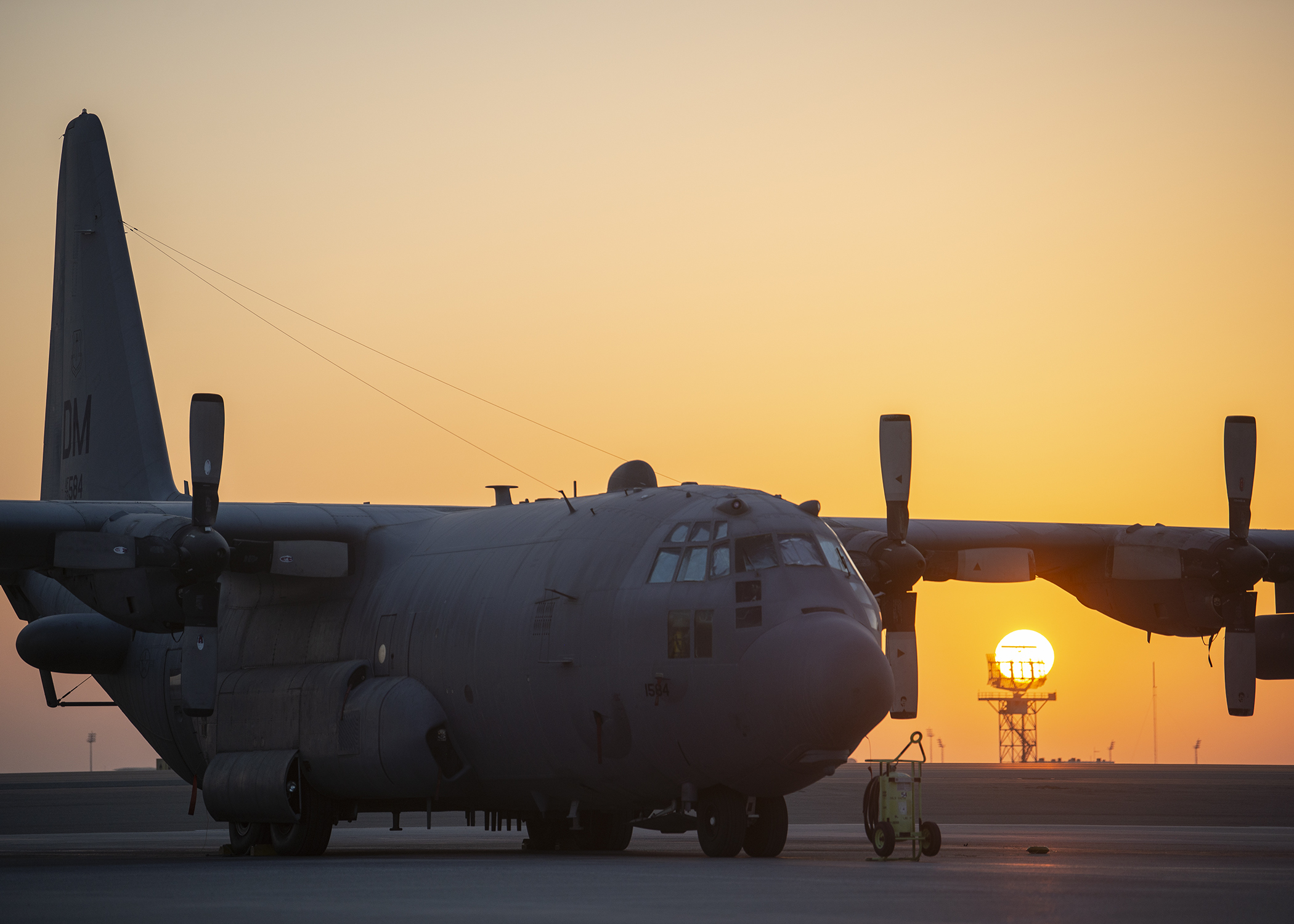
EC-130H in 2020

The Compass Call had its first flight in 1981, was delivered to the Air Force in 1982, and reached initial operating capability in 1983.

All EC-130H Compass Call aircraft are assigned to Air Combat Command. The EC-130H is operated by the 55th Electronic Combat Group (ECG) consisting of two operational squadrons (41st and 43rd Electronic Combat Squadron (ECS)), a formal training unit (the 42nd ECS), the 755th Operations Support Squadron (OSS), and the 755th Aircraft Maintenance Squadron (AMXS). The 55th ECG is a tenant unit of the 355th Fighter Wing at Davis-Monthan AFB, Arizona. Although located at Davis-Monthan, the group reports to the 55th Wing at Offutt AFB, Nebraska.

Compass Call has been used in Yugoslavia, Haiti, Panama, Iraq, Afghanistan, and elsewhere.

From 2002 to 2015, EC-130Hs participating in Operation Enduring Freedom - Afghanistan and Operation Freedom's Sentinel flew over 40,000 hours during 6,900 combat sorties.

On 15 January 2020, the first EC-130H Compass Call (serial number 73-01587) was retired from active service. The aircraft was the first EC-130H Compass Call delivered to the Air Force in March 1982.

The EC‑130H continued to operate into the mid‑2020s, but fleet numbers declined significantly as newer systems were introduced. In 2024, only a handful of the aircraft remained operational, and plans called for further retirements with mission equipment being transitioned to the next‑generation platform.

In 2025, the U.S. Air Force announced acquisition of additional next‑generation electronic‑attack aircraft — the EA‑37B Compass Call — to eventually replace the aging EC‑130H fleet, as this newer platform is expected to provide improved survivability, mission capability, and updated electronic warfare systems. In September 2026, the EC-130H Compass Call 73-1590 made its last flight under callsign VOLT1 in company with its replacement EA-37B.

== Operators ==
United States

- United States Air Force
  - Air Combat Command
    - 55th Electronic Combat Group

== Specifications (EC-130H) ==
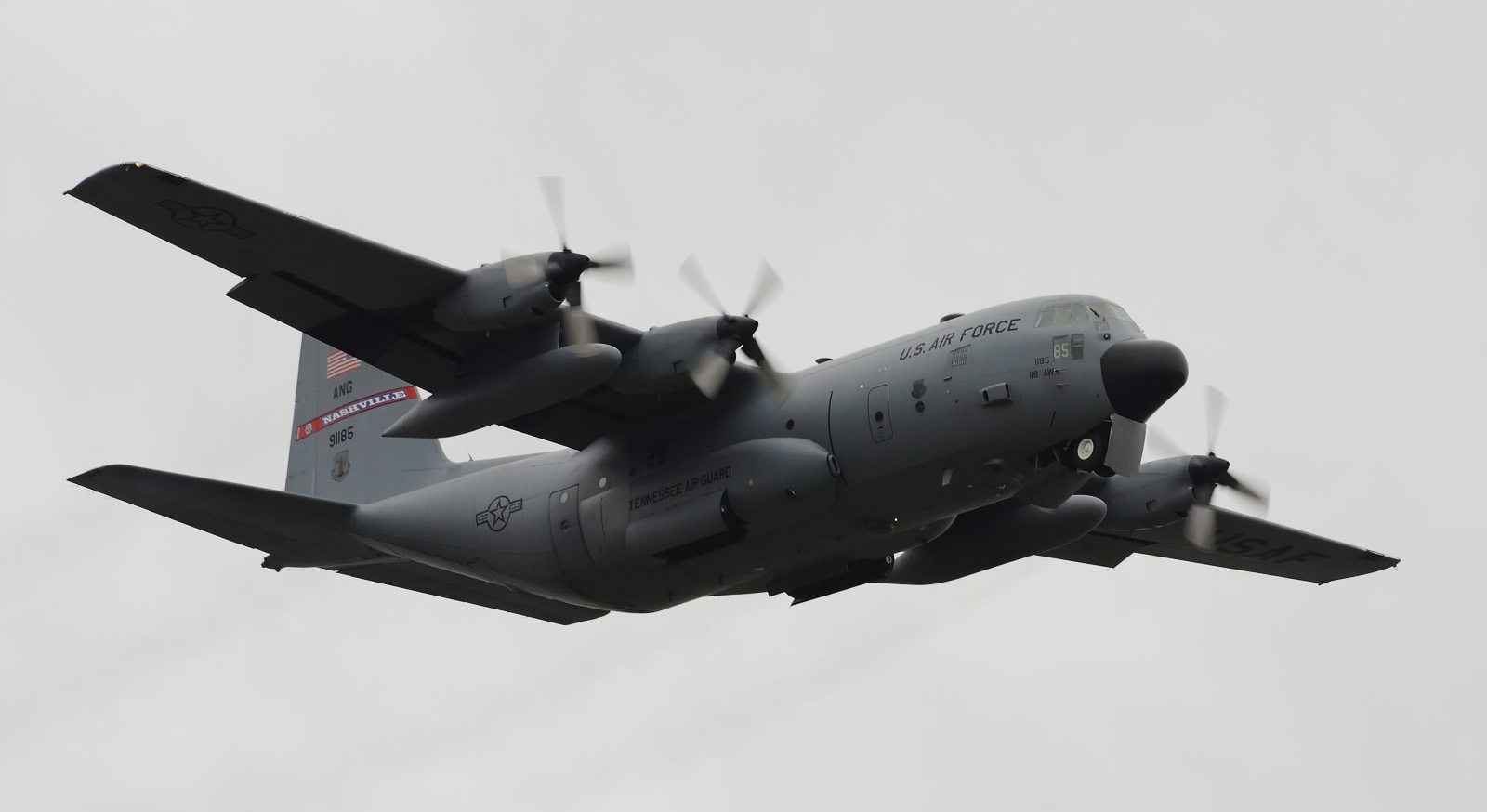
Tennessee Air National Guard EC-130H Compass Call

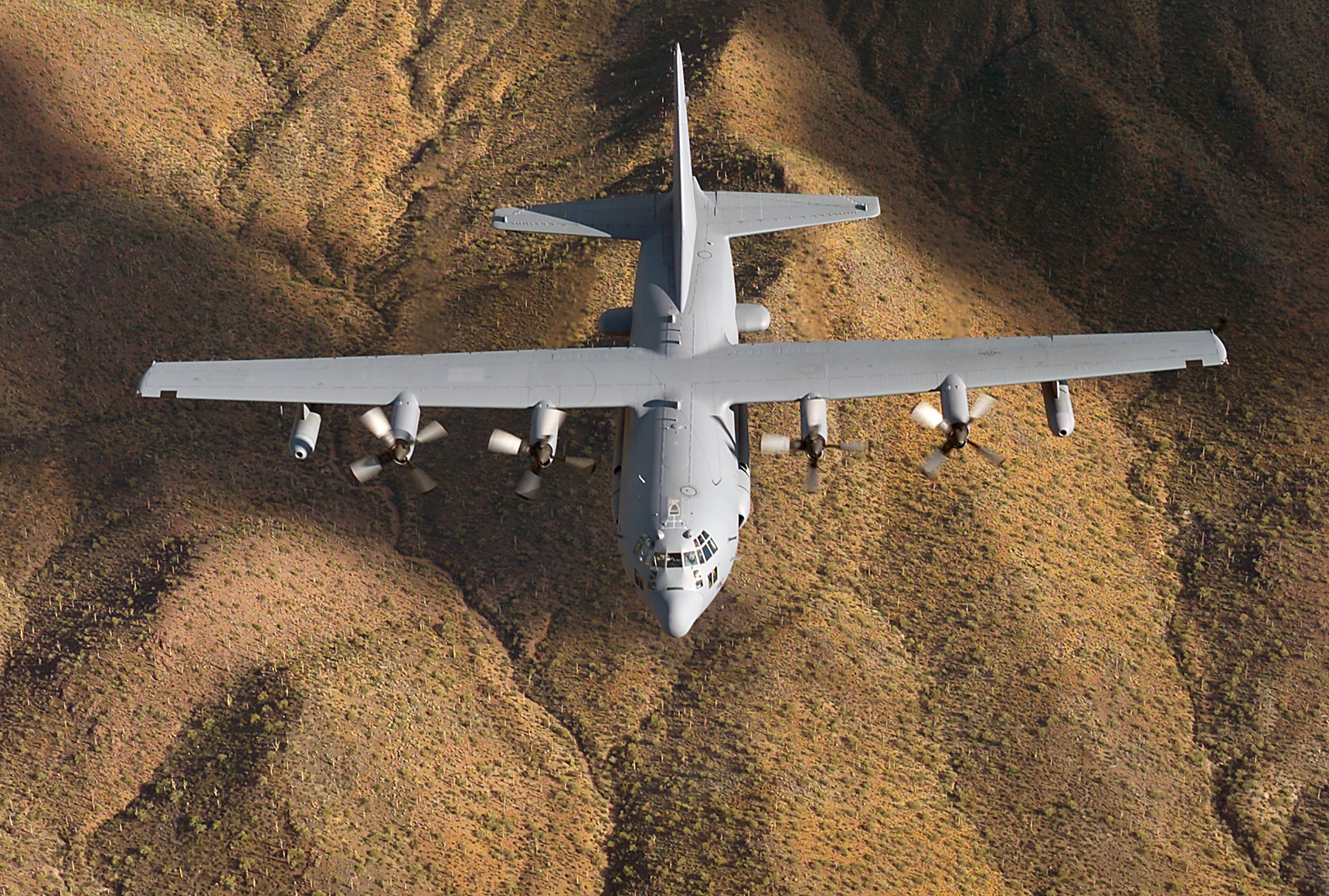
EC-130H Compass Call, 2007

Data from Air Force Link: EC-130H Compass Call

General characteristics

- Crew: 13
- Length: 98 ft 9 in (30.10 m)
- Wingspan: 132 ft 7 in (40.41 m)
- Height: 38 ft 3 in (11.66 m)
- Wing area: 37 sq ft (3.4 m^{2})
- Airfoil: root: NACA 64A318; tip: NACA 64A412
- Empty weight: 101,000 lb (45,813 kg)
- Max takeoff weight: 155,000 lb (70,307 kg)
- Fuel capacity: around 100000 liters
- Powerplant: 4 × Allison T56-A-15 turboprop engines, 4,591 shp (3,424 kW) each
- Propellers: 4-bladed constant-speed fully feathering reversible propellers, 13 ft 6 in (4.11 m) diameter

Performance

- Cruise speed: 300 mph (480 km/h, 260 kn) (M0.5)
- Range: 2,641 mi (4,250 km, 2,295 nmi)
- Service ceiling: 25,000 ft (7,600 m)

== See also ==
Related development

- C-130 Hercules
- EC-130E Rivet Rider
- EC-130J Commando Solo
- MC-130H Combat Talon II
