= 355th Wing =

US Air Force unit

355th Wing

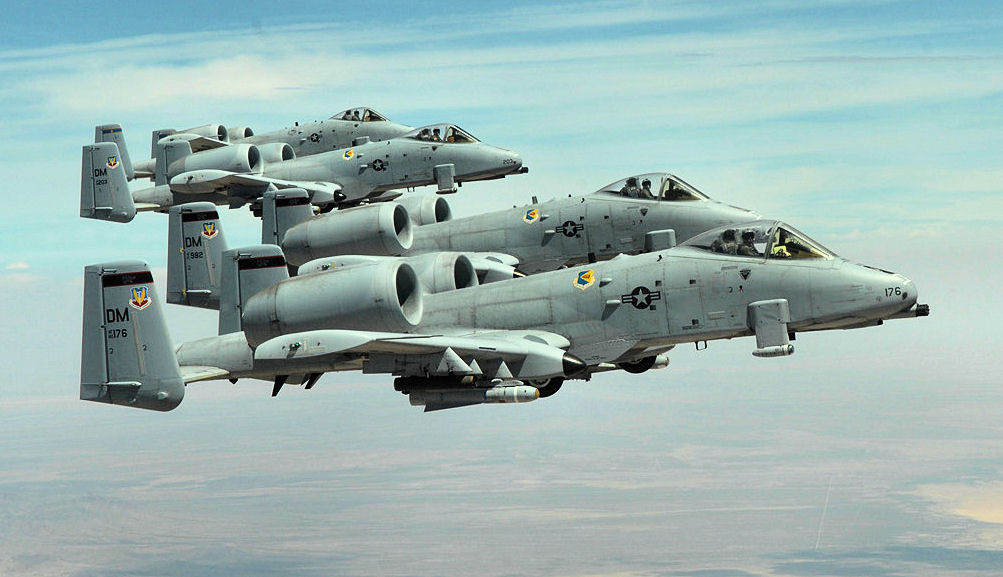
- Four Fairchild Republic A-10C Thunderbolt IIs from the 355th Operations Group
- Active: 1942–1946; 1955–1958; 1962–1970; 1971–present
- Country: United States
- Branch: United States Air Force
- Role: Fighter
- Part of: Air Combat Command: Fifteenth Air Force
- Garrison/HQ: Davis–Monthan Air Force Base
- Nicknames: Steeple Morden Strafers (WW II); PACAF Pride (Vietnam)
- Motto: Our Might Always
- Decorations: Distinguished Unit Citation; Presidential Unit Citation; Air Force Outstanding Unit Award with Combat V device Republic of Vietnam Gallantry Cross with palm

Commanders
- Current commander: Colonel Jose Cabrera
- Notable commanders: John D. W. Corley; Michael Dugan; Claiborne H. Kinnard Jr. George B. Simler; Bud Anderson; Everett W. Stewart; Robert R. Scott

Insignia
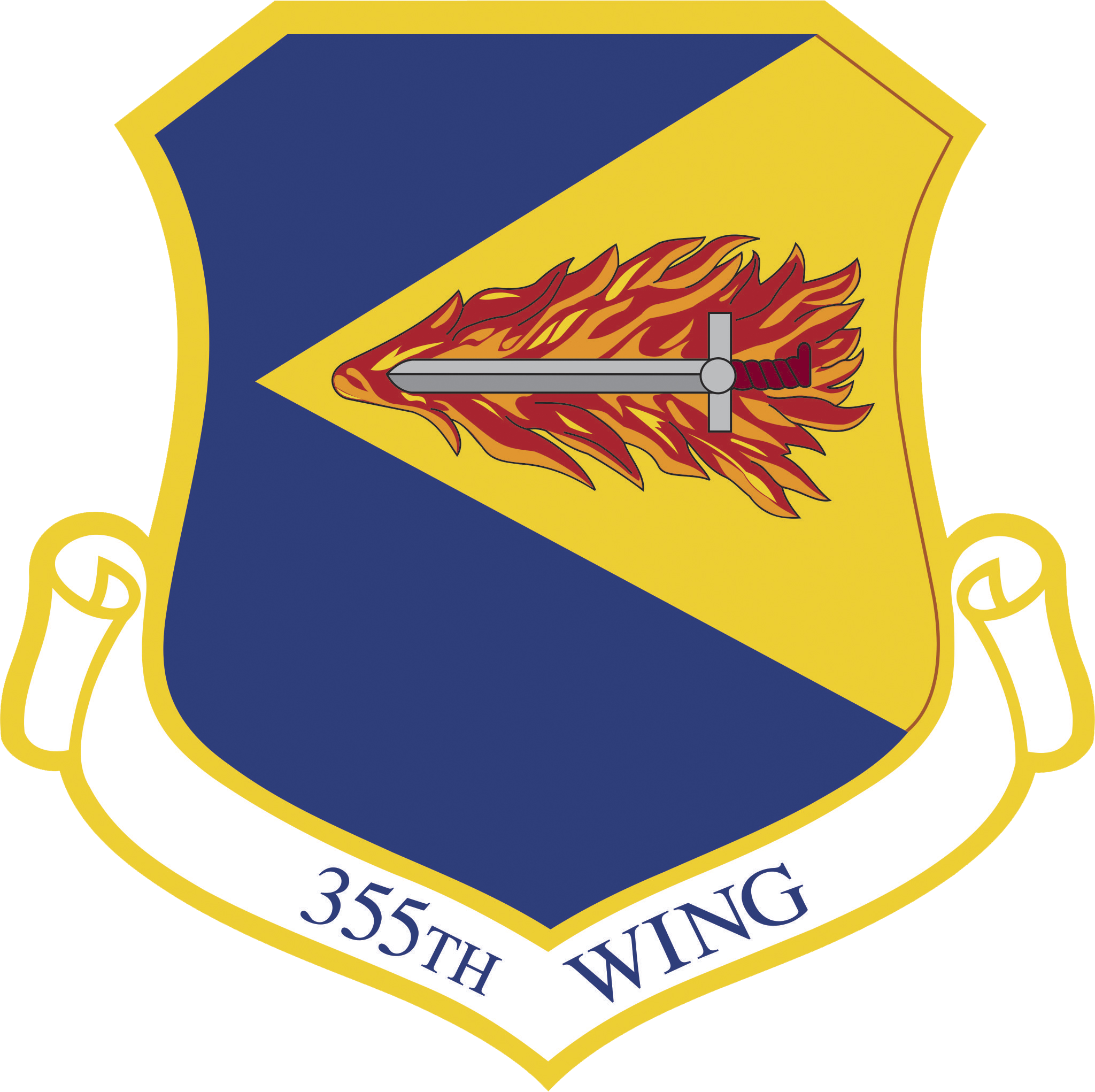
- 355th Wing emblem (Approved 16 March 1943)

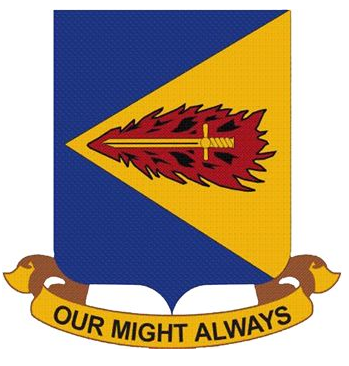
- Original form of the emblem as approved

The 355th Wing (355 WG) is a United States Air Force unit assigned to the Air Combat Command's Fifteenth Air Force. It is stationed at Davis–Monthan Air Force Base in Tucson, Arizona, which formerly operated the A-10 Thunderbolt II. The wing's mission is to provide close air support (CAS), air interdiction (AI), forward air control (FAC), combat search and rescue (CSAR), ground-based tactical air control, and airbase operations.

== History ==
=== World War II ===
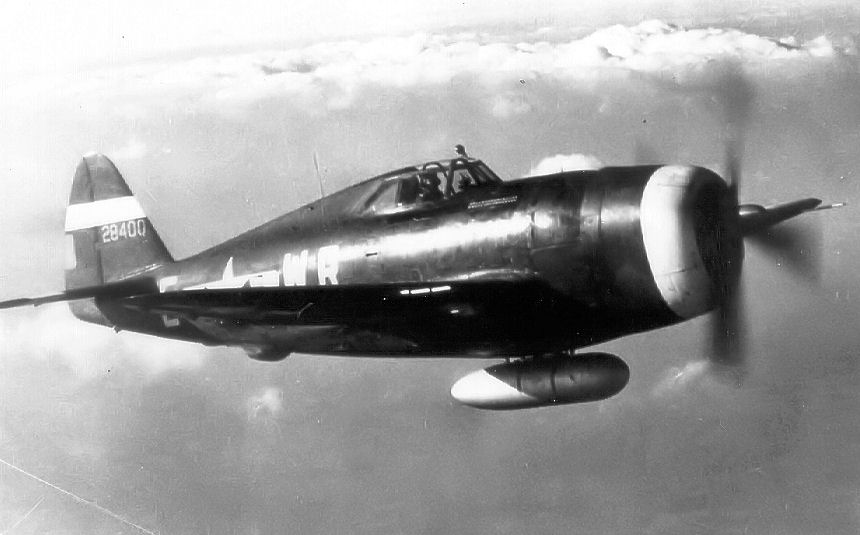
354th Fighter Squadron P-47 (Note: Aircraft is Republic P-47D-2-RE Thunderbolt serial 42-8400. Photograph probably taken from a B-17 or B-24 bomber with the fighter on an escort mission inbound to a target in Occupied Europe in 1943. Note the external auxiliary fuel tank.)

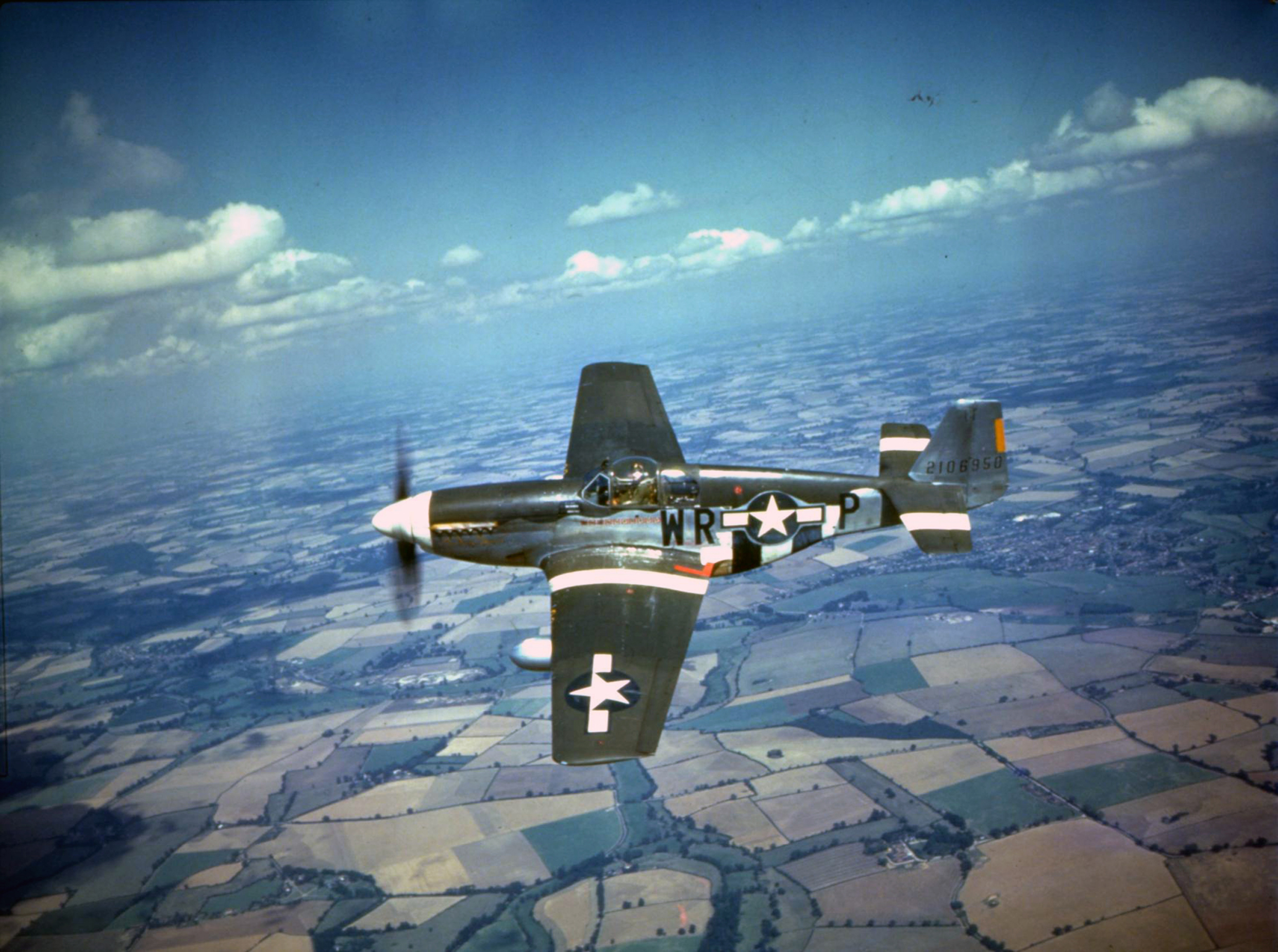
354th Fighter Squadron P-51B (Note: Aircraft is North American P-51B-15-NA Mustang serial 42-105950. Note the D-Day invasion markings and the English "Malcolm" bubble canopy installed for better pilot visibility)

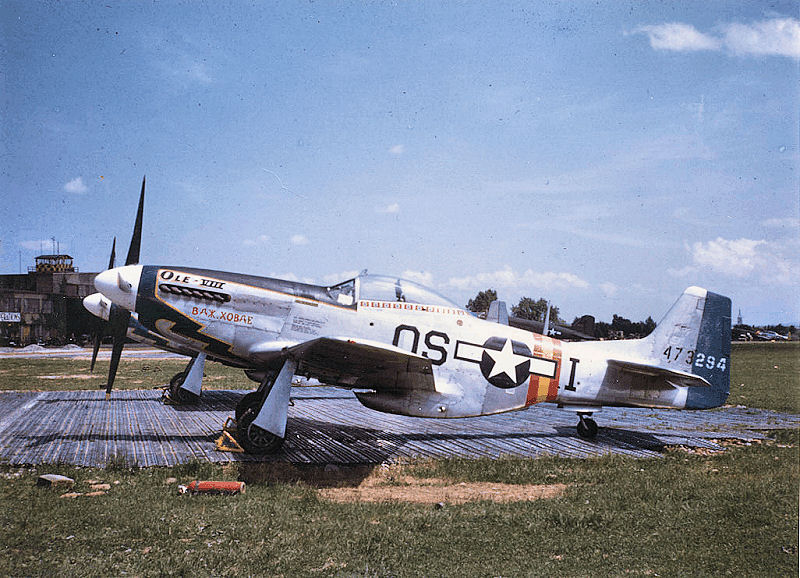
357th Fighter Squadron P-51D (Note: Aircraft is North American P-51D-5-NA Mustang serial 44-73294 with 10 enemy kills noted. Taken at Gablingen, Germany in 1945. Note the postwar orange/yellow occupation stripes on the fuselage)

The 355th Fighter Group was first activated 12 November 1942. Originally equipped with Republic P-47 Thunderbolts, the group began using North American P-51 Mustangs in Spring 1944.

The group was under the command of the 65th Fighter Wing of the VIII Fighter Command, Eighth Air Force. The aircraft group identification was white spinners and cowling bands.

The group consisted of the following squadrons:

- 354th Fighter Squadron (WR)
- 357th Fighter Squadron (OS)
- 358th Fighter Squadron (YF)

The 355 FG flew its first combat mission, a fighter sweep over Belgium, on 14 September 1943 and afterwards served primarily as escort for Boeing B-17 Flying Fortress/B-24 bombers that attacked industrial areas of Berlin, marshalling yards at Karlsruhe, an airfield at Neuberg, oil refineries at Misburg, synthetic oil plants at Gelsenkirchen, locks at Minden, and other objectives. The group also flew fighter sweeps, area patrols, and bombing missions, striking such targets as air parks, locomotives, bridges, radio stations, and armoured cars.

The 355th quickly gained acclaim as the "Steeple Morden Strafers," a reference to its base in England and its lethal accuracy at low level. The fighter group destroyed or damaged 1,500 enemy planes, making it the top strafing outfit in the VIII Fighter Command during World War II.

On 5 April 1944, shortly after converting from Thunderbolts to Mustangs, the group successfully bombed and strafed German airfields during a snow squall, only 2 aircraft were lost during this mission for which the group was awarded a Distinguished Unit Citation.

The group provided fighter cover for Allied forces landing in Normandy on 6 June 1944, and afterwards hit transportation facilities to cut enemy supply lines. Hit fuel dumps, locomotives, and other targets in support of ground forces during the breakthrough at Saint-Lô in July.

The 355th Fighter Group flew its last combat mission on 25 April 1945. On 3 July the group transferred to Gablingen, Germany for duty with United States Air Forces in Europe as part of the army of occupation. Transferred, without personnel and equipment, to Mitchel Field New York on 1 August 1946. It was inactivated on 20 November due to the Air Force's policy of retaining only low-numbered groups on active duty after the war, and its mission, personnel and equipment transferred to the 14th Fighter Group which was simultaneously activated.

Aces of the 355th Fighter Group

Name and Rank	Number of Aircraft Destroyed	Note
Capt. Henry W. Brown	14.20	
Maj. William J. Hovde	10.50	(Note: Only 355th FG pilot to become Ace in a day (5 December 1944))
Lt. Col. Claiborne H. Kinnard Jr.	8.00	
Lt. Col. John L. Elder Jr	8.00	
Lt. Col. Gordon M. Graham	7.00	
Maj. Bert W. Marshall Jr	7.00	
Capt. Robert E. Woody	7.00	
Lt. Col. Everett W. Stewart	7.00	
Maj. Fred R. Haviland Jr.	6.00	
Maj. Henry S. Billie	6.00	
Capt. Norman E. Olson	6.00	(Note: Only ace KIA in the 355th FG during the entire war and the only P-47 ace of 355th FG)
Maj. Norman J. Fortier	5.83	
Capt. Walter J. Koraleski (Note: Koraleski subsequently shortened his last name and legally changed it to "Koral")	5.53	
Maj. Charles W. Lenfest	5.50	
Capt. Leslie D. Minchew	5.50	
Capt. James E. Duffy Jr	5.20	
Capt. William J. Cullerton	5.00	
Capt. Royce W. Priest	5.00	
Lt. Col. Raymond B. Myers	5.00	
Capt. James N. McElroy	5.00	
1st. Lt. William E. Whalen	5.00	(Note: Part of the 2nd Scouting Force within the 355th FG) (Note: Also credited with 1 aerial victory while serving with 4th FG)
1st. Lt. Charles D. Hauver	5.00	

=== Cold War ===
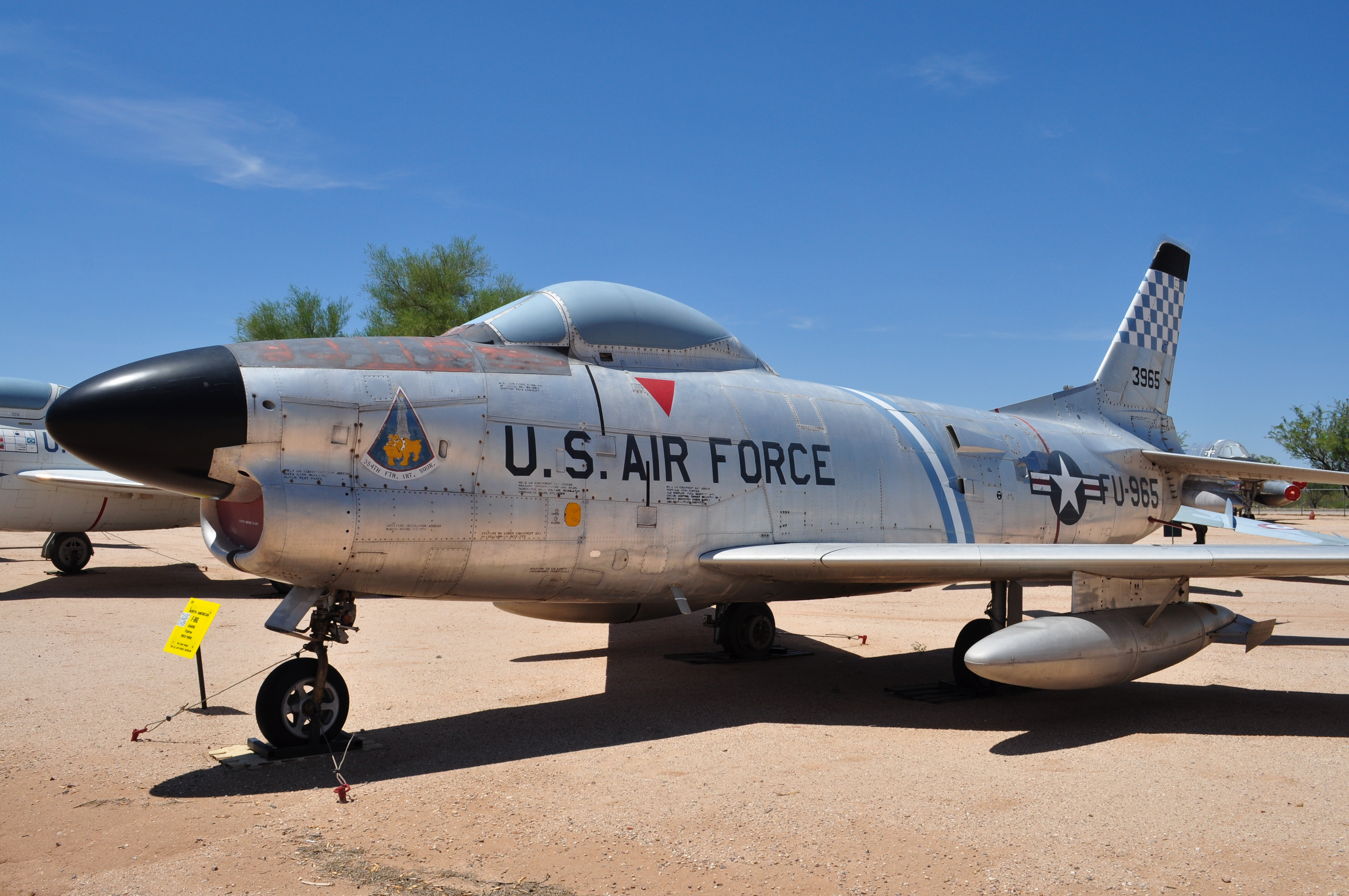
F-86 of the 354th FIS (Note: Aircraft is at Pima Air Museum. Serial 53-965, it is identified as a North American F-86L, although there is no indication the 354th ever upgraded to the data link equipped version of the "Dog Sabre.")

In August 1955, the group was redesignated the 355th Fighter Group (Air Defense) and reactivated as part of Air Defense Command's Project Arrow, which was designed to bring back on the active list the fighter units which had compiled memorable records in the two world wars. The group replaced the 516th Air Defense Group and assumed its mission, personnel and equipment at McGhee Tyson Airport, near Knoxville Tennessee. The 516th's 469th Fighter-Interceptor Squadron was reassigned to the group, while the 354th Fighter-Interceptor Squadron moved on paper from Oxnard Air Force Base, California to take over the aircraft of the 460th Fighter-Interceptor Squadron, which moved without personnel or equipment to Portland International Airport, Oregon. The group served as the United States Air Force host organization for active duty units at McGhee Tyson and was assigned a number of maintenance and support units to carry out this function.

The 354th and 469th Squadrons both flew the radar equipped and Mighty Mouse rocket armed North American F-86D Sabre. The group focused on defending the Oak Ridge atomic plant and Alcoa aluminum production site. In July 1957 the 355th was reduced to a single fighter squadron when the 469th was inactivated. Regular Air Force operations at McGhee Tyson ended on 8 January 1958 when the 355th Group and the 354th Squadron inactivated, and the base was turned over to the Tennessee Air National Guard, which had organized the 134th Fighter Group there the previous month.

=== Vietnam era ===
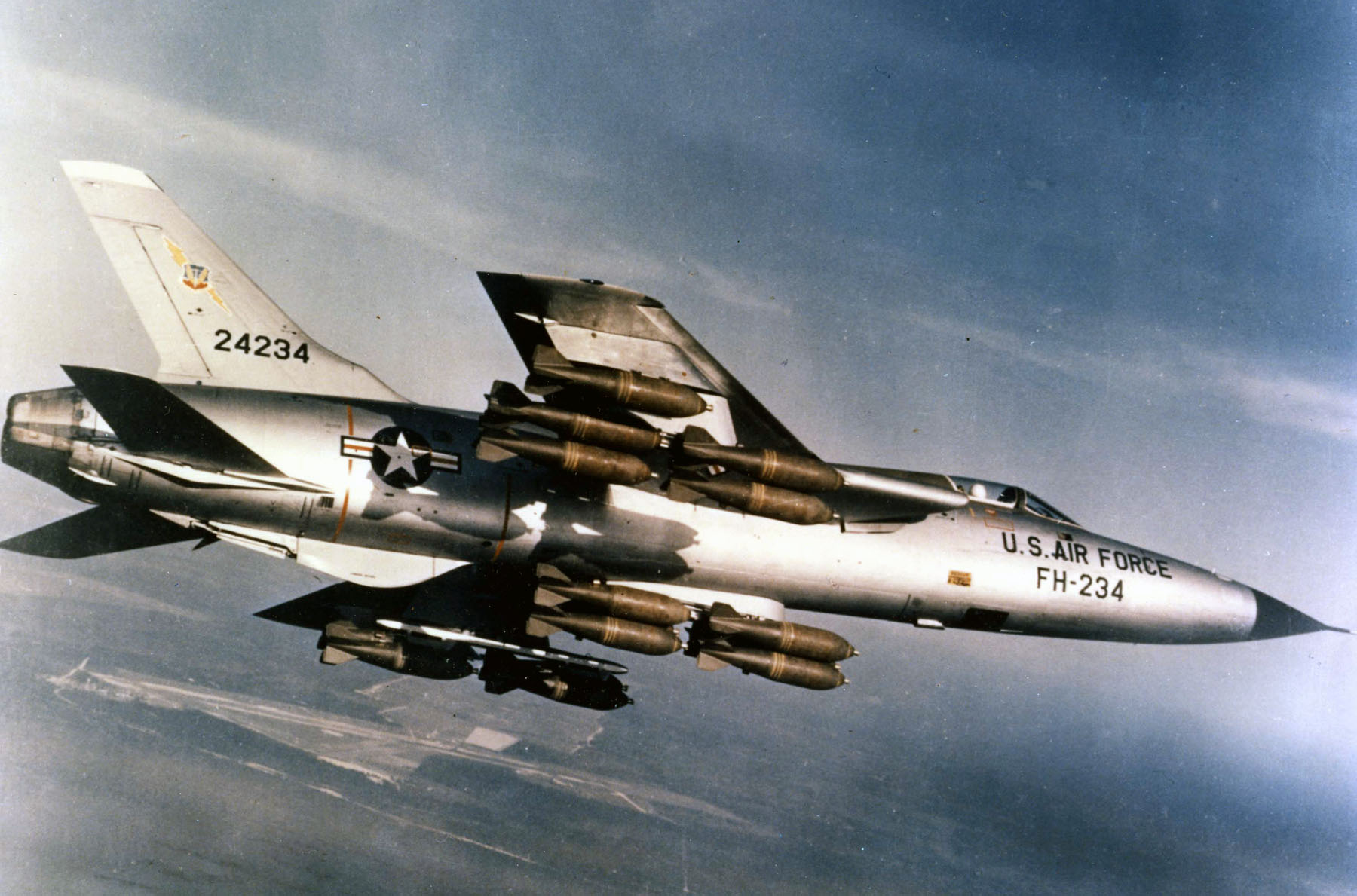
355th TFW F-105D (Note: Aircraft is Republic F-105D-30-RE Thunderchief serial 62-4234 with a load of 750 lb bombs. Note the natural aluminum finish, photo probably taken in 1965 or 1966 before USAF aircraft adapted the Southeast Asia camouflage. This aircraft was lost on 24 December 1968 over Laos.)

On 13 April 1962 the 355th Tactical Fighter Wing was established and activated at George AFB, California, being equipped with the new F-105 Thunderchief. After a period of organization at George, the wing was assigned to McConnell AFB, Kansas, becoming the host unit at the base.

The unit transferred to the Takhli Royal Thai Air Force Base in Thailand in 1965. During the next five years, it flew more than 101,000 sorties over North Vietnam, dropping 202,596 tons of bombs and destroying 12,675 targets. The wing's pilots were credited with twenty airborne kills of MiG aircraft and eight aircraft destroyed on the ground. Nicknamed "PACAF's Pride," the unit received three Presidential Unit Citations and three Air Force Outstanding Unit Awards with the combat "V" device. It is also noteworthy that, of the twelve airmen awarded the Medal of Honor in the Vietnam War, two belonged to the 355th Tactical Fighter Wing: Majors Merlyn H. Dethlefsen and Leo K. Thorsness.

The 355th was inactivated at Takhli on 10 December 1970 as part of the drawdown of US Forces in Southeast Asia in the early 1970s.

The 355th was reactivated at Davis–Monthan Air Force Base in 1971, being assigned to Tactical Air Command. Initially, the wing had four squadrons (333d, 354th, 357th and 358th) equipped with the new A-7D Corsair II ground air support aircraft. It achieved operationally-ready status in 1972. In late 1972, the 354th Tactical Fighter Squadron deployed its Corsairs to Korat Royal Thai Air Force Base, Thailand and was attached to the 354th Tactical Fighter Wing (Forward Echelon), which had deployed to Korat from Myrtle Beach AFB, South Carolina. From Korat, the 354th, and later the 357th, which replaced the 354th TFS in June 1973, conducted combat operations first in South Vietnam, then in 1973, in Cambodia, supporting the Lon Nol Government until 15 August 1973 when US combat operations in Southeast Asia were halted by Congress.

=== Post Vietnam ===
Withdrawing from Thailand in 1974, the wing began to send its Corsairs to the Air National Guard, and transitioning to the new A-10 Thunderbolt II. By 1979, the wing had completely transitioned to the A-10 and achieved operationally ready status. On 1 September 1979, Tactical Air Command took the 355th off deployment status and redesignated it as the 355th Tactical Training Wing becoming the USAF's A-10 Thunderbolt II Operational Training Unit.

In 1984 the 355th Fighter Group was consolidated with the Wing, giving the 355th Tactical Training Wing the history, honors and lineage of the World War II and Cold War organization.

As the wing entered the 1990s, it continued to train A-10 crews for assignments to units in the United States, England, and South Korea. The 355th Wing regularly participated in air support exercises such as Air Warrior and weapons competitions such as Long Rifle, in which it consistently captured top A-10 honors. However, the wing's excellence wasn't limited to the cockpit; in 1990, it received the TAC Commander's Award for top aircraft maintenance, in the A-10 category, for the third consecutive year.

The wing's training program paid off when in 1990 squadrons were deployed to King Fahd International Airport in Saudi Arabia, being assigned to the 354th Tactical Fighter Wing (Provisional) during operation Desert Shield. In 1991 during Operation Desert Storm, when 355th-trained A-10 pilots destroyed 1,000 tanks, 2,000 vehicles, 1,200 artillery pieces, and two helicopters. While the wing as a whole did not deploy to the Persian Gulf, more than 250 members augmented forces in theater and filled shortages in the United States.

=== Davis–Monthan ===
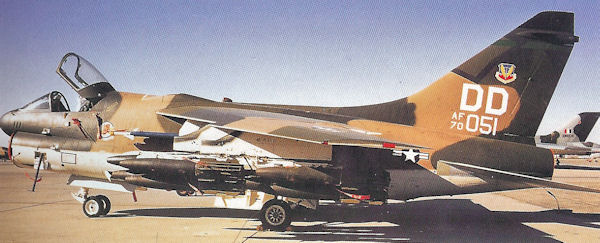
358th TFS A-7D (Note: Aircraft is LTV A-7D-9-CV serial 70-1051 at Davis Monthan AFB, AZ in March 1972. Note the "DD" squadron tail code, rather than the 355th TFW "DM" code adapted in June 1972.)

On 1 October 1991, the 355th Tactical Training Wing was redesignated as the 355th Fighter Wing under the "Objective Wing" concept adapted by the Air Force as the lines between tactical and strategic forces blurred and the Air Force leadership began to merge these forces under Air Combat Command. The flying components of the wing were reassigned to the newly established 355th Operations Group. As part of this restructuring, on 1 May 1992, the 355th became a composite wing, absorbing elements of the 602nd Air Control Wing, the 41st Electronic Combat Squadron, and of most other activities currently operating at the Davis–Monthan Air Force Base. With these diverse units as part of the organization, the designation was changed to the 355th Wing on 1 May 1992.

An era came to a close when on 30 September 2002 the 42d Airborne Command and Control Squadron was designated inactive. The 355th Wing then underwent an extensive reorganization of forces on 1 October 2002. During this reorganization, new squadrons were added to the existing wing structure, while some squadrons were realigned under new group commanders. The 355th Wing also inherited the 48th, 55th, and 79th Rescue Squadrons equipped with HC-130 aircraft and HH-60 helicopters.

Another change saw the 41st and 43d Electronic Combat Squadrons fall under the operational control of the 55th Electronic Combat Group, 55th Wing at Offutt Air Force Base in Nebraska. On 1 October 2003, the three combat search-and-rescue squadrons fell under the command of the 563d Rescue Group. The 355th Fighter Wing was redesignated 355th Wing on 2 January 2019.

In February 2024, the wing retired its first A-10C Thunderbolt II; all are expected to be retired over the next three to five years.

The 355th Wing currently provides air assets to Air Expeditionary unit commanders involved in operations around the globe, as part of the global war on terrorism.

On 29 July 2026, the 355th conducted the wing's final A-10 flight, at Davis–Monthan AFB.

== Component units ==
All units are based at Davis–Monthan AFB, Arizona.

355th Wing Staff

- Headquarters 355th Wing
- 355th Comptroller Squadron

563d Rescue Group

- 48th Rescue Squadron
- 55th Rescue Squadron – HH-60G Pave Hawk
- 68th Rescue Squadron - Guardian Angel Formal Training Unit (FTU)
- 79th Rescue Squadron – HC-130J Combat King II
- 563rd Operations Support Squadron
- 563rd Maintenance Squadron

355th Maintenance Group (355 MXG)

- 355th Aircraft Maintenance Squadron
- 355th Component Maintenance Squadron
- 355th Equipment Maintenance Squadron
- 355th Munitions Squadron
- 79th Rescue Generation Squadron

355th Mission Support Group

- 355th Civil Engineer Squadron
- 355th Communications Squadron
- 355th Contracting Squadron
- 355th Force Support Squadron
- 355th Logistics Readiness Squadron
- 355th Security Forces Squadron

355th Medical Group

- 355th Operational Medical Readiness Squadron
- 355th Healthcare Operations Squadron

== Lineage ==
355th Fighter Group

- Established as the 355th Fighter Group and activated on 12 November 1942

Inactivated on 20 November 1946

- Redesignated 355th Fighter Group (Air Defense) on 20 June 1955

Activated on 18 August 1955
Inactivated on 8 January 1958

- Consolidated with the 355th Tactical Fighter Wing as the 355th Tactical Fighter Wing on 31 January 1984

355th Fighter Wing

- Established as the 355th Tactical Fighter Wing on 13 April 1962 (not organized)

Organized on 8 July 1962
Inactivated on 10 December 1970

- Activated on 1 July 1971

Redesignated 355th Tactical Training Wing on 1 September 1979

- Consolidated with the 355th Fighter Group on 31 January 1984

Redesignated 355th Fighter Wing on 1 October 1991
Redesignated 355th Wing on 1 May 1992
Redesignated 355th Fighter Wing on 26 April 2007
Redesignated 355th Wing on 2 January 2019

=== Assignments ===
- Army Air Force School of Applied Tactics, 12 November 1942
- I Fighter Command, 18 February 1943

Attached to: Philadelphia Fighter Wing, 4 March – 16 June 1943

- VIII Fighter Command, c. 6 July 1943
- 65th Fighter Wing, 18 August 1943

Attached to: 2d Bombardment (later Air) Division, 15 September 1944 – 3 July 1945

- Ninth Air Force, 3 July 1945
- XXIX Tactical Air Command, 18 July 1945
- 70th Fighter Wing, c. 10 August 1945
- 64th Fighter Wing, c. 15 April 1946
- First Air Force, 1 August – 20 November 1946
- 35th Air Division, 20 June 1955

- 58th Air Division, 1 March 1956 – 8 January 1958
- Tactical Air Command, 13 April 1962 (not organized)
- 831st Air Division, 8 July 1962
- 835th Air Division, 21 July 1964
- Thirteenth Air Force, 8 November 1965 – 10 December 1970

Attached to 2d Air Division, 8 November 1965 – 31 March 1966
Attached to Seventh Air Force, 1 April 1966 – 10 December 1970

- Twelfth Air Force, 1 July 1971
- Ninth Air Force, 1 July 1976
- Tactical Training, Davis–Monthan, 1 April 1977
- 836th Air Division, 1 January 1981
- Twelfth Air Force, 1 May 1992 – 20 August 2020
- Fifteenth Air Force, 20 August 2020 – present

=== Components ===
Wings

- 4453d Combat Crew Training Wing: attached 1 July – 30 September 1971.

Groups

- 1st Air Support Group: 15 June 1992 – 1 February 1994
- 3d Air Support Group: 15 June 1992 – 1 February 1994
- 355th Operations Group: 1 May 1992 – September 2026
- 563d Rescue Group: 1 October 2018 – present

Squadrons

- 11th Tactical Drone Squadron: 1 July 1971 – 1 July 1976
- 35th Tactical Fighter Squadron: attached 8-c. 9 November 1965
- 40th Tactical Fighter Squadron: 1 October 1971 – 1 June 1972
- 41st Tactical Reconnaissance Squadron (later, 41st Tactical Electronic Warfare): attached 8 November 1965 – 18 September 1966 and 8–14 August 1967, assigned 15 August 1967 – 31 October 1969
- 42d Tactical Electronic Warfare Squadron (later 42d Airborne Command and Control Squadron): 1 January 1968 – 15 October 1970 (detached c. 23 September – 15 October 1970), 1 July 1994 – 30 September 2002
- 44th Tactical Fighter Squadron: 15 October 1969 – 10 December 1970
- 333d Tactical Fighter Squadron (later 333d Tactical Fighter Training Squadron: 4 December 1965 – 10 December 1970; 31 July 1971 – 15 February 1991
- 334th Tactical Fighter Squadron: attached 8 November 1965 – 5 February 1966
- 335th Tactical Fighter Squadron: attached 8 November – 6 December 1965
- 354th Fighter Squadron (later 354th Fighter-Interceptor Squadron, 354th Tactical Fighter Squadron, 354th Tactical Fighter Training Squadron): 12 November 1942 – 20 November 1946; 18 August 1955 – 8 January 1958; 8 July 1962 – 8 November 1965 (detached 24 January – 21 February 1964, 2 May-c. 20 September 1964, 3 March – 12 June 1965); 27 November 1965 – 10 December 1970; 1 July 1971 – 30 April 1982 (detached 12 January – 5 July 1973 and 22 January – 9 February 1979)
- 357th Fighter (later, 357th Tactical Fighter; 357th Tactical Fighter Training) Squadron: 12 November 1942 – 20 November 1946; 8 July 1962 – 8 November 1965 (detached 9 August – 12 December 1964, 12 June – 8 November 1965); 29 January 1966 – 10 December 1970; 1 July 1971 – 1 May 1992
- 358th Fighter (later, 56th Reconnaissance, Weather Scouting; 358th Tactical Fighter; 358 Tactical Fighter Training) Squadron: 12 November 1942 – 20 November 1946; 1 June 1972 – 1 May 1992 (detached 28 December 1973 – 15 May 1974), Inactivated in February 2014
- 421st Tactical Fighter Squadron: 8 July 1962 – 8 November 1965 (detached 15 September – 23 November 1964 and 7 April – 20 August 1965)
- 469th Fighter-Interceptor Squadron (later, 469th Tactical Fighter Squadron): 18 August 1955 – 8 January 1958; 8 July 1962 – 8 November 1965 (detached 30 November 1964 – 13 March 1965)
- 562d Tactical Fighter Squadron: attached 8 November-c. 4 December 1965
- 4455th Combat Crew Training: attached 1–8 October 1971
- 6460th Tactical Reconnaissance (later, 6460th Tactical Electronic Warfare): attached 8 June – 18 September 1966 and 8–14 August 1967, assigned 15 August 1967 – 1 January 1968
- Detachment 1, 428th Tactical Fighter Squadron: attached 17 March – 19 November 1968.

=== Stations ===
- Orlando Army Air Base, Florida, 12 November 1942
- Norfolk Airport, Virginia, 19 February 1943
- Philadelphia Municipal Airport, Pennsylvania, 4 March – 16 June 1943
- RAF Steeple Morden (USAAF Station 122), England, 6 July 1943
- AAF Station Gablingen (R-77), Germany, c. 10 July 1945
- AAF Station Schweinfurt (R-25), Germany, 15 April 1946
- Mitchel Field, New York, 1 August – 20 November 1946
- McGhee Tyson Air Force Base, Tennessee, 20 June 1955 – 8 January 1958
- George Air Force Base, California, 8 July 1962
- McConnell Air Force Base, Kansas, 21 July 1964 – October 1965
- Takhli Royal Thai Air Force Base, Thailand, 8 November 1965 – 10 December 1970
- Davis–Monthan Air Force Base, Arizona, 1 July 1971 – present

=== Aircraft operated ===
- Republic P-47 Thunderbolt (1942–1944)
- North American P-51 Mustang (1944–1946)
- North American F-86 Sabre (1955–1957)
- Republic F-105 Thunderchief (1962–1970)
- Douglas EB-66 Destroyer (1966–1970)
- Douglas RB-66 Destroyer (1965–1966)
- General Dynamics F-111 Aardvark (1968)
- McDonnell F-4 Phantom II (1971)
- LTV A-7 Corsair II (1971–1979)
- Lockheed DC-130 Hercules (1971–1976)
- Ryan AQM-34 Firebee (1974–1975)
- Ryan BGM-34 Firebee(1974–1975)
- Sikorsky CH-3 (1972–1976)
- Lockheed RC-130 Hercules (1975–1976)
- Fairchild Republic A-10 Thunderbolt II (1976 –2026)
- Lockheed EC-130E Airborne Command Post (1994–2002)
- Lockheed EC-130H Compass Call (1992 – 2026)
- Cessna O-2 Skymaster (1982–1992)
- North American Rockwell OV-10 Bronco (1982–1992)
- Cessna A-37 Dragonfly (1982–1990)
- Sikorsky HH-60 Pave Hawk (2003–present)

== In popular culture ==
- In the television series The West Wing, White House Chief of Staff Leo McGarry flew F-105s for the 355th Tactical Fighter Wing during the Vietnam War. In the fifth season episode An Khe, his mission over Southeast Asia in which he is shot down and evades capture, is depicted.
