= Cullerton =

Cullerton is a surname. Notable people with the surname include:

- John Cullerton (born 1948), American politician
- Mick Cullerton (born 1948), Scottish footballer
- Tom Cullerton (born 1969), American politician
- William J. Cullerton (1923–2013), American World War II flying ace, businessman, radio show host, and outdoorsman
