= 355th Operations Group =

US Air Force unit

355th Operations Group
- Active: 1992–present
- Country: United States
- Branch: United States Air Force
- Part of: Air Combat Command: Fifteenth Air Force; 355th Wing
- Garrison/HQ: Davis–Monthan Air Force Base, Arizona
- Decorations: Air Force Outstanding Unit Award

Insignia
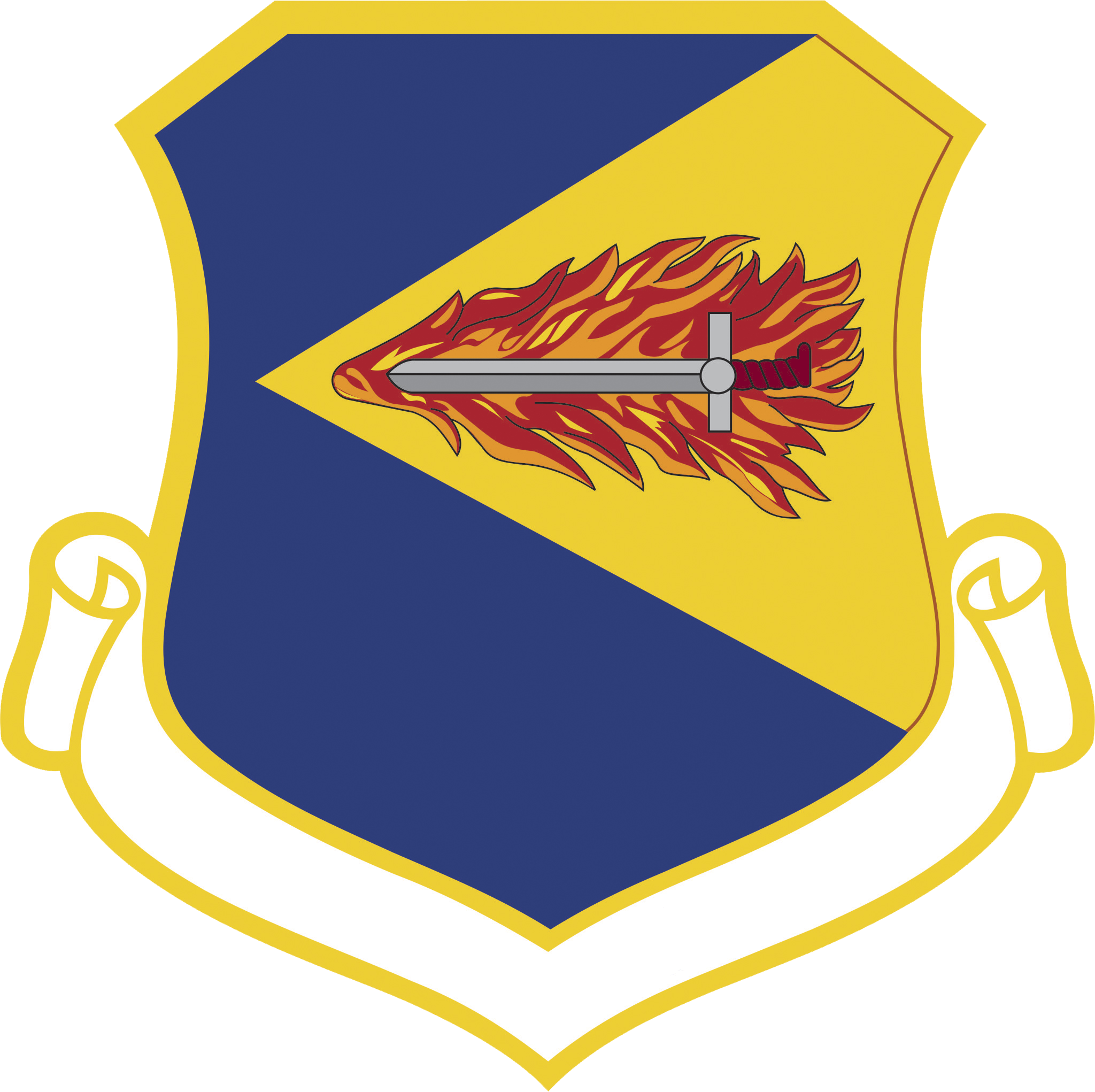
- 355th Operations Group emblem (Note: The group uses the emblem of the 355th Wing with the group designation on the scroll.)

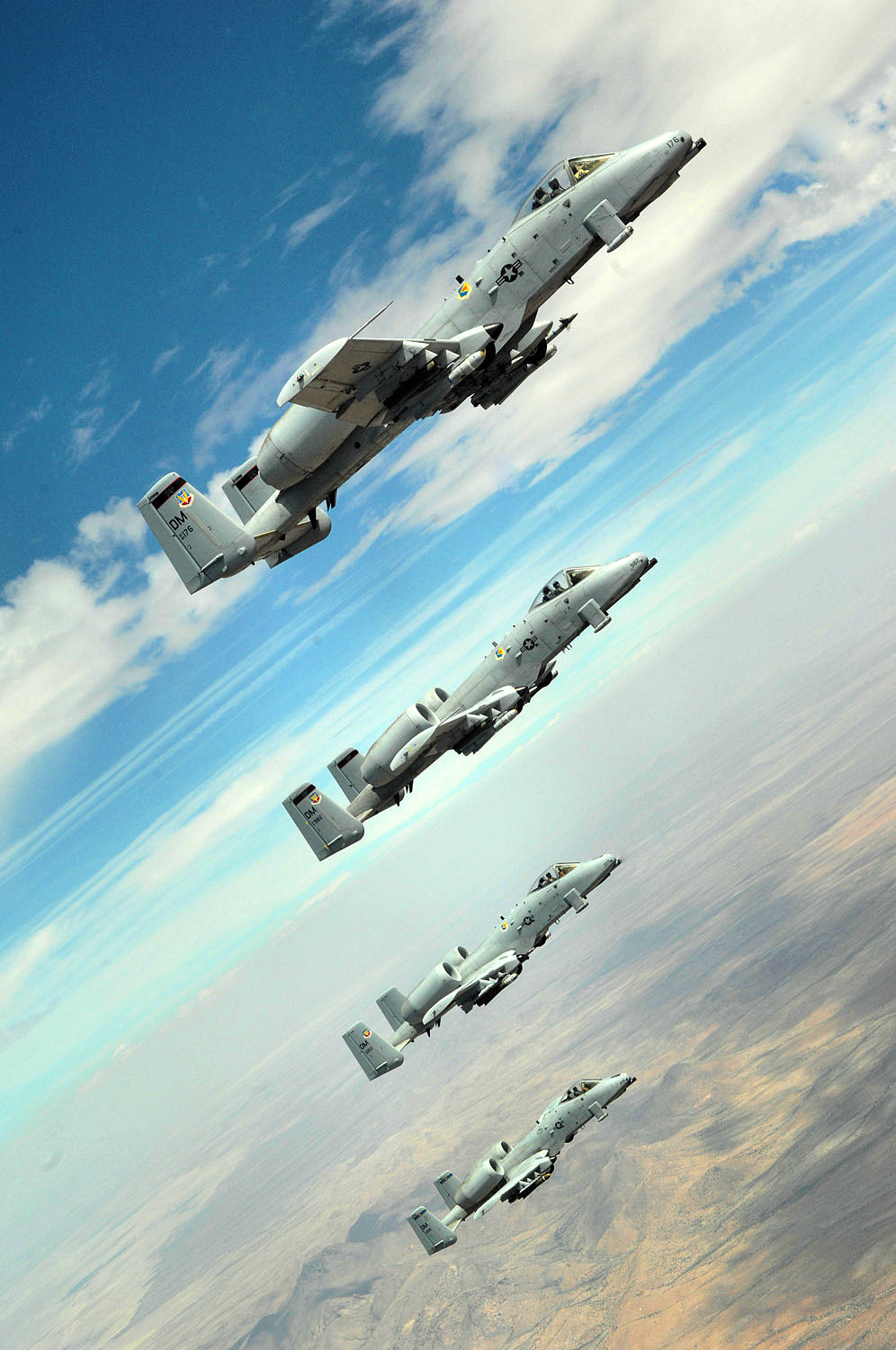
355th Operations Group A-10 Thunderbolt IIs

The 355th Operations Group (355 OG) was a United States Air Force unit, assigned to the 355th Wing. It was stationed at Davis–Monthan Air Force Base, Arizona. It was deactivated in September 2026.

== Units ==
The 355th Operations Group consisted of five squadrons and over 450 personnel employing 75 A/OA-10 aircraft and an AN/TPS-75 radar system. It provided war-fighters with forces for close air support (CAS), air interdiction (AI), forward air control (FAC), combat search and rescue (CSAR), ground-based tactical air control, and airbase operations. It also conducted all formal course directed aircraft initial qualification/requalification training.

- 354th Fighter Squadron

The 'Bulldogs' of the 354th FS maintaied and employed 18 A-10 and 6 OA-10 combat ready aircraft to conduct Close Air Support, Air Interdiction, Forward Air Control -- Airborne, and Combat Search and Rescue missions for theater commanders worldwide.

- 355th Operations Support Squadron
- 355th Training Squadron
- 357th Fighter Squadron

Trained pilots in the A-10 and OA-10 Thunderbolt II. The 'Dragons' of the 357th FS conducted all formal courses related to directed aircraft transition, day and night weapons and tactics employment, day and night air refueling and dissimilar air combat maneuvers. The squadron trained pilots to plan, coordinate, execute, and control day and night close air support, air interdiction and battlefield surveillance and reconnaissance. The squadron prepareed pilots for combat mission ready upgrade.

== History ==
Beginning in May 1992, the 355th Operations Group took over control of flying units for 355th Wing. It provided war-fighters with forces for close air support, air interdiction, forward air control, ground-based tactical air control, and airbase operations. From 1992 to 2002, the group trained and provided electronic combat capabilities and airborne command and control.

For a brief period from Mar-Oct 2003 until the squadrons realigned under the 563d Rescue Group, it maintained a combat search and rescue capability. It also conducted all formal course directed aircraft initial qualification/requalification training for the A-10. In Oct 2003 and again in Nov 2005, the group deployed A-10s in support of combat operations in Afghanistan and Iraq.

Until 2011, the wing maintained the West Coast A-10 Demonstration Team. After the 2011 season it was discontinued, due to Federal sequestration constraints. It had consisted of 12 members and was assigned to the 355th Operations Group. The team's primary mission is to encourage retention and recruitment by showcasing the A-10 Thunderbolt II. It performed at more than 30 air shows annually before 15 million spectators nationwide, and provided insight about Air Combat Command and the United States Air Force.

=== Lineage ===
- Established as 355th Operations Group, and activated, on 1 May 1992.

=== Assignments ===
- 355th Wing, 1 May 1992 – September 2026

=== Components ===
- 41st Electronic Combat Squadron: 1 May 1992 – 1 October 2002
- 42nd Airborne Command and Control Squadron: 1 July 1994 – 30 Sep 2002
- 43rd Electronic Combat Squadron: 1 May 1992 – 1 October 2002
- 55th Rescue Squadron: 14 March – 1 October 2003
- 79th Rescue Squadron: 14 March – 1 October 2003
- 333rd Fighter Squadron: 1 May 1992 – 1 October 1994
- 354th Fighter Squadron: 1 May 1992 – c. 20 September 2024
- 355th Operations Support Squadron: 1 May 1992 – September 2026
- 355th Training Squadron: 31 July 1996 – April 2026
- 357th Fighter Squadron: 1 May 1992 – September 2026
- 358th Fighter Squadron: 1 May 1992 – 21 February 2014
- 607th Air Control Squadron: 1 July 1993 – 1 May 2008

=== Stations ===
- Davis–Monthan Air Force Base, Arizona, 1 May 1992 – Sep 2026

=== Aircraft ===
- A-10 (1992–2026)
- EC-130 (1992–2002)
- HH-60 (2003)
