= 333rd Fighter Squadron =

333rd Fighter Squadron

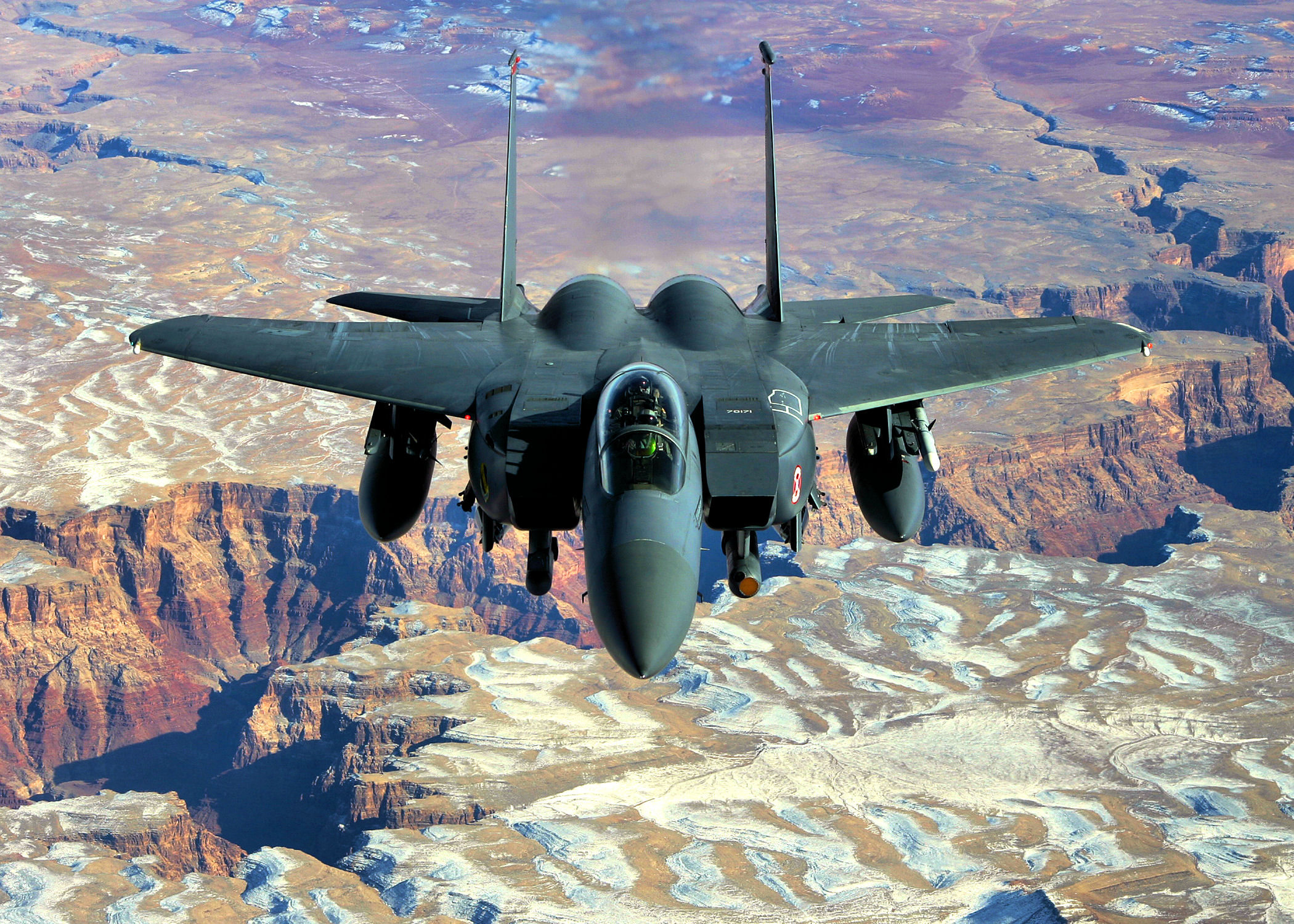
- 333rd Fighter Squadron F-15E Strike Eagle over the Grand Canyon
- Active: 1957–1991; 1991–present
- Country: United States
- Branch: United States Air Force
- Role: Fighter Training
- Part of: Air Combat Command
- Garrison/HQ: Seymour Johnson Air Force Base
- Nicknames: Lancers, Jousters
- Engagements: Vietnam War
- Decorations: Presidential Unit Citation; Air Force Outstanding Unit Award with Combat ''V'' Device; Air Force Outstanding Unit Award; Republic of Vietnam Gallantry Cross with Palm

Commanders
- Current commander: Lt Col Brian "BUD" Leitzke

Insignia
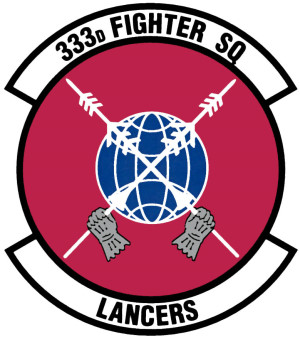
- 333rd Fighter Squadron emblem (approved 13 June 1958)

The 333rd Fighter Squadron is part of the 4th Operations Group, 4th Fighter Wing at Seymour Johnson Air Force Base, North Carolina. It operates McDonnell Douglas F-15E Strike Eagle aircraft conducting advanced fighter training.

== History ==
Activated in 1957 at Seymour Johnson Air Force Base, North Carolina as a fourth North American F-100 Super Sabre squadron with the 4th Fighter-Day Wing, taking over personnel and equipment from the 448th Fighter-Day Squadron. Performed routine training exercises,. The F-100s remained with the 333rd until 1960 when it was upgraded to the Republic F-105B Thunderchief. During the Cuban Missile Crisis, the squadron was deployed to McCoy Air Force Base, Florida, ready to react at a moments notice for possible combat over Cuba.

In the spring of 1964, the 333rd began the transition from F-105Bs to F-105D/Fs.

=== Vietnam War ===
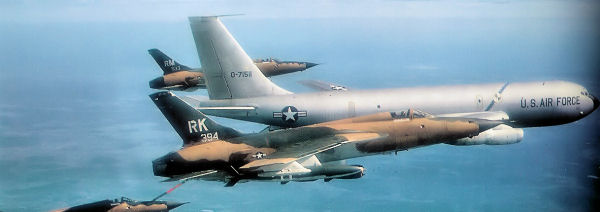
F-105s from the 354th and 333d TFS refueling with a KC-135 from Takhli Air Base

The squadron was deployed to Thailand in late 1965 to Korat Royal Thai Air Force Base for combat operations over Southeast Asia. However, the 333d then transferred to Takhli Royal Thai Air Force Base to relieve the 335th Tactical Fighter Squadron. On 3 December 1965, the 333d deployment was changed from temporary to a permanent change of station, and the squadron was reassigned to the 355th Tactical Fighter Wing at Takhli. Remained in combat operations over Southeast Asia from Thailand until October 1970 when was withdrawn from Thailand as part of the United States' phasedown of operations in the Vietnam War. Began to carry tail code "RK" in March 1968, carried red colors on tail.

=== Ground Support ===
Assigned non-operationally to McConnell Air Force Base, Kansas, then also to Luke Air Force Base, Arizona as a non-operational squadron. Was Moved to Davis-Monthan Air Force Base in July 1971, becoming an operational LTV A-7D Corsair II squadron under Tactical Air Command's Twelfth Air Force, 355th Tactical Fighter Wing.

Aircraft carried tail code "DM", with red tail stripe. Took part in routine deployments and training operations with the A-7D until 1976, being upgraded to the new Fairchild Republic A-10A Thunderbolt II, becoming the first tactical unit to fly the A-10A. Initially retained red tail stripe, later replaced by red and white checkered fin caps. Trained and deployed with the 355th Wing until inactivated in February 1991 as part of the drawdown of the Air Force after the Cold War ended. Was reactivated in November 1991 as the 333rd Fighter Squadron at Davis-Monthan, replacing the 22nd Tactical Air Support Training Squadron as an OA-10 forward air controller training squadron. Replaced by the 354th Fighter Squadron in October 1994.

=== F-15E Strike Eagle ===
Returned to Seymour Johnson Air Force Base as a McDonnell Douglas F-15E Strike Eagle training Squadron, 1 October 1994 in conjunction with the transfer of the F-15E formal training unit at Luke Air Force Base, Arizona.

== Lineage ==
- Constituted as the 333rd Fighter-Day Squadron on 13 November 1957

Activated on 8 December 1957
Redesignated: 333rd Tactical Fighter Squadron on 1 July 1958
Redesignated: 333rd Tactical Fighter Training Squadron on 22 March 1971
Inactivated on 15 February 1991

- Redesignated 333rd Fighter Squadron and activated on 1 November 1991

=== Assignments ===
- 4th Fighter-Day Wing (later 4 Tactical Fighter Wing), 8 December 1957 (attached to 4485th Composite Wing 10 March 1964 – c. 15 March 1965)
- 355th Tactical Fighter Wing, 8 December 1965
- 23rd Tactical Fighter Wing, 15 October 1970
- 58th Tactical Fighter Training Wing, 22 March 1971
- 355th Tactical Fighter Wing (later, 355 Tactical Training Wing), 31 July 1971 – 15 February 1991
- 602nd Air Control Wing, 1 November 1991
- 355th Operations Group, 1 May 1992
- 4th Operations Group, 1 October 1994 – present

=== Stations ===
- Seymour Johnson Air Force Base, North Carolina, 8 December 1957 – 4 December 1965 (deployed to Eglin Air Force Base, Florida, 10 March 1964 – c. 15 Mar 1965)
- Takhli Royal Thai Air Force Base, Thailand, 8 December 1965
- McConnell Air Force Base, Kansas, 15 October 1970
- Luke Air Force Base, Arizona, 22 March 1971
- Davis-Monthan Air Force Base, Arisona, c. 31 July 1971 – 15 February 1991
- Davis-Monthan Air Force Base, Arizona, 1 November 1991
- Seymour Johnson Air Force Base, North Carolina, 1 Oct 1994 – present

=== Aircraft ===
- North American F-100 Super Sabre (1957–1960)
- Republic F-105 Thunderchief (1960–1970)
- LTV A-7 Corsair II (1971–1976)
- Fairchild Republic A-10 Thunderbolt II (1976–1991, 1991–1994)
- F-15E Strike Eagle (1994 – present)
