= 358th Fighter Squadron =

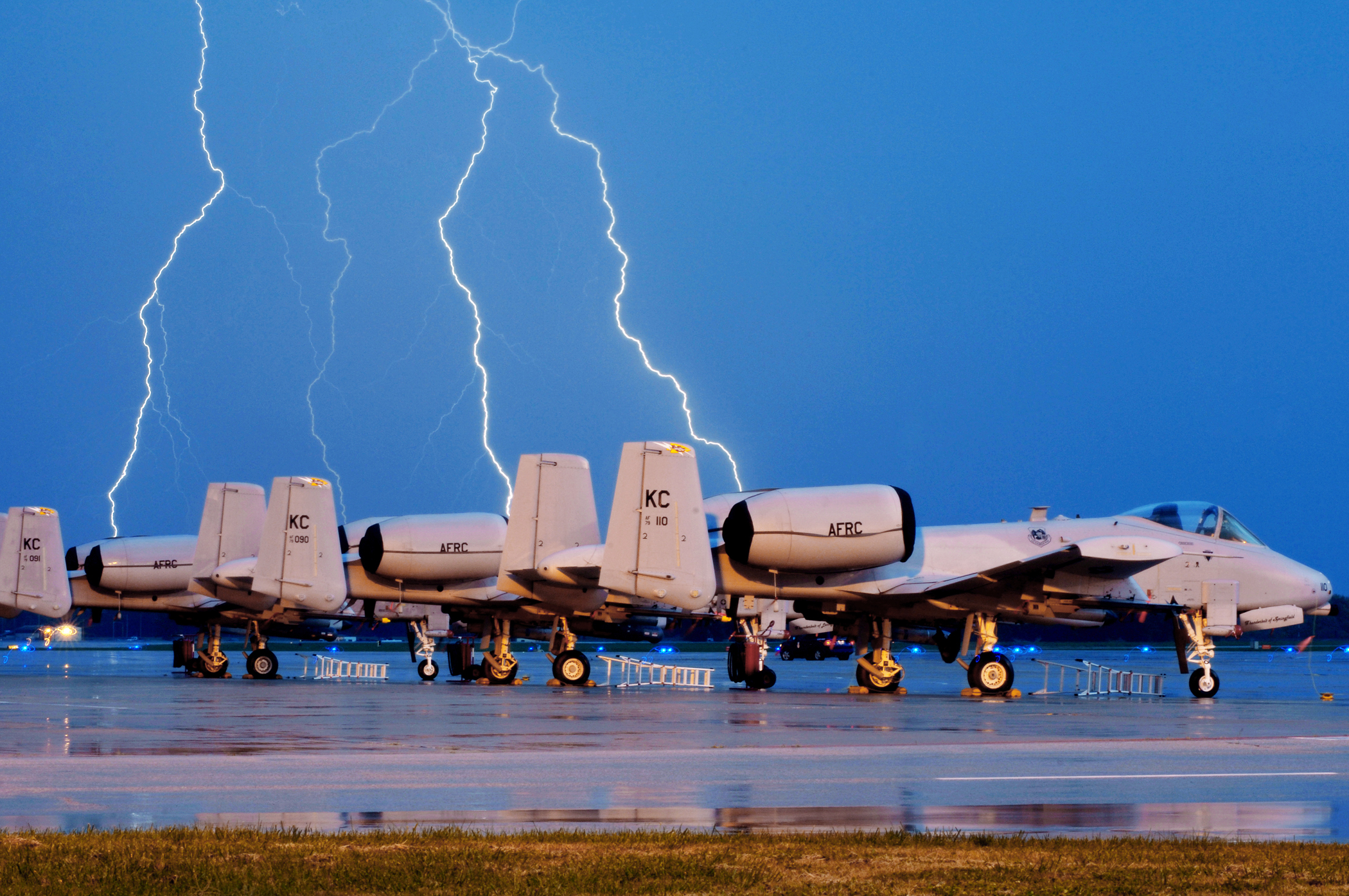
- A-10 Thunderbolt IIs at Whiteman AFB
- Active: 1942–1946; 1951–1972; 1972–2014; 2015–present
- Country: United States
- Branch: United States Air Force
- Role: Fighter
- Part of: Air Combat Command
- Garrison/HQ: Whiteman Air Force Base
- Nickname: Lobos
- Motto: When Deterrence fails...ATTACK!!!)
- Engagements: European Theater of Operations; Korean War
- Decorations: Distinguished Unit Citation; Air Force Outstanding Unit Award

Commanders
- Notable commanders: William J. Hovde

Insignia
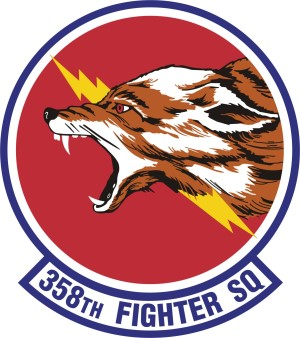
- 358th Fighter Squadron emblem (Note: Approved 14 November 1972. Description; On a Red disc fimbriated White and bordered Blue issuing from sinister a wolf's head, Brown, garnished White and Red and detailed Black, surmounting a Yellow lightning bolt extending from upper left to lower right.)

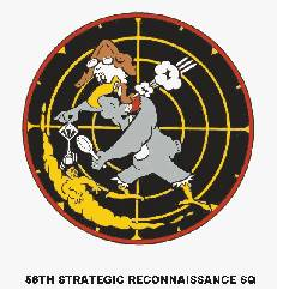
- 56th Strategic Reconnaissance Squadron emblem (Note: Approved 26 September 1952. Description: On a disc black, edged red, three concentric circular lines, bisected by one vertical and one horizontal cross hair, representative of the face of a radar scope yellow, superimposed over-all a caricatured buzzard gray, "with a Sherlock Homes manner," face and vest front white, beak and feet yellow, outline and details black, wearing an aviator's helmet brown; the buzzard smoking a Calabash pipe brown, from which two puffs of smoke ae emitting, and holding in his right hand a dropsonde instrument; in his left hand a magnifying glass white, through which he examines a caricatured representation of a squall-line yellow, in the lower right (dexter) of the disc.)

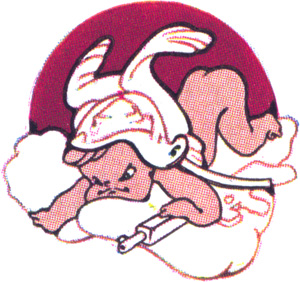
- 358th Fighter Squadron emblem (Note: Approved 7 July 1943.)

The 358th Fighter Squadron is part of the 495th Fighter Group at Whiteman Air Force Base, Missouri. The squadron was reactivated there in 2015. The squadron was formerly part of the 355th Operations Group at Davis–Monthan Air Force Base, Arizona, operating the Fairchild Republic A-10 Thunderbolt II aircraft conducting close air support missions, until its 2014 inactivation.

== Mission ==
To train and provide the United States of America with combat ready lethal and resilient airmen in support of the nation's deterrence.

== History ==
=== World War II ===
The squadron was activated on 12 November 1942 as a Republic P-47D Thunderbolt Fighter Squadron of the 355th Fighter Group. It trained under First Air Force initially at Orlando Army Air Base, Florida, then moving for second and third stage training to Norfolk Airport in Virginia from 17 February 1943 and last at Philadelphia Airport in Pennsylvania from 4 March. While in training, it served in an air defense role over large cities and military installations in the eastern United States.

The squadron deployed to the European Theater of Operations (ETO) in July 1943, where it became part of VIII Fighter Command in England. The squadron's primary mission was to escort Boeing B-17 Flying Fortress and Consolidated B-24 Liberator heavy bombers to and on the return flights over Occupied Europe and Nazi Germany. It engaged in numerous air battles on an almost daily basis with Luftwaffe day interceptor aircraft while escorting the heavy bombers. The squadron upgraded to long-range North American P-51D Mustangs in March 1944, with the USAAF gaining air superiority with the P-51 and by 1945, almost complete air supremacy over the skies of Nazi Germany. In addition, the squadron conducted fighter sweeps over enemy airfields, destroying Luftwaffe aircraft on the ground as well as attacking enemy targets of opportunity over Germany and Occupied Europe. The squadron remained in combat until the German Capitulation in May 1945, moving from England to various Occupation airfields in Germany as part of the United States Air Forces in Europe army of occupation in July. On 20 December the squadron became the 56th Reconnaissance Squadron, Weather Scouting. In April 1946 the squadron returned to the United States and inactivated on 20 November.

=== Weather reconnaissance ===
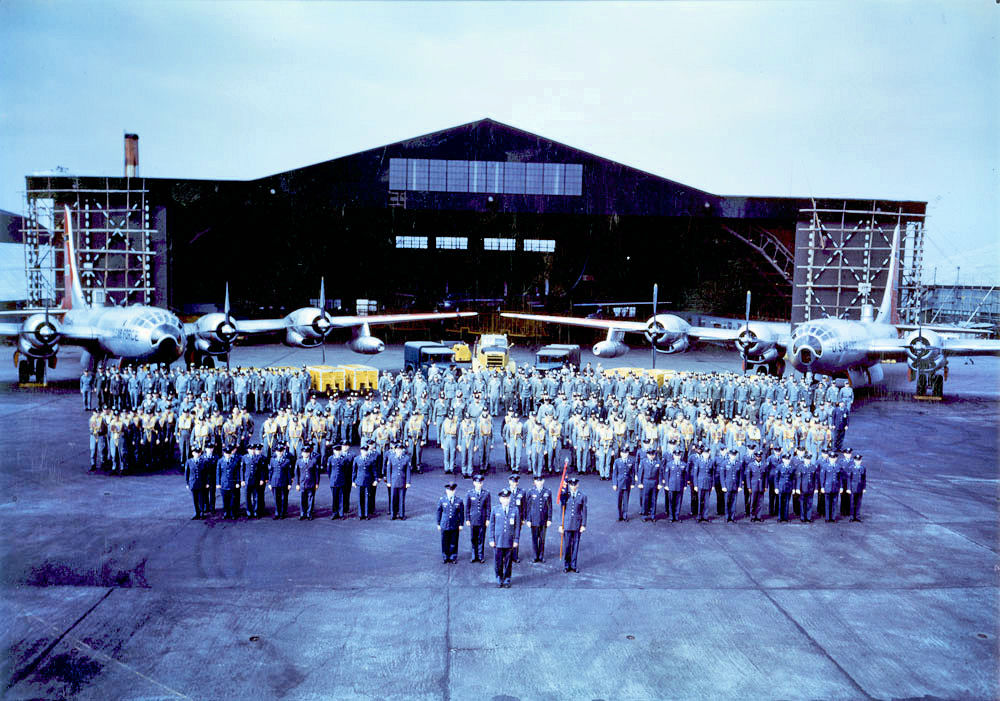
56th WRS at Yokota AB, Japan 1952

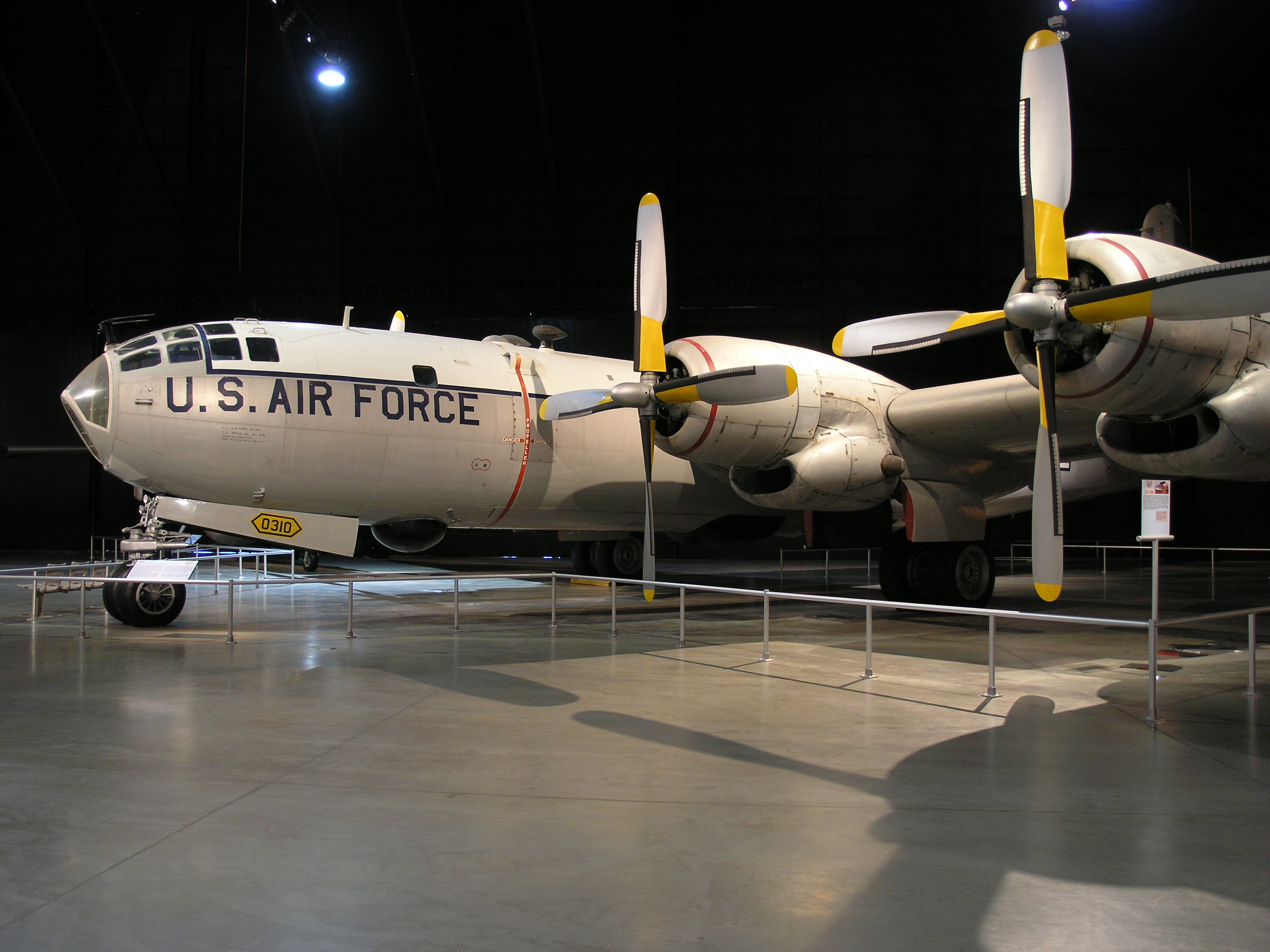
B-50D-115BO, AF Ser. No. 49–310, used for weather reconnaissance on display at the United States Air Force Museum

The squadron was reactivated in 1951 as the 56th Strategic Reconnaissance Squadron in Japan during the Korean War. It replaced the 512th Reconnaissance Squadron, assuming its personnel and aircraft. The squadron flew Boeing WB-29 Superfortress weather reconnaissance aircraft over North Korea in highly hazardous, almost daily strategic weather reconnaissance missions over the combat zone. Through the end of the conflict, the squadron conducted shipping surveillance and flew two reconnaissance tracks to observe and report weather conditions in the area east of the Asian land mass, between Formosa and Soviet Kamchatka Peninsula. It remained in Japan after the 1953 armistice and continued weather flights, which were sometimes ruses for strategic reconnaissance missions along the Northeast Asia coastline of the Soviet Union and along the border of the People's Republic of China. The squadron operated the Boeing WB-50 Superfortress in 1956, continuing operations from Japan, and later Guam with the RB-50s until 1962.

Beginning in 1963, the squadron was re-equipped with new high-altitude reconnaissance Martin RB-57F Canberra aircraft modified for high altitude, long range intelligence gathering, assigned to the meteorological role. Part of their duties involved high-altitude atmospheric sampling and radiation detection work in support of nuclear test monitoring. Over the next decade the RB-57Fs were flown on a worldwide basis at very high altitudes at high speeds. Stress cracks began appearing in the wing spars and ribs of the RB-57Fs after a few years of service. Some were sent to General Dynamics for repairs. By 1971 the aircraft were basically worn out and they were flown to Davis–Monthan for storage. The squadron was then inactivated in early 1972.

=== Return to fighter operations ===
The squadron returned to the United States and was re-united with its World War II parent organization, and designation; its mission being a Tactical Air Command tactical fighter squadron. The 358th TFS was reactivated on 13 November 1972 under the command of Colonel Jim Ryan whose life is detailed in the authorized biography Under the Wing of a Patriot authored by the Publisher of The Sedalia Democrat, Shane Allen. The squadron was given the name the Lobos, after Col. Ryan's German shepherd, and re-equipped with new LTV A-7D Corsair II ground attack aircraft. After training and becoming operationally ready, the squadron was deployed to Thailand after the end of United States combat in Indochina. Its mission was the defense of Thai airspace, and to intervene in Indochina if the terms of the 1973 Paris Peace Treaty were broken. The squadron remained in Thailand until early 1974 when it returned to the United States. The squadron engaged in TAC training, exercises and deployments, being upgraded to the Fairchild Republic A-10 Thunderbolt II aircraft in 1979. The squadron flew the A-10 for the next 30 years as part of Tactical Air Command and later Air Combat Command, engaging in combat with the aircraft as part of the global war on terrorism beginning in 2001.

The 358th was inactivated in a ceremony held at Davis–Monthan AFB on Friday, 21 February 2014 as part of the USAF's Total Force Integration policy. The squadron facilities and aircraft were assumed by the Air Force Reserve's 47th Fighter Squadron, which had inactivated in late 2013 at Barksdale Air Force Base, Louisiana, and relocated to Davis–Monthan in order to be reactivated as an AFRC A-10 Formal Training Unit once again, beginning in March 2014.

The squadron was reactivated on 18 October 2015 as part of the 495th Fighter Group (Active Associate) at Whiteman Air Force Base. The squadron is attached to the 442nd Fighter Wing. Lieutenant Colonel Michael Dumas took command of the squadron on 22 July 2022.

== Lineage ==
- Constituted as the 358th Fighter Squadron and activated on 12 November 1942

Redesignated: 358th Fighter Squadron, Single Engine on 20 August 1943
Redesignated: 56th Reconnaissance Squadron, Weather Scouting on 3 December 1945
Inactivated on 20 November 1946

- Redesignated 56th Strategic Reconnaissance Squadron, Medium, Weather on 22 January 1951

Activated on 21 February 1951
Redesignated 56th Weather Reconnaissance Squadron on 15 February 1954
Inactivated on 15 January 1972

- Redesignated 358th Tactical Fighter Squadron on 18 May 1972

Activated on 1 June 1972
Redesignated: 358th Tactical Fighter Training Squadron on 1 January 1976
Redesignated: 358th Fighter Squadron on 1 November 1991
Inactivated on 21 February 2014
Activated on 18 October 2015

=== Assignments ===
- 355th Fighter Group, 12 November 1942 – 20 November 1946 (attached to Orlando Fighter Wing until 17 February 1943, Norfolk Fighter Wing, until 4 March 1943, Philadelphia Fighter Wing, until 16 June 1943
- 2143d Air Weather Wing, 21 February 1951
- 1st Weather Wing, 8 February 1954
- 9th Weather Group (later 9th Weather Reconnaissance Group), 1 February 1960
- 9th Weather Reconnaissance Wing, 1 July 1965 – 15 January 1972
- 355th Tactical Fighter Wing (later 355th Tactical Training Wing, 355th Fighter Wing), 1 June 1972 (attached to 354th Tactical Fighter Wing (Deployed), 28 December 1973 – 15 May 1974
- 355th Operations Group, 1 May 1992 – 21 February 2014
- 495th Fighter Group (Active Associate), 18 October 2015 – present

=== Bases stationed ===
- Orlando Army Air Base, Florida, 12 November 1942
- Norfolk Airport, Virginia, 17 February 1943
- Philadelphia Airport, Pennsylvania, 4 March–16 June 1943
- RAF Steeple Morden, England, 8 July 1943
- AAF Station Gablingen, Germany, 16 July 1945
- AAF Station Schweinfurt, Germany, April 1946
- Mitchel Field, New York, 1 August–20 November 1946
- Misawa Air Base, Japan, 21 February 1951
- Yokota Air Base, Japan, 14 September 1951 – 15 January 1972

Detachment operated from Andersen Air Force Base, Guam, 11 March 1960 – 18 April 1962
Deployed at Korat Royal Thai Air Force Base, Thailand, 28 December 1973 – 15 May 1974

- Davis–Monthan Air Force Base, Arizona, 1 June 1972 – 21 February 2014
- Whiteman Air Force Base, Missouri, 18 October 2015 – present

=== Aircraft operated ===
- Republic P-47 Thunderbolt (1943–1944)
- North American P-51 Mustang (1944–1945)
- Boeing WB-29 Superfortress (1951–1957)
- Boeing WB-50 Superfortress (1956–1965)
- Martin RB-57F Canberra (1962–1964, 1966–1972)
- C-130 Hercules (1962–1964)
- WB-47 Stratojet (1963–1966)
- WC-135 Constant Phoenix (1964–1972)
- LTV A-7 Corsair II (1972–1979)
- Fairchild Republic A-10 Thunderbolt II (1979 – 2014, 2015 – present)

=== Operations ===
- World War II
- Korean War

== Bibliography ==
- Endicott, Judy G. (1998). Active Air Force Wings as of 1 October 1995 and USAF Active Flying, Space, and Missile Squadrons as of 1 October 1995 (PDF). Air Force History and Museums Program. Washington, DC: Office of Air Force History. ASIN B000113MB2.
- Maurer, Maurer, ed. (1983) [1961]. Air Force Combat Units of World War II (PDF) (reprint ed.). Washington, DC: Office of Air Force History. ISBN 0-912799-02-1. LCCN 61060979. Archived from the original (PDF) on 20 December 2016.
- Maurer, Maurer, ed. (1982) [1969]. Combat Squadrons of the Air Force, World War II (PDF) (reprint ed.). Washington, DC: Office of Air Force History. ISBN 0-405-12194-6. LCCN 70605402. OCLC 72556. Archived from the original (PDF) on 20 December 2016.
- Ravenstein, Charles A. (1984). Air Force Combat Wings, Lineage & Honors Histories 1947–1977. Washington, DC: Office of Air Force History. ISBN 0-912799-12-9.
- Watkins, Robert (2008). Battle Colors: Insignia and Markings of the Eighth Air Force in World War II. Vol. II (VIII) Fighter Command. Atglen, PA: Shiffer Publishing Ltd. ISBN 978-0-7643-2535-9.
