= William J. Cullerton =

American flying ace (1923–2013)

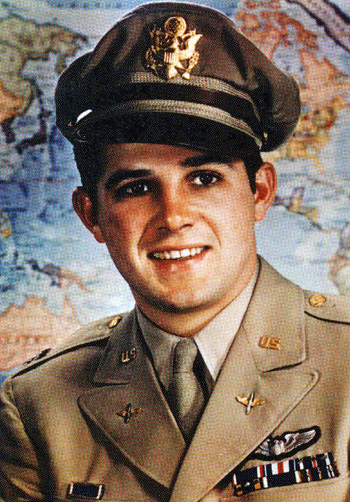
- Captain William J. Cullerton
- Born: June 2, 1923; Chicago, Illinois, U.S.
- Died: January 12, 2013 (aged 89); Downers Grove, Illinois, U.S.
- Burial place: Bronswood Cemetery, Oak Brook, Illinois
- Relatives: Elaine Cullerton (wife)
- Military career
- Allegiance: United States
- Branch: United States Army Air Forces
- Service years: 1942–1945
- Rank: Captain
- Nickname: Bill
- Units: 357th Fighter Squadron; 355th Fighter Group
- Conflicts: World War II
- Awards: Distinguished Service Cross; Silver Star; Distinguished Flying Cross (4); Purple Heart; Air Medal (8)
- Other work: Host of Great Outdoors Show on WGN-Radio (1979–99)

William J. "Bill" Cullerton Sr. (June 2, 1923 – January 12, 2013) was an American World War II flying ace, entrepreneur, radio show host, and outdoorsman. Cullerton destroyed twenty-one Axis planes during the war, including sixteen destroyed in low-altitude attacks on the ground, ranking him as the second highest strafing ace in the 355th Fighter Group. He was the last surviving ace of the 355th Fighter Group ("Dragon Squadron"), which flew missions out of Steeple Morden, England, during World War II.

== Early life ==
Cullerton was born in Chicago and raised in Oak Park, Illinois, graduated from Fenwick High School. His grandfather, Bill Jamison, owned a firm which still manufactures collectible fishing lures today. Cullerton worked for his grandfather as a teenager. He was a relative of several Chicago area political figures, including Edward "Foxy" Cullerton (first elected to the Chicago City Council in 1871); his cousin, former President of the Illinois Senate John Cullerton; and Cook County Assessor P.J. "Parky" Cullerton.

Cullerton attended college for a short time, but left soon after to enlist during World War II.

== World War II ==
Cullerton enlisted in the United States Army Air Forces during World War II. He flew P-51B and P-51D Mustang fighters as part of the Dragon Squadron, headquartered at the RAF Steeple Morden airfield near Steeple Morden, England.

Cullerton, a flying ace, destroyed twenty-one Luftwaffe planes during the war. He shot down five German fighters during aerial dogfights. Cullerton also destroyed sixteen planes on the ground in strafing attacks, ranking him as the second highest strafing ace in the 355th Fighter Group.

Cullerton was covered extensively by Chicago newspapers during World War II. Headlines featuring Cullerton included "Chicago Pilot Bags Eight Nazi Planes in One Day's Fights," "Germans Find Chicago Ace Too Hot to Handle" and "Cullerton has 18 'Kills'."

=== Capture and torture ===
On April 8, 1945, Cullerton was shot down strafing the airfield at Ansbach, Germany near the end of the war, crashing on a hillside near German forces. Cullerton was found and shot in the stomach by a German stormtrooper using his own gun. Cullerton described the attack in an interview years later, "They had a short meeting, and the guy came back to me, holding my gun in his hand, and he said to me, 'For you, the 'war' is over' — and he shot me in the belly."

Cullerton was discovered wounded in a field by a German farmer, who mistakenly believed he was a German pilot, rather than an American. Cullerton was taken to a German hospital, where he was tortured by German forces." A Jewish doctor helped him escape the hospital, telling him to jump from a window into a heap of sheep manure. Cullerton did as he was instructed and managed to escape.

=== Rescue ===
American and Allied troops later discovered Cullerton wounded and hiding under a bridge near Feuchtwangen, Bavaria. The Allied forces were unsure if Cullerton was an American or a German impersonating an American pilot. To test Cullerton on his nationality, the Americans asked him, "Who is Ted Williams?" Cullerton correctly identified Williams as the "Splendid Splinter" of the Boston Red Sox, proving that he was an American before collapsing. Chicago area newspapers reported his rescue with headlines like "Capt. Cullerton's Return Hailed as Near Miracle."

Cullerton was awarded the Distinguished Service Cross, the Silver Star, the Distinguished Flying Cross plus three Oak Leaf Clusters, the Air Medal plus seven Oak Leaf Clusters and the Purple Heart.

Author John J. Kevil Jr. wrote a biography on Cullerton, The Last Dragon of Steeple Morden.

== Later life ==
Cullerton married Elaine Stephen after the war. He often called his wife "Steve" or "Miss Steve" in a reference to her original maiden name. A Chicago newspaper covered the wedding under the headline, "Chicago's Army Ace is Downed by Cupid's Dart." The couple raised their children in Elmhurst, Illinois, a Chicago suburb. He also rejoined his grandfather's fishing lure business following the war.

Cullerton founded the Cullerton Co., in the 1950s. The company represents manufacturers of outdoor and fishing products Bill Cullerton is considered to be an early pioneer of the fishing travel industry. He also supported the growth of outdoor shows.

Cullerton hosted a popular Chicago Saturday morning show radio show called "Great Outdoors" on WGN Radio for twenty years before his retirement in December 1999. Charlie Potter succeeded Cullerton as host of "Great Outdoors," which still airs on WGN as of 2026.

An outdoor enthusiast and conservationist, Cullerton advocated for environmental preservation in Illinois and surrounding states. Cullerton advocated for the restoration of the Midewin National Tallgrass Prairie, now a United States National Grassland near Wilmington, Illinois. He championed an effort to install an artificial reef off the coast of Chicago in Lake Michigan to improve the habitat available for native fish.

Cullerton was a founding member of the Illinois Conservation Foundation and was later named to its hall of fame. He was inducted into the Freshwater Fishing Hall of Fame in Hayward, Wisconsin.

On May 9, 2000, the Illinois Beach State Park and North Point Marina in Zion, Illinois, was dedicated as the William J. Cullerton Complex in recognition of his conservation efforts. The ceremony, which was attended by then-Governor George Ryan and Illinois First Lady Lura Lynn Ryan, included a flyover by two P-51 Mustang planes. The William J. Cullerton Complex includes the 4,160-acre Illinois State Park and the North Point Marina on Lake Michigan, which is capable of holding approximately 1,500 boats.

Cullerton died at Advocate Good Samaritan Hospital in Downers Grove, Illinois, on January 12, 2013, at the age of 89. He was survived by his wife, Elaine, three daughters and two sons. A longtime resident of Oak Brook, Illinois, Cullerton and his wife also owned a second home in Marco Island, Florida. He lived in Warrenville, Illinois, in 2000.

== Awards and decorations ==
Cullerton earned the following decorations:

USAAF Pilot Badge
Distinguished Service Cross
Silver Star
Distinguished Flying Cross with three bronze oak leaf clusters
Purple Heart
Air Medal with silver and two bronze oak leaf clusters
Prisoner of War Medal
American Campaign Medal
European-African-Middle Eastern Campaign Medal with three bronze campaign stars
World War II Victory Medal

French Croix de Guerre with Palm

Army Presidential Unit Citation
