= 79th Rescue Squadron =

US Air Force unit

79th Rescue Squadron

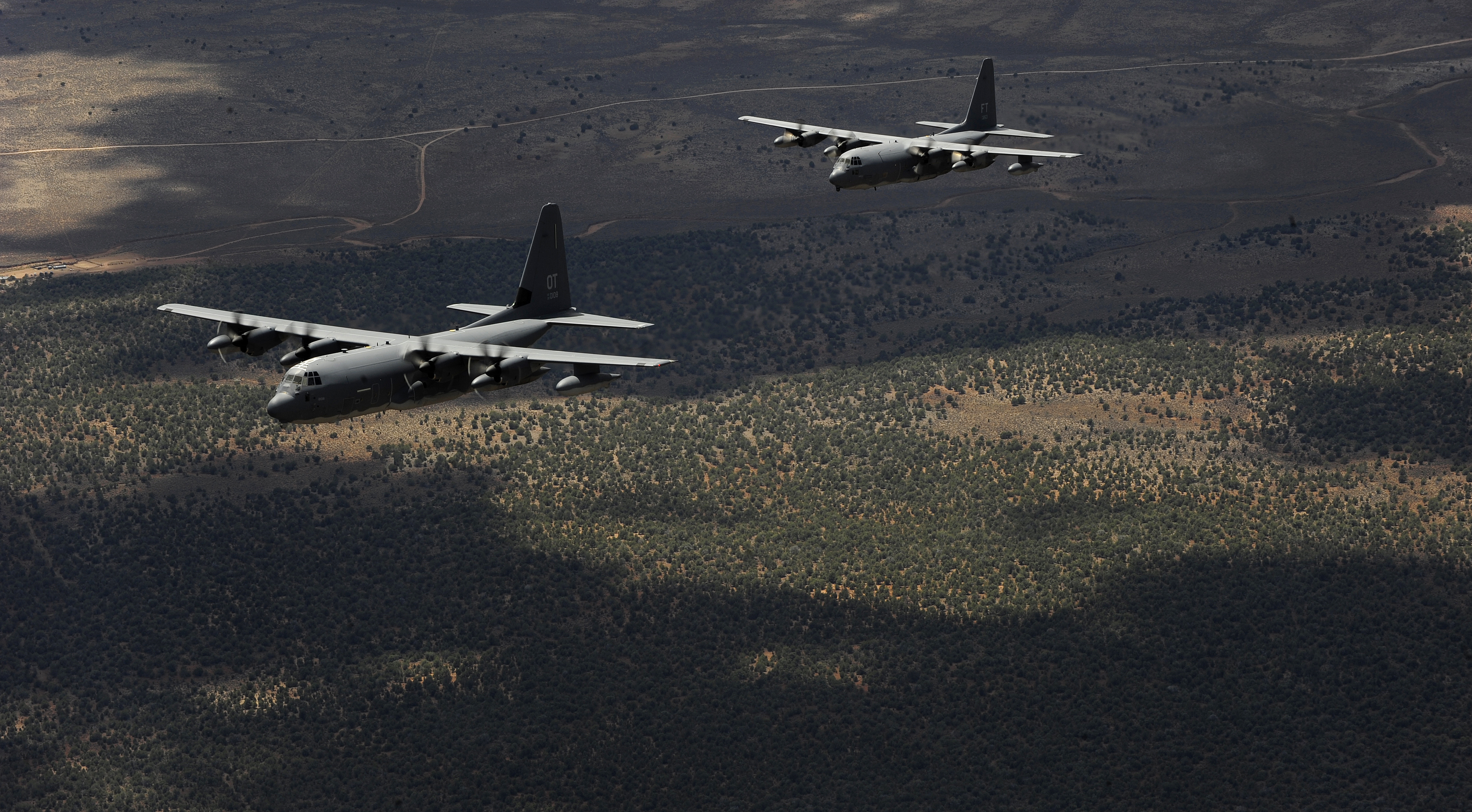
- 79th Rescue Squadron HC-130J and HC-130P near the Grand Canyon
- Active: 1952–1960; 1961–1972; 1993–1998; 2003–present
- Country: United States
- Branch: United States Air Force
- Role: Combat Search and Rescue
- Part of: Air Combat Command
- Garrison/HQ: Davis-Monthan Air Force Base
- Engagements: War in Afghanistan; Global war on terrorism
- Decorations: Navy Meritorious Unit Commendation; Air Force Meritorious Unit Award; Air Force Outstanding Unit Award

Insignia
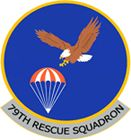
- 79th Rescue Squadron emblem (approved 23 July 1968)

The 79th Rescue Squadron is a United States Air Force combat search and rescue unit of the 563rd Rescue Group, 355th Wing, at Davis-Monthan Air Force Base, Arizona.

It operates the Lockheed HC-130J "Combat King II" variant of the C-130 "Hercules" and provides rapidly deployable combat search and rescue forces to theater commanders worldwide. It conducts helicopter air refueling, airdrop, and airland of pararescue personnel and/or equipment in support of combat personnel recovery. Its crews are capable of landings on short, unimproved, runways and low-level operations during day or night with night vision goggles.

== Mission ==
The 79th Rescue Squadron operates the HC-130J "Combat King II" and provides rapidly deployable combat personnel recovery forces to theater commanders worldwide. It conducts helicopter air-to-air refueling, airdrop and airland of pararescue personnel and/or equipment in support of combat personnel recovery. The 79th is capable of providing airborne mission commander and rescue mission commander duties for long periods of time due to our receiver aerial refueling capability, limiting mission length to crew stamina. Its crews are capable of landing on short, unimproved runways and conducting low-level operations during daytime missions, or night with the aid of night vision goggles.

== History ==
Constituted as 79 Air Rescue Squadron on 17 Oct 1952. Activated on 14 Nov 1952 at Andersen AFB, Guam operating SB-29 'Super Dumbo' (search and rescue version of the B-29 bomber). Discontinued, and inactivated, on 18 Sep 1960. Activated on 10 May 1961. Organized on 18 Jun 1961. Redesignated as 79 Aerospace Rescue and Recovery Squadron on 8 Jan 1966. Supported U.S. space recovery operations during the late 1960s. Inactivated on 30 Jun 1972. Redesignated as 79 Rescue Flight on 1 Apr 1993.

Activated on 1 May 1993 at Grand Forks AFB, ND and provided search, rescue, and recovery services in the area around Grand Forks AFB with UH-1 Iroquois'. Inactivated on 2 Jul 1998. Redesignated as 79 Rescue Squadron on 22 Jan 2003. Activated on 14 Mar 2003 at Davis-Monthan AFB, AZ with HC-130P and HC-130E. Assigned to the 563 Rescue Group on 1 October 2003. In October 2003 the 79th Rescue Squadron was re-aligned under the 563d Rescue Group and the 23d Wing as a geographically-separated unit out of Moody Air Force Base, Georgia. The squadron was realigned from the 23rd Wing to Davis-Monthan AFB's 355th Fighter Wing on 1 October 2018.

=== Recent Accomplishments ===
2011 Meritorious Unit Award (1 Jun 2011 – 31 May 2011); 2012 Meritorious Unit Award (1 Jun 2011 – 31 Jan 2012). In 2011, the 79th Rescue Squadron completed an eight-month Operation Enduring Freedom deployment, where it executed 1215 combat sorties, saving the lives of 334 allied, coalition, and Afghan military and civilian personnel. 2015 Meritorious Unit Award

==== 2005 Hurricane Katrina Rescue Missions ====
The 79th Rescue Squadron deployed to Moody Air Force Base in support of Joint Task Force Katrina . The 79th along with their sister squadron, the 71st Rescue Squadron located at Moody, flew search and rescue and refueling missions over the New Orleans area for several days after the hurricane destroyed much of the Gulf Coast. The crews from the two rescue squadrons were credited with over 4,300 saves.

==== 2006 Sudan mission ====
In 2006, personnel and aircraft from the squadron were the primary force provider to the 79th Expeditionary Rescue Squadron, located at Camp Lemonnier, Djibouti was sent to an airfield in Darfur, Sudan to retrieve equipment left behind by a US military liaison officer who had recently been evacuated from the area. On the ground at Al-Fashir Airfield, the aircraft was surrounded by 150 Sudanese soldiers who refused to allow the aircraft to leave, fearing that the crew were on the airfield to document Sudanese military war crimes at the airfield. The Sudanese soldiers threatened to rape, then sell, two female members of the crew and stated that the entire crew would be executed. The US crew barricaded the aircraft and refused to allow the Sudanese soldiers to enter during a tense stand-off.

After four hours, a locally assigned US military liaison was able to persuade the Sudanese airfield commander to allow the aircraft to depart without further incident.

== Lineage ==
- Constituted as the 79th Air Rescue Squadron on 17 October 1952
- Activated on 14 November 1952

Discontinued and inactivated on 18 September 1960

- Activated on 10 May 1961 (not organized)

Organized on 18 June 1961
Redesignated 79th Aerospace Rescue and Recovery Squadron on 8 January 1966
Inactivated on 30 June 1972

- Redesignated 79th Rescue Flight on 1 April 1993

Activated on 1 May 1993
Inactivated on 2 July 1998

- Redesignated 79th Rescue Squadron on 22 January 2003

Activated on 14 March 2003

=== Assignments ===
- 11th Air Rescue Group, 14 November 1952 (attached to Far East Air Forces, until 1 June 1953, then to 6319th Air Base Wing)
- 2d Air Rescue Group, 16 February 1954 (remained attached to 6319th Air Base Wing to 1 August 1954, to Far East Air Forces to 10 May 1955 then to Seventh Air Force until an unknown date)
- Air Rescue Service, 24 June 1958 – 18 September 1960
- Military Air Transport Service, 10 May 1961 (not organized)
- Air Rescue Service (later Aerospace Rescue and Recovery Service), 18 June 1961
- Pacific Aerospace Rescue and Recovery Center (later 41st Aerospace Rescue and Recovery Wing), 1 April 1967 – 30 June 1972
- 321st Operations Group, 1 May 1993
- 321st Missile Group, 1 July 1994 – 2 July 1998
- 355th Operations Group, 14 March 2003
- 563d Rescue Group, 1 Oct 2003 – present

=== Stations ===
- Andersen Air Force Base, Guam, 14 November 1952 – 18 September 1960
- Andersen Air Force Base, Guam, 18 June 1961 – 30 June 1972
- Grand Forks Air Force Base, North Dakota, 1 May 1993 – 2 July 1998
- Davis-Monthan Air Force Base, Arizona, 14 Mar 2003 – present

=== Aircraft ===
- Boeing SB-29 Superfortress, 1952–1956
- Douglas C-47 Skytrain, 1952–1954
- Sikorsky SH-19, 1955–1960
- Douglas SC-54 Skymaster (later HC-54), 1956–1960, 1961–1966
- Lockheed HC-130, 1966–1972, 2003–
- Kaman HH-43 Huskie, 1971–1972
- Bell HH-1 Huey, 1993–1998
- HC-130P Combat King, 2003–2012
- HC-130J Combat King II, 2012 – present
