= 354th Fighter Squadron =

US Air Force unit

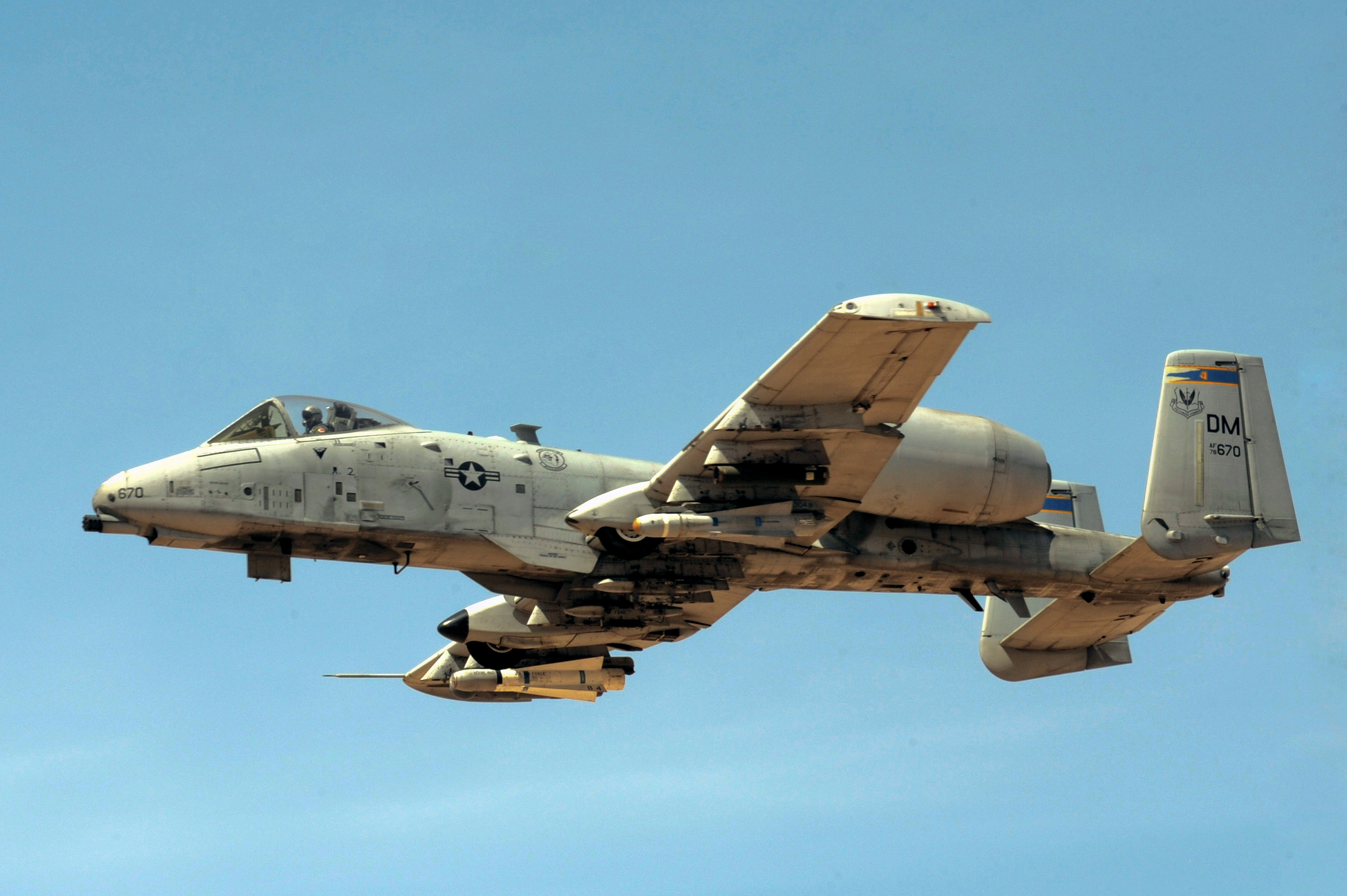
- An A-10 Thunderbolt from the 354th Fighter Squadron (Note: Taken during a strafing run at Barry M. Goldwater Air Force Range near Wellton, AZ, 5 May 2014)
- Active: 1942–1946; 1952–1958; 1962–1982; 1991–2024
- Country: United States
- Branch: United States Air Force
- Role: Close Air Support, Air Interdiction Forward Air Control Airborne, and Combat Search and rescue
- Nickname: Bulldogs
- Engagements: European Theater of Operations; Vietnam War
- Decorations: Distinguished Unit Citation; Presidential Unit Citation; Air Force Outstanding Unit Award with Combat "V" Device; Air Force Outstanding Unit Award; Vietnamese Gallantry Cross with Palm

Insignia
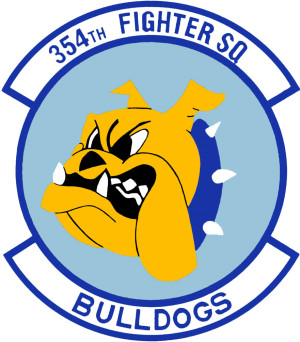
- 354th Fighter Squadron emblem (Note: Approved 16 August 1994.)

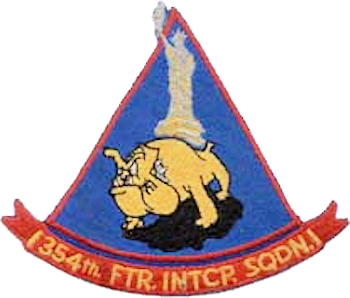
- Original 354th Fighter Squadron emblem (Note: Approved 19 November 1943. Description: On an arc segment of a circle, arc to base medium blue, border red, piped white, a caricatured English bull dog yellow, outlined black, wearing gray collar with white spokes about the neck, standing in front of a silhouette of the Statue of Liberty gray; bull dog casting black shadow toward base.))
- World War II fuselage code: WR
- Tail code post 1970: DM

The 354th Fighter Squadron is an inactive United States Air Force. It was last stationed at Davis-Monthan Air Force Base, where it was part of the 355th Fighter Wing, Arizona. It operated A-10 Thunderbolt II aircraft conducting close air support missions.

The squadron conducted close air support, air Interdiction, forward air control – airborne, and combat search and rescue for theater commanders worldwide.

== History ==
=== World War II ===
The 354th flew combat missions in the European Theater of Operations from 14 September 1943 to 25 April 1945.

=== Vietnam War ===
The squadron flew combat missions in Southeast Asia from 13 March to 12 June 1965, 28 November 1965 – 7 October 1970, and c. 14 January–3 July 1973.

=== Training ===
It conducted combat crew training from, 1971–1982 and forward air control training since 1991. In February 2015, the squadron was deployed to Spangdahlem Air Base, Germany, in support of Operation Atlantic Resolve. Twelve A-10s and approximately 300 airmen were deployed. The unit will train alongside NATO allies and deploy to locations in Eastern European NATO nations to further enhance interoperability. The A-10s were the first of several theater security package deployments to Europe, U.S. Air Force officials said, adding that rotations generally will last six months, depending on mission and United States European Command requirements.

In mid-October 2023, the A-10 aircraft of the 354th Fighter Squadron were deployed to the US Central Command to enhance air operations throughout the Middle East in response to the Gaza war. The squadron finished its last operational deployment in April 2024 and flew its last operational mission in June. Its A-10s were transferred to the 190th Fighter Squadron of the Idaho Air National Guard or moved across Davis-Monthan to the "boneyard". and inactivated in September.

== Lineage ==
- Constituted as the 354th Fighter Squadron and activated on 12 November 1942

Redesignated 354th Fighter Squadron, Single Engine on 21 August 1944
Inactivated on 20 November 1946

- Redesignated 354th Fighter-Interceptor Squadron on 11 September 1952

Activated on 1 November 1952
Inactivated on 8 January 1958

- Redesignated 354th Tactical Fighter Squadron and activated on 13 April 1962 (not organized)

Organized on 25 April 1962
Redesignated 354th Tactical Fighter Training Squadron on 1 April 1979
Inactivated on 30 April 1982

- Redesignated 354th Fighter Squadron and activated on 1 November 1991.

Inactivated c. 20 September 2024

=== Assignments ===
- 355th Fighter Group: 12 November 1942 – 20 November 1946
- 27th Air Division: 1 November 1952
- 533d Air Defense Group: 16 February 1953
- 355th Fighter Group: 18 August 1955 – 8 January 1958
- Tactical Air Command: 13 April 1962 (not organized)
- 831st Air Division: 25 April 1962
- 355th Tactical Fighter Wing: 8 July 1962
- Thirteenth Air Force: 10 December 1970
- 4453d Combat Crew Training Wing: 1 April 1971
- 355th Tactical Fighter Wing (later 355th Tactical Training Wing): 1 July 1971 – 30 April 1982
- 602d Air Control Wing: 1 November 1991
- 355th Operations Group: 1 May 1992 – c. 20 September 2024

=== Stations ===
- Orlando Army Air Base, Florida, 12 November 1942
- Zephyrhills Army Air Field, Florida, 30 January 1943
- Norfolk Municipal Airport, Virginia, 18 February 1943
- Philadelphia Municipal Airport, Pennsylvania, 4 March 1943
- Millville Army Air Field, New Jersey, 5 May - 16 June 1943
- RAF Steeple Morden, England, 6 July 1943
- Gablingen, Germany, 17 July 1945
- Schweinfurt, Germany, 15 April 1946
- Mitchel Field, New York, 1 August – 20 November 1946
- Long Beach Municipal Airport, California, 1 November 1952
- Oxnard Air Force Base, California, 16 December 1952 (operated From: Moody Air Force Base, Georgia, 8 May – 10 June 1955
- McGhee Tyson Airport, Tennessee, 18 August 1955 – 8 January 1958
- George Air Force Base, California, 25 April 1962 (operated from Eielson Air Force Base, Alaska 24 January – 14 February 1964, Incirlik Air Base, Turkey 5 May – 18 September 1964)
- McConnell Air Force Base, Kansas, 15 October 1964 – 27 November 1965 (deployed to Kadena Air Base, Okinawa, then Korat Royal Thai Air Force Base, Thailand (6 March – 18 June 1965)
- Takhli Royal Thai Air Force Base, Thailand, 28 November 1965
- Davis–Monthan Air Force Base, Arizona, 15 April 1970 – 30 April 1982 (deployed to Korat Royal Thai Air Force Base, Thailand 14 January – 4 July 1973)
- Davis–Monthan Air Force Base, Arizona, 1 November 1991
- McChord Air Force Base, Washington, 5 January 1993
- Davis–Monthan Air Force Base, Arizona, 1 October 1994 – c. 20 September 2024

=== Aircraft ===
- Republic P-47 Thunderbolt (1943–1944)
- North American P-51 Mustang (1944–1946, 1952–1953)
- Lockheed F-94C Starfire (1953–1955)
- North American F-86D Sabre (1955–1957)
- Republic F-105 Thunderchief (1962–1970)
- LTV A-7D Corsair II (1971–1979)
- Fairchild Republic A-10 Thunderbolt II (1979–1982, 1991–2024)

=== Awards and campaigns ===
Award streamer	Award	Dates	Notes
	Distinguished Unit Citation	5 April 1944	354th Fighter Squadron, Germany
	Presidential Unit Citation	5 May 1965-17 June 1965	354th Tactical Fighter Squadron, Southeast Asia
	Presidential Unit Citation	1 January 1966-10 October 1966	354th Tactical Fighter Squadron, Southeast Asia
	Presidential Unit Citation	11–12 August 1967 and 24–28 October 1967	354th Tactical Fighter Squadron, Southeast Asia
	Presidential Unit Citation	12 April 1968-30 April 1969	354th Tactical Fighter Squadron, Southeast Asia
	Presidential Unit Citation	10 October 1972-30 April 1973	354th Tactical Fighter Squadron, Southeast Asia
	Air Force Outstanding Unit Award with Combat "V" Device	12 October 1966-11 April 1967	354th Tactical Fighter Squadron
	Air Force Outstanding Unit Award with Combat "V" Device	12 April 1967-11 April 1968	354th Tactical Fighter Squadron
	Air Force Outstanding Unit Award with Combat "V" Device	1 July 1969-15 October 1970	354th Tactical Fighter Squadron
	Air Force Outstanding Unit Award with Combat "V" Device	1 June 1999-31 August 1999	354th Fighter Squadron
	Air Force Outstanding Unit Award	1 July 1956-30 June 1957	354th Fighter-Interceptor Squadron
	Air Force Outstanding Unit Award	1 Jul 1971-11 Jan 1973	354th Tactical Fighter Squadron
	Air Force Outstanding Unit Award	1 October 1976-31 May 1978	354th Tactical Fighter Squadron
	Air Force Outstanding Unit Award	[1 November 1991]-30 April 1992	354th Tactical Fighter Squadron
	Air Force Outstanding Unit Award	1 June 1995-31 May 1997	354th Fighter Squadron
	Air Force Outstanding Unit Award	1 June 1998-31 May 2000	354th Fighter Squadron
	Air Force Outstanding Unit Award	1 June 2002–31 May 2004	354th Fighter Squadron
	Air Force Outstanding Unit Award	1 June 2004–31 May 2006	354th Fighter Squadron
	Air Force Outstanding Unit Award	1 June 2007–31 May 2009	354th Fighter Squadron
	Vietnamese Gallantry Cross with Palm	1 April 1966-28 January 1973	354th Fighter Squadron

Campaign Streamer	Campaign	Dates	Notes
	Air Offensive, Europe	6 July 1943 – 5 June 1944	354th Fighter Squadron
	Normandy	6 June 1944 – 24 July 1944	354th Fighter Squadron
	Northern France	25 July 1944 – 14 September 1944	354th Fighter Squadron
	Rhineland	15 September 1944 – 21 March 1945	354th Fighter Squadron
	Ardennes-Alsace	16 December 1944 – 25 January 1945	354th Fighter Squadron
	Central Europe	22 March 1944 – 21 May 1945	354th Fighter Squadron
	Air Combat, EAME Theater	6 July 1943 – 11 May 1945	354th Fighter Squadron
	Vietnam Defensive	6 March 1965 – 30 January 1966	354th Tactical Fighter Squadron
	Vietnam Air	31 January 1966 – 28 June 1966	354th Tactical Fighter Squadron
	Vietnam Air Offensive	29 June 1966 – 8 March 1967	354th Tactical Fighter Squadron
	Vietnam Air Offensive, Phase II	9 March 1967 – 31 March 1968	354th Tactical Fighter Squadron
	Vietnam Air/Ground	22 January 1968 – 7 July 1968	354th Tactical Fighter Squadron
	Vietnam Air Offensive, Phase III	1 April 1968 – 31 October 1968	354th Tactical Fighter Squadron
	Vietnam Air Offensive, Phase IV	1 November 1968 – 22 February 1969	354th Tactical Fighter Squadron
	Tet 1969/Counteroffensive	23 February 1969 – 8 June 1969	354th Tactical Fighter Squadron
	Vietnam Summer-Fall 1969	9 June 1969 – 31 October 1969	354th Tactical Fighter Squadron
	Vietnam Winter-Spring 1970	3 November 1969 – 30 April 1970	354th Tactical Fighter Squadron
	Sanctuary Counteroffensive	1 May 1970 – 15 April 1970	354th Tactical Fighter Squadron
	Southwest Monsoon	(Note: The squadron received credit for participating in this campaign, which began on 1 July 1970, although it had departed the theater on 15 April 1970.)	354th Tactical Fighter Squadron
	Vietnam Ceasefire Campaign	14 January 1973 – 28 January 1973	354th Tactical Fighter Squadron
	Southwest Asia Cease-Fire	12 April 1991 – 30 November 1995	354th Fighter Squadron
	World War II Army of Occupation (Germany)	9 May 1945 – 1 August 1946	354th Fighter Squadron
