= RAF Steeple Morden =

Former RAF station in Hertfordshire, England

RAF Steeple Morden USAAF Station 122
- Steeple Morden, Cambridgeshire in England
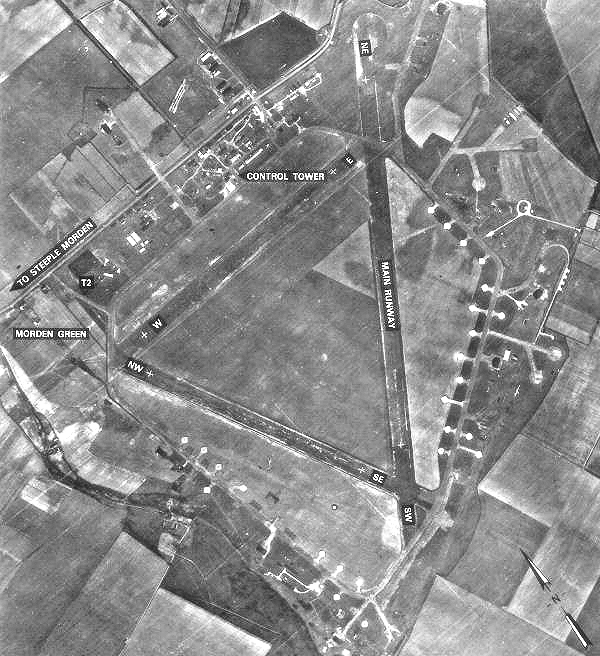
- Steeple Morden - 13 April 1947

Site information
- Type: Royal Air Force station
- Code: KR
- Owner: Air Ministry
- Operator: Royal Air Force; United States Army Air Forces
- Controlled by: RAF Bomber Command; Eighth Air Force; RAF Fighter Command

Location
- Shown within Cambridgeshire RAF Steeple Morden (the United Kingdom)
- Coordinates: 52.06°N 0.10°W

Site history
- Built: 1940
- Built by: John Laing & Son Ltd
- In use: 1940-1946
- Battles/wars: European Theatre of World War II; Air Offensive, Europe July 1942 - May 1945

Airfield information
Runways
Direction	Length and surface
00/00
00/00
00/00

Royal Air Force Steeple Morden or more simply RAF Steeple Morden is a former Royal Air Force station located 3.5 miles (5.6 km) west of Royston, Hertfordshire, England.

== History ==
=== RAF Bomber Command use ===
Between 1940 and September 1942, Steeple Morden was a grass satellite dispersal airfield used by No. 11 Operational Training Unit of RAF Bomber Command flying Vickers Wellingtons from RAF Bassingbourn.

During this time No. 3 (Coastal) Operational Training Unit RAF (OTU) also used the airfield.

=== USAAF use ===
When the airfield was turned over for American use, Steeple Morden was assigned USAAF designation Station 122. Hard-surface runways were laid down, along with concrete hardstands and a permanent T-2 hangar.

==== 3d Photographic Reconnaissance Group ====
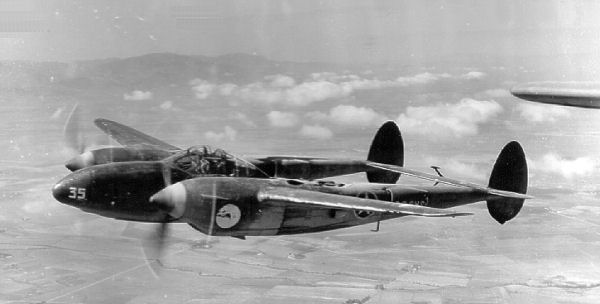
Lockheed F-4 Lightning of the 3d Photo Recon Group

Although not planned for use until 1943 Steeple Morden was first used by the United States Army Air Forces Eighth Air Force 3d Photographic Reconnaissance Group, arriving from RAF Membury on 16 October 1942. The 3d consisted of the 5th, 12th, 13th, 14th, 15th and 23d squadrons and only stayed at the airfield until 10 December, departing for La Senia, Algeria as part of Operation Torch.

During the stay of the 3d PRG, Lieutenant-Colonel Elliott Roosevelt, son of Franklin D. Roosevelt served as commander and also flew an F-4 Lightning.

Between January 1943 and May 1943 the airfield was used by No. 17 OTU which used Bristol Blenheims.

==== 355th Fighter Group ====
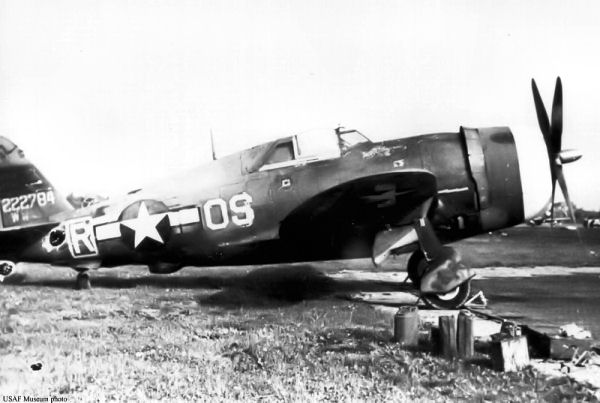
Republic P-47D Thunderbolt of the 357th Fighter Squadron.

With the departure of the photo-recon squadrons, the 355th Fighter Group, arrived from Philadelphia Municipal Airport on 9 July 1943. The group was under the command of the 65th Fighter Wing of the VIII Fighter Command. Aircraft of the group were identified by white around their cowling and tail.

The group consisted of the following squadrons:

- 354th Fighter Squadron (WR)
- 357th Fighter Squadron (OS)
- 358th Fighter Squadron (YF)

The 355th FG flew its first combat mission, a fighter sweep over Belgium, on 14 September 1943 and afterwards served primarily as escort for Boeing B-17 Flying Fortress/Consolidated B-24 Liberator bombers that attacked industrial areas of Berlin, marshalling yards at Karlsruhe, an airfield at Neuberg, oil refineries at Misburg, synthetic oil plants at Gelsenkirchen, locks at Minden, and other objectives. The group also flew fighter sweeps, area patrols, and bombing missions, striking such targets as air parks, locomotives, bridges, radio stations, and armoured cars.

On 5 April 1944, shortly after converting from Republic P-47 Thunderbolts to North American P-51 Mustangs, the group successfully bombed and strafed German airfields during a snow squall, a mission for which the group was awarded a Distinguished Unit Citation.

The group provided fighter cover for Allied forces landing in Normandy on 6 June 1944, and afterwards hit transportation facilities to cut enemy supply lines. Hit fuel dumps, locomotives, and other targets in support of ground forces during the breakthrough at Saint-Lô in July.

The 355th Fighter Group flew its last combat mission on 25 April 1945. On 3 July the group transferred to Gablingen, Germany for duty with United States Air Forces in Europe as part of the army of occupation. Transferred, without personnel and equipment, to Mitchel Field New York on 1 August 1946, and was inactivated on 20 November.

==== 4th Fighter Group ====
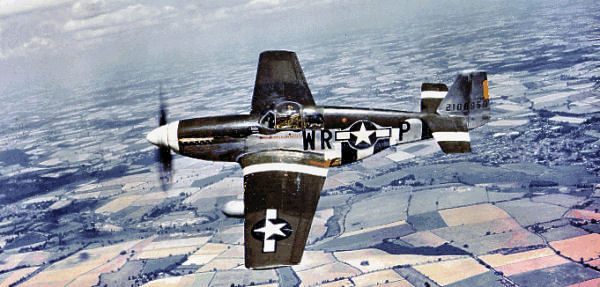
North American P-51B Mustang "The Iowa Beaut" of the 354th Fighter Squadron.

The 4th Fighter Group transferred to Steeple Morden in July 1945 replacing the 355th FG. The unit stayed until November when it returned to Camp Kilmer, New Jersey and was inactivated.

The group consisted of the following squadrons:

- 334th Fighter Squadron (QP), former ES71 (XR)
- 335th Fighter Squadron (WD), former ES121 (AV)
- 336th Fighter Squadron (VF), former ES133 (MD)

=== Postwar use ===
With the departure of the Americans, Steeple Morden was transferred to RAF Fighter Command on 1 November 1945 and then was closed down on 1 September 1946 and abandoned. It was sold to private interests between 1960 and 1961 and was largely returned to agriculture.

== Current use ==
With the end of military control, Steeple Morden was returned to agricultural use. The former airfield is virtually unrecognizable. A few single-width concrete farm roads, which are remnants of the perimeter track and runways are all that remains.

== See also ==
- List of former Royal Air Force stations
