= 55th Rescue Squadron =

US Air Force unit

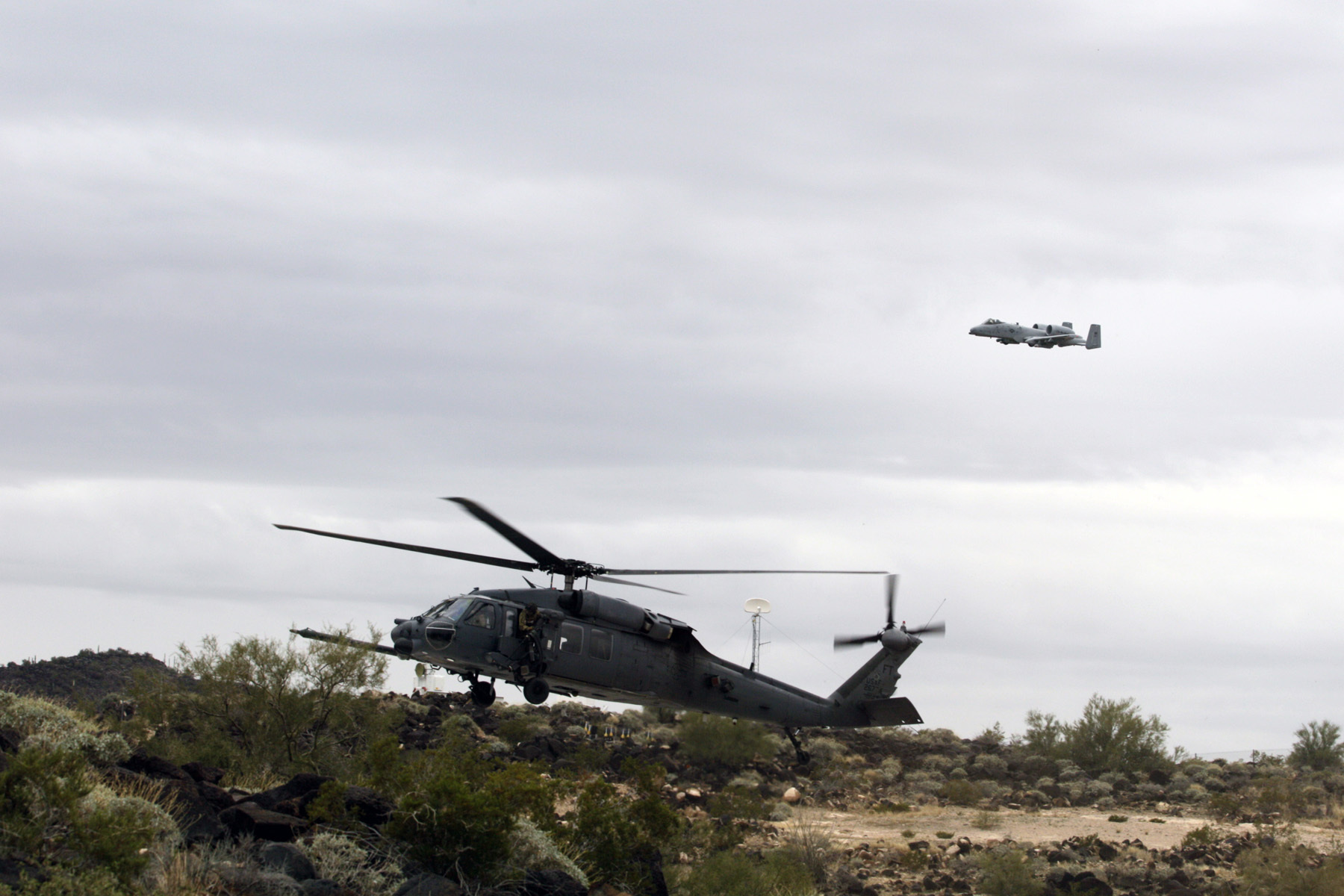
- An A-10 Thunderbolt II provides cover for a 55th HH-60 Pave Hawk during an exercise
- Active: 1952–1960; 1961–1999; 2003–present
- Country: United States
- Branch: United States Air Force
- Role: Search and Rescue
- Part of: Air Combat Command
- Garrison/HQ: Davis-Monthan Air Force Base
- Nickname: Night Hawks Night Wings (1984-1988)
- Mottos: Haec Ago Ut Alii Vivant; These Things We Do That Others May Live
- Engagements: Desert Storm; Kosovo War
- Decorations: Air Force Outstanding Unit Award with Combat "V" Device; Air Force Meritorious Unit Award; Navy Meritorious Unit Commendation; Coast Guard Meritorious Unit Commendation; Air Force Outstanding Unit Award

Insignia
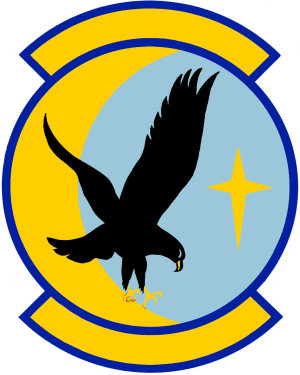
- 55th Rescue Squadron emblem (approved 12 December 1988)

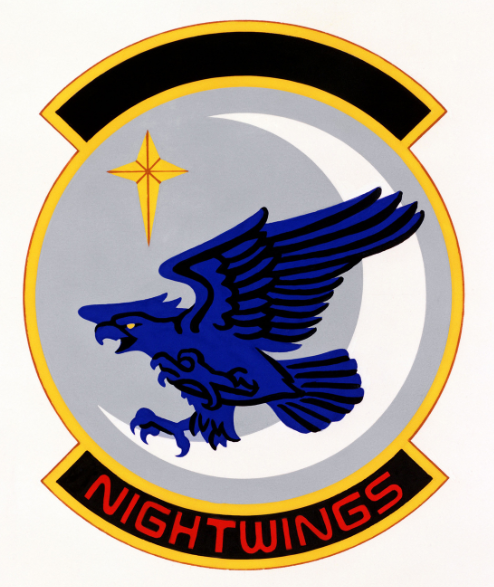
- 55th Aerospace Rescue and Recovery Squadron emblem (approved 12 December 1984)

The 55th Rescue Squadron is an aviation unit of the United States Air Force. It operates the Sikorsky HH-60W Jolly Green II helicopter and provides rapidly deployable combat search and rescue forces to theater commanders worldwide. 55th used to use the HH-60G Pave Hawk until switching to the HH-60W Jolly Green II. They tactically employ the HH-60W helicopter and its crew in hostile environments to recover downed aircrew and isolated personnel during day, night, or marginal weather conditions. The squadron also conducts military operations other than war including civil search and rescue, disaster relief, international aid, emergency medical evacuation, and counter-drug activities.

Since 2003, the squadron provided rapidly deployable combat search and rescue forces worldwide; and deployed aircraft and crews in response to national disasters, domestic search and rescue, and medical evacuation ("MEDEVAC") missions.

== History ==
=== North Atlantic Rescue ===
The 55th Air Rescue Squadron was activated on 14 November 1952, at Thule Air Force Base, Greenland, where it replaced Flight E, 6th Air Rescue Squadron, when Air Rescue Service expanded its squadrons to groups and replaced their flights with new squadrons. It remained at Thule and trained and performed rescue and recovery missions until March 1960, when it moved to Kindley Air Force Base, Bermuda, where it was inactivated on 18 June 1960.

=== Reactivation ===
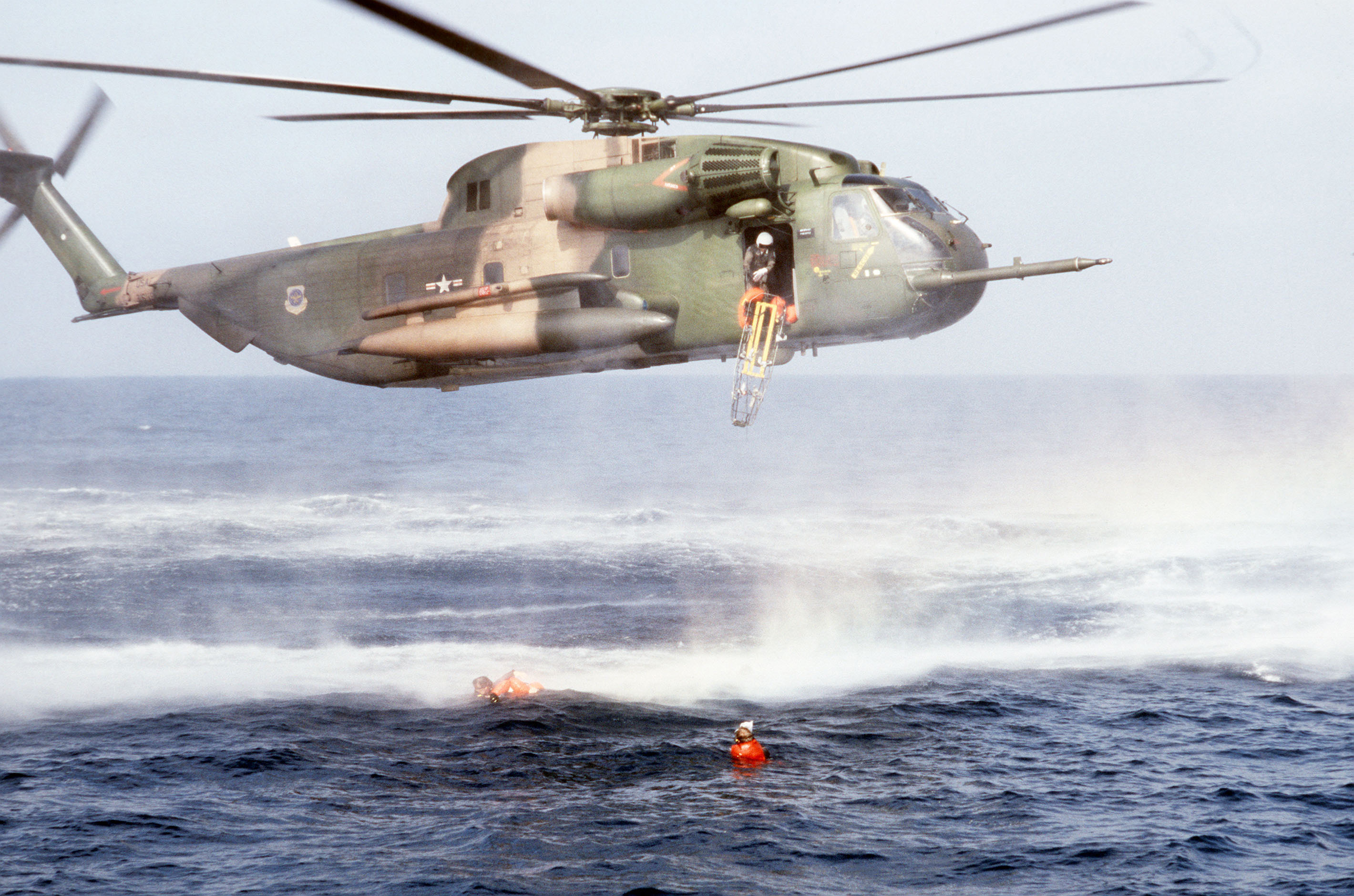
A 55th HH-53C over the Gulf of Mexico, 1978.

The squadron was reorganized at Kindley on 18 June 1961. Until January 1966 the unit supported crewed spacecraft recovery operations. In January 1966, it was renamed the 55th Aerospace Rescue and Recovery Squadron. It moved to McCoy Air Force Base, Florida in February 1970. From McCoy, and after June 1971, from Eglin Air Force Base, Florida it provided coverage for Apollo missions through the early 1970s.

=== Special operations ===
In 1988 the rescue role changed to special operations missions. During Operation Just Cause the 55th SOS performed combat search and rescue in Panama between 20 December 1989 and 14 January 1990. This was repeated during the 1991 Gulf War between January and March 1991, and again in the Persian Gulf region and the Kosovo, in 1998–1999. On 25 February 1993, the 55th moved to Hurlburt Field, Florida, where the squadron was inactivated on 11 November 1999.

=== Return to rescue mission ===
On 22 January 2003, the squadron was reactivated at Davis-Monthan Air Force Base, Arizona (USA). Since 2003, the squadron provided rapidly deployable combat search and rescue forces worldwide; and deployed aircraft and crews in response to national disasters, domestic search and rescue, and medical evacuation missions, like during Hurricane Katrina.

The unit has changed to the Sikorsky HH-60W Jolly Green II.

== Lineage ==
- Constituted as the 55th Air Rescue Squadron on 17 October 1952

Activated on 14 November 1952
Discontinued and inactivated on 18 June 1960

- Activated on 10 May 1961 (not organized)

Organized on 18 June 1961
Redesignated 55th Aerospace Rescue and Recovery Squadron on 8 January 1966
Redesignated 55th Special Operations Squadron on 1 March 1988
Inactivated on 11 November 1999

- Redesignated 55th Rescue Squadron on 22 January 2003

Activated on 14 March 2003

=== Assignments ===
- 6th Air Rescue Group, 14 November 1952
- Air Rescue Service, 18 February 1958 – 18 June 1960
- Military Air Transport Service, 10 May 1961 (not organized)
- Air Rescue Service (later Aerospace Rescue and Recovery Service), 18 June 1961
- 39th Aerospace Rescue and Recovery Wing (later 39th Special Operations Wing), 1 January 1970
- 1st Special Operations Wing, 18 April 1989
- 1st Special Operations Group (later 16th Operations Group), 22 September 1992 – 11 November 1999
- 355th Operations Group, 14 March 2003
- 563d Rescue Group, 1 October 2003 – present

=== Stations ===
- Thule Air Force Base, Greenland, 14 November 1952
- Kindley Air Force Base, Bermuda, 17 March – 18 June 1960
- Kindley Air Force Base, Bermuda, 18 June 1961
- McCoy Air Force Base, Florida, 27 February 1970
- Eglin Air Force Base, Florida, 25 June 1971
- Hurlburt Field, Florida, 25 February 1993 – 11 November 1999
- Davis-Monthan Air Force Base, Arizona, 14 March 2003 – present

=== Aircraft ===
- Boeing SB-17 Flying Fortress (1952–1955)
- Douglas SC-47 Skytrain (1952–1954)
- Sikorsky H-19 (later SH-19, HH-19)(1953–1957, 1961–1963)
- Grumman SA-16A Albatross (1953–1959)
- Piasecki YH-21 Work Horse (1953–1955)
- Piasecki SH-21 Work Horse (1956–1960)
- Douglas SC-54 Skymaster (later HC-54) (1956–1957, 1959–1960, 1961–1964)
- Kaman HH-43 Huskie (1963–1964)
- Boeing HC-97 Stratofreighter (1964–1966)
- Lockheed HC-130 Hercules (1966–1988)
- Sikorsky HH-53 Super Jolly Green Giant (1973–1980)
- Sikorsky HH-3 Jolly Green Giant (1980–1982)
- Sikorsky MH-60G Pave Hawk (1982–1999)
- Sikorsky HH-60G Pave Hawk (2003 – 2023)
- Sikorsky HH-60W Jolly Green II (2023 -
