= Philadelphia Municipal Airport =

Airport in Mississippi, United States

- IATA: none; ICAO: KMPE; FAA LID: MPE

Summary
- Airport type: Public
- Owner: City of Philadelphia
- Serves: Philadelphia, Mississippi
- Elevation AMSL: 458 ft (140 m)
- Coordinates: 32°47′57″N 089°07′34″W
- Website: http://www.philadelphiathecity.com/philadelphia-municipal-airport

Map
- Location of airport in Mississippi MPE (the United States)

Runways
Direction	Length		Surface
Direction	ft	m	Surface
18/36	5,001	1,524	Asphalt

Statistics (2023)
- Aircraft operations (year ending 2/3/2023): 9,552
- Based aircraft: 10
- Source: Federal Aviation Administration

Philadelphia Municipal Airport (ICAO: KMPE, FAA LID: MPE) is a public use airport in Neshoba County, Mississippi, United States. It is owned by the City of Philadelphia and located two nautical miles (4 km) northwest of its central business district. This airport is included in the National Plan of Integrated Airport Systems for 2011–2015, which categorized it as a general aviation facility.

Although many U.S. airports use the same three-letter location identifier for the FAA and IATA, this airport is assigned MPE by the FAA but has no designation from the IATA (which assigned MPE to Griswold Airport in Madison, Connecticut).

== Facilities and aircraft ==
Philadelphia Municipal Airport covers an area of 60 acres (24 ha) at an elevation of 458 feet (140 m) above mean sea level. It has one runway designated 18/36 with an asphalt surface measuring 5,001 by 75 feet (1,524 x 23 m).

For the 12-month period ending February 3, 2023, the airport had 9,552 aircraft operations, an average of 26 per day: 99% general aviation and 2% military. At that time there were 10 aircraft based at this airport: 6 single-engine, 2 multi-engine, and 2 jet.

== See also ==
- List of airports in Mississippi
