= 7th Expeditionary Airborne Command and Control Squadron =

7th Expeditionary Airborne Command and Control Squadron

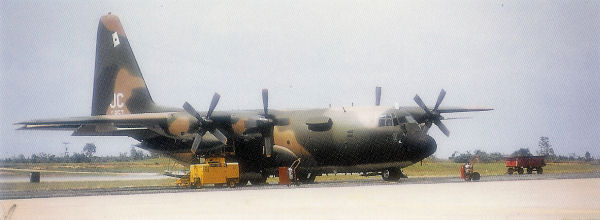
- EC-130E Hercules of the 7th ACCS at Korat (Note: Aircraft is Lockheed EC-130E-LM Hercules serial 62-1857, taken 10 May 1974. This aircraft survived the Vietnam War and was converted to C-130E-II, later EC-130E in 1976 at Davis-Monthan AFB, Arizona.)
- Active: 1942-1944; 1944-1946; 1954-1966; 1968-1998; 2008-present
- Country: United States
- Branch: United States Air Force
- Role: Airborne Command and Control
- Part of: Air Force Combat Command
- Nickname: Moon Beam (SEA era)
- Engagements: World War II; Vietnam War; United States invasion of Grenada; Gulf War
- Decorations: Presidential Unit Citation; Air Force Outstanding Unit Award with Combat "V" Device; Air Force Outstanding Unit Award; Philippine Presidential Unit Citation; Republic of Vietnam Gallantry Cross with Palm

Insignia
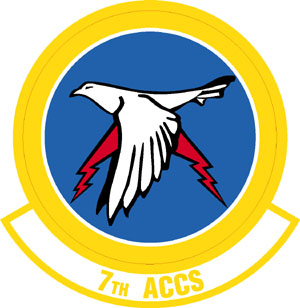
- 7th Expeditionary Airborne Command and Control Squadron emblem (Note: Approved 17 February 1977, revised 1994.)

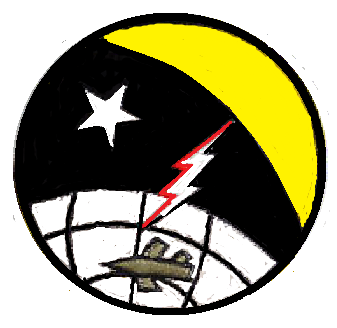
- 7th Airborne Command Control Squadron emblem (Southeast Asia)

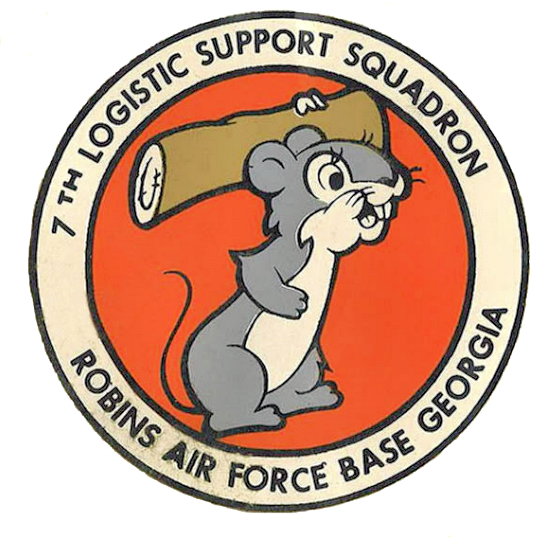
- 7th Logistic Support Squadron emblem (Note: Approved 28 February 1956.)

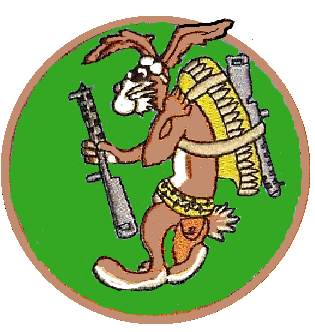
- 7th Combat Cargo Squadron emblem (Note: Approved 5 July 1945.)

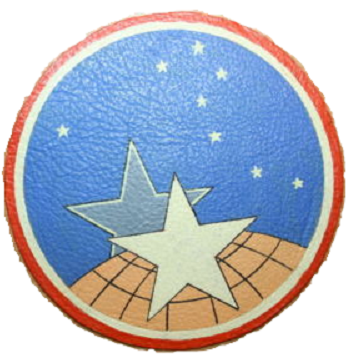
- 7th Ferrying Squadron emblem

The 7th Expeditionary Airborne Command and Control Squadron is part of the 379th Air Expeditionary Wing at Al Udeid Air Base, Qatar. It operates the E-8 Joint STARS aircraft, conducting airborne command and control missions. The squadron has performed the airborne command and control mission since 1968, when it was activated in Vietnam. In 1985, the squadron was consolidated with three earlier units: The 7th Ferrying Squadron, which helped deliver aircraft to the Soviet Union from 1942 until 1944; the 7th Combat Cargo Squadron, which performed combat airlift missions in the Southwest Pacific Theater from 1944 until V-J Day, then became part of the Occupation Forces in Japan until inactivating in 1948; and the 7th Air Transport Squadron, Special, which provided airlift support for the United States' special weapons program from 1954 to 1966.

== History ==
=== World War II ferrying operations ===
The squadron's first predecessor was activated at Seattle Airport, Washington in March 1942 as the 7th Ferrying Squadron. The 7th ferried lend-lease aircraft to Alaska for turnover to the Soviet Union from June 1942 until disbanding in March 1944.

=== Southwest Pacific combat airlift ===
The second predecessor of the squadron was activated at Syracuse Army Air Base, New York on 1 May 1944 as the 7th Combat Cargo Squadron. It deployed to the Southwest Pacific Theater later that year and performed airlift until September 1945. It became part of the Occupation Forces in Japan until inactivating in early 1946. It was disbanded in inactive status on 8 October 1948.

=== Special weapons airlift ===
The 7th Logistic Support Squadron is the squadron's third predecessor. It was established at Robins Air Force Base, Georgia in 1954 as an Air Materiel Command unit. Its mission was to provide worldwide airlift of nuclear weapons and related equipment, with a secondary mission to airlift other Department of Defense cargo as required when space was available, using its Douglas C-124 Globemaster IIs. The squadron also provided airlift support during Cuban Missile Crisis from 17–28 October 1962.

In 1963, the squadron was transferred to Military Air Transport Service (MATS) in a trial to see if MATS airlift units could perform the special weapons transport mission. C-124 Globemaster II strategic transport squadron flying worldwide airlift operations. A year later it became the 7th Air Transport Squadron, Special. The squadron was inactivated on 8 January 1966, when MATS became Military Airlift Command and its squadrons became Military Airlift Squadrons. Its personnel and equipment were transferred to the 58th Military Airlift Squadron, which was simultaneously activated. (Note: The squadron could not be redesignated as a Military Airlift Squadron because the 7th Troop Carrier Squadron took the designation 7th Military Airlift Squadron.)

=== Airborne command and control ===
The 7th Airborne Command and Control Squadron was activated at Da Nang Air Base, South Vietnam in March 1968 and performed airborne battlefield command and control (ABCCC) mission in Southeast Asia from its activation until 15 August 1973 and controlled airborne forces during the recovery of the SS Mayagüez in May 1975, in Grenada from, 23 October–21 November 1983, in Panama from, December 1989–January 1992, and in Southwest Asia from, 1 September 1990 – 16 March 1991.

In 1994, the 7th flag was moved from Keesler Air Force Base, Mississippi, to Offutt Air Force Base, Nebraska where it transitioned from Lockheed EC-130 aircraft flying the ABCCC mission to the Boeing EC-135 aircraft flying the Operation Looking Glass mission in support of nuclear command and control for United States Strategic Command. The EC-130E aircraft and all squadron personnel moved to Davis-Monthan Air Force Base, Arizona where they continued performing the ABCCC mission as the 42d ACCS. In October 1998, the Looking Glass mission was transferred to the Navy's Boeing E-6 Mercury fleet, the last of the US Air Force's EC-135 fleet was retired, and the 7th was inactivated.

In March 2008, the unit was converted to provisional status and reactivated - this time as the 7th Expeditionary Airborne Command and Control Squadron to be the forward operating squadron for E-8 Joint STARS, supporting the United States Central Command Area of Responsibility.

== Lineage ==
7th Ferrying Squadron

- Constituted as the 7th Air Corps Ferrying Squadron on 18 February 1942

Activated on 24 March 1942
Redesignated 7th Ferrying Squadron on 12 May 1943
Disbanded on 1 April 1944

- Reconstituted and consolidated with the 7th Combat Cargo Squadron, the 7th Air Transport Squadron and the 7th Airborne Command and Control Squadron as the 7th Airborne Command and Control Squadron on 19 September 1985

7th Combat Cargo Squadron
Constituted as the 7th Combat Cargo Squadron on 25 April 1944
Activated on 1 May 1944
Inactivated on 15 January 1946
Disbanded on 8 October 1948

- Reconstituted and consolidated with the 7th Ferrying Squadron, the 7th Air Transport Squadron and the 7th Airborne Command and Control Squadron as the 7th Airborne Command and Control Squadron on 19 September 1985

7th Air Transport Squadron
Constituted as the 7th Logistics Support Squadron on 22 June 1954
Activated on 18 October 1954
Redesignated 7th Air Transport Squadron, Special on 1 July 1964 (Note: This squadron is not related to the 7th Airlift Squadron, which was designated the 7th Air Transport Squadron, Heavy from 1 January 1965 to 8 January 1966, or to the 7th Air Transport Squadron (Transition Training Unit), which was organized by Military Air Transport Service at Great Falls Air Force Base, Montana on 1 June 48 and redesignated 1272d Transition Training Unit on 1 October 1948.)
Discontinued and inactivated on 8 January 1966

- Consolidated with the 7th Ferrying Squadron, the 7th Combat Cargo Squadron and the 7th Airborne Command and Control Squadron as the 7th Airborne Command and Control Squadron on 19 September 1985

7th Expeditionary Airborne Command and Control Squadron

- Constituted as the 7th Airborne Command and Control Squadron and activated on 13 February 1968 (not organized)

Organized on 1 March 1968
Consolidated with the 7th Ferrying Squadron, the 7th Combat Cargo Squadron and the 7th Air Transport Squadron on 19 September 1985
Inactivated on 1 October 1998

- Redesignated 7th Expeditionary Airborne Command and Control Squadron and converted to provisional status on 19 March 2008

Activated on 27 March 2008

=== Assignments ===
- Northwest Sector, Ferrying Command (later 7th Ferrying Group), 18 February 1942 – 1 April 1944
- 2d Combat Cargo Group, 1 May 1944 – 15 January 1946
- Warner Robins Air Materiel Area, 18 October 1954
- 3079th Aviation Depot Wing, 6 February 1955
- 39th Logistics Support Group, 1 July 1962
- 62d Troop Carrier Wing, 1 July 1963
- 63d Troop Carrier Wing, 1 July 1964 – 8 January 1966
- Pacific Air Forces, 13 February 1968 (not organized)
- Seventh Air Force, 1 March 1968
- 432d Tactical Reconnaissance Wing, 31 October 1968 (attached to Seventh Air Force)
- 388th Tactical Fighter Wing, 30 April 1972 (attached to Seventh Air Force to 15 August 1973, U.S. Support Activities Group/Seventh Air Force to c. 21 May 1974)
- 374th Tactical Airlift Wing, 22 May 1974 (attached to Thirteenth Air Force)
- 3d Tactical Fighter Wing, 31 March 1975 (attached to Thirteenth Air Force)
- 507th Tactical Air Control Group, 14 August 1975
- 552d Airborne Warning and Control Wing (later 552d Airborne Warning and Control Division), 1 October 1976
- 28th Air Division, 1 April 1985 (attached to Air Division Provisional, 15, 5 December 1990 – c. 16 March 1991)
- 552d Operations Group, 29 May 1992
- 55th Operations Group, 19 July 1994 – 1 October 1998
- Air Combat Command to activate or inactivate any time after 19 March 2008

379th Air Expeditionary Wing, 27 March 2008 – present

=== Stations ===
- Seattle Airport, Washington, 24 March 1942
- Gore Field, Montana, 22 June 1942 – 1 April 1944
- Syracuse Army Air Base, New York, 1 May 1944
- Baer Field, Indiana, 7–27 October 1944
- Mokmer Airfield, Biak, Netherlands East Indies, 11 November 1944
- Dulag Airfield, Leyte, Philippine Islands, May 1945
- Okinawa, 19 August 1945
- Yokota Air Base, Japan, 22 September 1945 – 15 January 1946
- Robins Air Force Base, Georgia, 19 October 1954 – 8 January 1966
- Da Nang Air Base, South Vietnam, 1 March 1968 (operated from Udorn Royal Thai Air Force Base, Thailand)
- Udorn Royal Thai Air Force Base, Thailand, 31 October 1968
- Korat Royal Thai Air Force Base, Thailand, 15 April 1972
- Clark Air Base, Philippines, 22 May 1974 – 14 August 1975
- Keesler Air Force Base, Mississippi 14 August 1975 – 18 July 1994

Deployed at Sharjah, United Arab Emirates, 1–25 September 1991
Deployed at Riyadh, Saudi Arabia, 25 September 1990–16 March 1991
Deployed at Aviano AB Italy, Support Bosina. 12 April 1993-18 July 1994

- Offutt Air Force Base, Nebraska, 19 July 1994 – 1 October 1998
- Al Udeid Air Base, Qatar, 27 March 2008 – present

=== Aircraft ===
- Douglas C-47 Skytrain (1944–1945)
- Curtiss C-46 Commando (1944–1945)
- Douglas C-124 Globemaster II (1954–1966)
- Lockheed EC-130E ABCCC (1968–1994)
- Boeing EC-135 (1994–1998)
- Boeing E-8 Joint STARS (2008–2023)

=== Operations ===
- World War II
- Vietnam War
- Operation Urgent Fury
- Operation Just Cause
- Operation Desert Storm
- Operation Deny Flight
- Operation Deliberate Force
- Operation Decisive Endeavor
- Operation Uphold Democracy
- Operation Iraqi Freedom
- Operation Enduring Freedom

== See also ==
- Organization of United States Air Force Units in the Gulf War
