= Gulf War order of battle: United States Air Force =

Gulf War order of battle

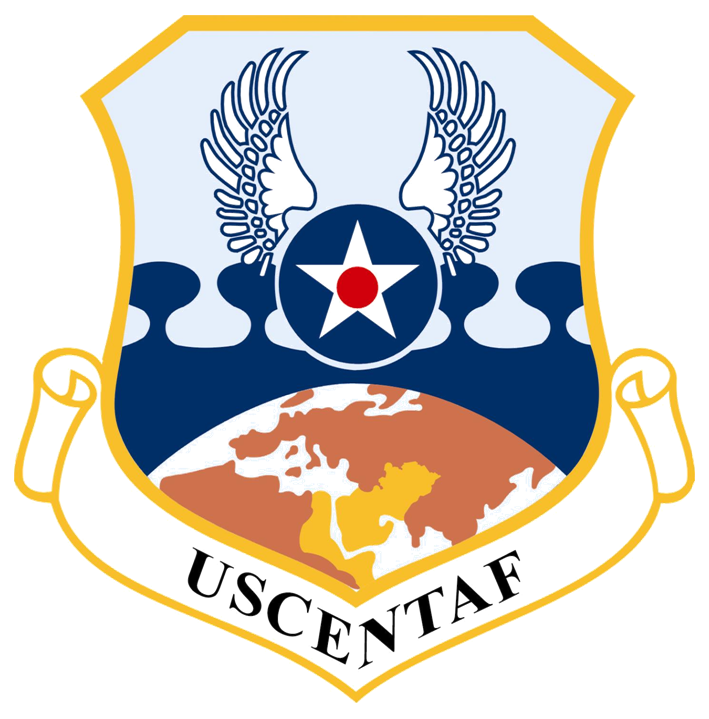
Emblem of the United States Central Command Air Forces, 1990

The 1990–1991 Gulf War was the last major United States Air Force combat operation of the 20th Century. The command and control of allied forces deployed to the Middle East initially as part of Operation Desert Shield, later engaging in combat operations during Operation Desert Storm, were assigned to United States Central Command Air Forces (USCENTAF), the USAF component of the Joint United States Central Command.

United States Air Force units were initially deployed to Saudi Arabia in August 1990, being assigned directly to CENTAF with a mission to defend the kingdom. In November 1990, the decision was made to enhance the force into an offensive-capable one, and additional units were ordered deployed to CENTAF. As a result, CENTAF set up a table of organization which established provisional Air Divisions to prevent too many units reporting directly to CENTAF headquarters. These were as follows:

- The 14th Air Division (Provisional) commanded deployed primarily Tactical Air Command and United States Air Forces in Europe units with the mission of destroying enemy air, missile and ground forces, as well as enemy infrastructure targets. To accomplish this mission, the 14th-controlled A-10 Thunderbolt II ground attack aircraft; F-15C Eagle and F-16 Fighting Falcon fighters; F-111 light tactical bombers; EF-111 Raven electronic combat aircraft and the F-117 stealth attack aircraft. The division also provided electronic warfare, reconnaissance, and in-theater attached Strategic Air Command refueling support.
- The 15th Air Division (Provisional) commanded deployed Tactical Air Command units with a reconnaissance and electronic warfare mission focused on defeating enemy ground base air defenses and increasing the effectiveness of friendly formations. Aircraft deployed included RF-4C Phantom II tactical reconnaissance; F-4G Phantom II anti-radar; EC-130H Compass Call electronic warfare and two prototype E-8A Joint Stars battle management and control, and E-3 Sentry AWACS Airborne Warning And Control System aircraft.
- The 1610th Airlift Division (Provisional) controlled Military Airlift Command C-130E/H Hercules theater airlift, aeromedical evacuation and Air Force Special Operations Command forces. Strategic Air Command deployed strategic electronic warfare and reconnaissance units also attached.
- The 17th Air Division (Provisional) commanded primarily provisional air refueling wings created from active-duty KC-135/KC-10 units of the Strategic Air Command's Fifteenth Air Force and SAC Air National Guard KC-135 units deployed within the CENTAF AOR.
- The SAC 7th Air Division commanded deployed Air Refueling and B-52 Stratofortress Bombardment Wings located outside of the CENTAF AOR.
- The 7440th Composite Wing was a United States Air Forces in Europe (USAFE) Provisional Wing under Joint Task Force Proven Force that flew combat missions over Northern and Central Iraq from Incirlik Air Base, Turkey.

== Aftermath ==
After the end of combat operations, most of the combat forces of CENTAF returned to their home stations. The provisional organizations established were inactivated; their temporary nature meaning that no official lineage or history was retained by the USAF. On 13 March 1991, Headquarters Tactical Air Command activated the 4404th Tactical Fighter Wing (Provisional) at Prince Sultan Air Base, Al Kharj, to replace the provisional Air Divisions. The original assets of the 4404th TFW came from the 4th TFW (Provisional), which had operated during the Gulf War.

The long-term effect of the deployment and organization of Air Force Wings and Groups to CENTAF for the Gulf War eventually led to an Air Force-Wide reorganization of its Cold War command structure; the result being the modern Air Force organization structure which exists today. Air Force Expeditionary units, which are activated and inactivated as needed to support deployments were developed, replacing the "Provisional" units of the Gulf War.

=== 14th Air Division (Provisional) ===
Brigadier General Buster Glosson served as commander, 14th Air Division (Provisional), and director of campaign plans for U.S. Central Command Air Forces, Riyadh, Saudi Arabia.

- 1st Tactical Fighter Wing (Provisional)

Deployed from Langley Air Force Base, Virginia
Headquarters: King Abdul Aziz Air Base, Dhahran, Saudi Arabia 26°15′55″N 50°09′07″E

Squadron	Tail Code	Aircraft Type	Notes
27th Tactical Fighter Squadron	FF	F-15C Eagle	Deployed: 8 August 1990 – 8 March 1991 (24 Aircraft)
71st Tactical Fighter Squadron	FF	F-15C Eagle	Deployed: 7 August 1990 – 8 March 1991 (24 Aircraft)

- 4th Tactical Fighter Wing (Provisional)

Deployed from Seymour Johnson Air Force Base, North Carolina
Headquarters: Prince Sultan Air Base, Al Kharj, Saudi Arabia 24°03′46″N 047°34′50″E

Squadron	Tail Code	Aircraft Type	Notes
335th Tactical Fighter Squadron	SJ	F-15E Strike Eagle	Deployed: 27 December 1990 – 24 June 1991 (24 Aircraft)
336th Tactical Fighter Squadron	SJ	F-15E Strike Eagle	Deployed: *18 December 1990 – 13 March 1991 (24 Aircraft)*Redeployed from Thumrait, Oman 8 Aug 1990 – 18 December 1990
53rd Tactical Fighter Squadron	BT	F-15C Eagle	Deployed: 20 December 1990 – 1 July 1991 (24 Aircraft) *from Bitburg AB, Germany with additional aircraft and personnel from the 22nd Tactical Fighter Squadron, also from Bitburg.
138th Tactical Fighter Squadron	NY	F-16A Fighting Falcon	Deployed from 174th Tactical Fighter Wing, Hancock Field, New York Air National Guard (16 Aircraft)
157th Tactical Fighter Squadron	SC	F-16A Fighting Falcon	Deployed from 169th Tactical Fighter Group, McEntire Air National Guard Base, South Carolina Air National Guard (24 Aircraft)

- 33d Tactical Fighter Wing (Provisional)

Deployed from Eglin Air Force Base, Florida
Headquarters: King Faisal Air Base, Tabuk, Saudi Arabia 28°22′16″N 036°36′50″E

Squadron	Tail Code	Aircraft Type	Notes
58th Tactical Fighter Squadron	EG	F-15C Eagle	Deployed: 28 August 1990 – 12 April 1991 (24 Aircraft)

- 37th Tactical Fighter Wing (Provisional)

Deployed from Tonopah Test Range Airport, Nevada
Headquarters: King Khalid Air Base, Khamis Mushait, Saudi Arabia 18°17′59″N 042°48′09″E

Squadron	Tail Code	Aircraft Type	Notes
415th Tactical Fighter Squadron	TR	F-117A Nighthawk	Deployed: 19 August 1990 – 1 April 1991 (18 Aircraft)
416th Tactical Fighter Squadron	TR	F-117A Nighthawk	Deployed: 19 August 1990 – 1 April 1991 (18 Aircraft)
417th Tactical Fighter Squadron	TR	F-117A Nighthawk	Deployed: 19 August 1990 – 1 April 1991 (6 Aircraft)

- 48th Tactical Fighter Wing (Provisional)

Deployed from RAF Lakenheath, England
Headquarters: Taif Air Base, Taif, Saudi Arabia 21°28′59″N 040°32′39″E

Squadron	Tail Code	Aircraft Type	Notes
492d Tactical Fighter Squadron	LN	F-111F	Deployed: 2 September 1990 – 15 March 1991 (22 Aircraft)
493d Tactical Fighter Squadron	LN	F-111F	Deployed: 2 September 1990 – 15 March 1991 (22 Aircraft)
494th Tactical Fighter Squadron	LN	F-111F	Deployed: 2 September 1990 – 15 March 1991 (22 Aircraft)
42d Electronic Combat Squadron	UH	EF-111	Deployed from 66th Electronic Combat Wing Sembach AB Germany & 20th Tactical Fighter Wing RAF Upper Heyford UK: 2 September 1990 – 15 March 1991 (5 Aircraft)
390th Electronic Combat Squadron	MO	EF-111	Deployed from 366th Tactical Fighter Wing, Mountain Home AFB, Idaho, 17 January 1991 – 6 March 1991 (5 Aircraft)

- 354th Tactical Fighter Wing (Provisional)

Deployed from Myrtle Beach Air Force Base, South Carolina
Headquarters: King Fahd International Airport, Dammam, Saudi Arabia 26°28′16″N 049°47′52″E

Squadron	Tail Code	Aircraft Type	Notes
353d Tactical Fighter Squadron	MB	A-10 Thunderbolt II	Deployed: 15 August 1990 – 25 March 1991 (24 Aircraft)
355th Tactical Fighter Squadron	MB	A-10 Thunderbolt II	Deployed: 15 August 1990 – 25 March 1991 (24 Aircraft)
74th Tactical Fighter Squadron	EL	A-10 Thunderbolt II	Deployed from 23d Tactical Fighter Wing, England AFB, Louisiana, 29 August 1990 – 20 April 1991 (24 Aircraft)
76th Tactical Fighter Squadron	EL	A-10 Thunderbolt II	Deployed from 23d Tactical Fighter Wing, England AFB, Louisiana, 29 August 1990 – 20 April 1991 (24 Aircraft)
23d Tactical Air Support Squadron	NF	OA-10 Thunderbolt II	Deployed from 355th Tactical Fighter Wing, Davis-Monthan AFB, Arizona, 29 August 1990 – 20 April 1991 (12 Aircraft)
511th Tactical Fighter Squadron	AR	A-10 Thunderbolt II	Deployed from 10th Tactical Fighter Wing, RAF Alconbury, England, 15 August 1990 – 25 March 1991 (24 Aircraft)
706th Tactical Fighter Squadron	NO	A-10 Thunderbolt II	Deployed from 926th Tactical Fighter Group, NAS New Orleans, United States Air Force Reserve, 15 August 1990 – 25 March 1991 (24 Aircraft)

- 363d Tactical Fighter Wing (Provisional)

Deployed from Shaw Air Force Base, South Carolina
Headquarters: Al Dhafra Air Base, Abu Dhabi, United Arab Emirates 24°14′53″N 054°32′51″E

Squadron	Tail Code	Aircraft Type	Notes
17th Tactical Fighter Squadron	SW	F-16C Fighting Falcon	Deployed: 9 August 1990 – 13 March 1991 (24 Aircraft)
33rd Tactical Fighter Squadron	SW	F-16C Fighting Falcon	Deployed: 9 August 1990 – 13 March 1991 (24 Aircraft)
10th Tactical Fighter Squadron	HR	F-16C Fighting Falcon	Deployed from 50th Tactical Fighter Wing, Hahn Air Base, Germany, 28 December 1990 – 10 May 1991 (24 Aircraft)
1705th Air Refueling Squadron (P)		KC-135 Stratotanker	Attached from SAC 7th Air Division. Composed of elements of the 11th (Altus), 306th (Altus), 905th (Grand Forks), 924th Air Refueling Squadrons (Castle). (15 Aircraft)

- 388th Tactical Fighter Wing (Provisional)

Deployed from Hill Air Force Base, Utah
Headquarters: Al Minhad Air Base, Dubai, United Arab Emirates 25°01′36.55″N 055°21′58.48″E

Squadron	Tail Code	Aircraft Type	Notes
4th Tactical Fighter Squadron	HL	F-16C Fighting Falcon	Deployed: 28 August 1990 – 27 March 1991
421st Tactical Fighter Squadron	HL	F-16C Fighting Falcon	Deployed: 28 August 1990 – 27 March 1991
69th Tactical Fighter Squadron	MY	F-16C Fighting Falcon	Deployed from 347th Tactical Fighter Wing, Moody Air Force Base, Georgia, 8–28 January 1991. Located at King Fahd International Airport, 29 January - 4 March 1991

- 401st Tactical Fighter Wing (Provisional)

Deployed from Torrejón Air Base, Spain
Headquarters: Doha International Airport, Qatar 25°15′40″N 051°33′54″E

Squadron	Tail Code	Aircraft Type	Notes
614th Tactical Fighter Squadron	TJ	F-16C Fighting Falcon	Deployed: 28 August 1990 – 27 March 1991 (24 Aircraft)

- 4410th Operational Support Wing (Provisional)

Deployed from Eglin AFB, Eglin Aux Fld#3, Florida
Headquarters: King Khalid Military City, Saudi Arabia 27°59′20″N 45°32′2″E

Squadron	Tail Code	Aircraft Type	Notes
728th Tactical Control Squadron		TPS-43E Tactical Radar	Deployed: 8 August 1990 – 17 April 1991 (440 Tons/280 PAX)

=== 15th Air Division (Provisional) ===
- 35th Tactical Fighter Wing (Provisional)

Deployed from George Air Force Base, California
Headquarters: Shaikh Isa Air Base, Bahrain

Squadron	Tail Code	Aircraft Type	Notes
561st Tactical Fighter Squadron	WW	F-4G Phantom II	Deployed: 16 August 1990-March 1991 (24 Aircraft)
81st Tactical Fighter Squadron	SP	F-4G Phantom II	Deployed from 52d Tactical Fighter Wing, Spangdahlem Air Base, Germany, 16 August 1990-March 1991 (24 Aircraft)
12th Tactical Reconnaissance Squadron	BA	RF-4C Phantom II	Deployed from 67th Tactical Reconnaissance Wing, Bergstrom Air Force Base, Texas, 14 January-10 May 1991 (6 Aircraft)
106th Tactical Reconnaissance Squadron	BH	RF-4C Phantom II	Deployed from 117th Tactical Reconnaissance Wing, Birmingham International Airport, Alabama Air National Guard (6 Aircraft)
192d Tactical Reconnaissance Squadron	RJ	RF-4C Phantom II	Deployed from 152d Reconnaissance Group, Reno-Tahoe International Airport, Nevada Air National Guard (6 Aircraft)

- 552d Airborne Warning and Control Wing (Provisional)

Deployed from Tinker Air Force Base, Oklahoma
Headquarters: King Khalid Air Base, Khamis Mushait, Saudi Arabia

Squadron	Tail Code	Aircraft Type	Notes
7th Airborne Command and Control Squadron		E-3 Sentry	Deployed: 17 January 1991 – 28 February 1991

- 41st Electronic Combat Squadron (Provisional)

Deployed from Davis-Monthan Air Force Base, Arizona
Headquarters: Bateen Air Base, Abu Dhabi, United Arab Emirates 24°25′42″N 054°27′19″E
EC-130H Compass Call (Tail Code: DM), 27 August 1990 – 17 April 1991

- 4411th Joint Stars Squadron

Headquarters: King Khalid Air Base, Khamis Mushait, Saudi Arabia
E-8A Joint Stars, December 1990-March 1991 (2 Aircraft)

=== 1610th Airlift Division (Provisional) ===
- 314th Tactical Airlift Wing (Provisional)

Deployed from Little Rock Air Force Base, Arkansas
Headquarters: Al Bateen Air Base, Abu Dhabi, United Arab Emirates

Squadron	Tail Code	Aircraft Type	Notes
50th Tactical Airlift Squadron	LR	C-130E Hercules	Deployed 14 August 1990 – 12 May 1991

- 317th Tactical Airlift Wing (Provisional)

Deployed from Pope Air Force Base, North Carolina
Headquarters: RAFO Thumrait, Oman 17°39′57″N 054°01′28″E

Squadron	Tail Code	Aircraft Type	Notes
1681st Tactical Airlift Squadron (P)	PB	C-130E Hercules.	16 Aircraft Composed of elements of the 39th, 40th and 41st Tactical Airlift Squadrons
1682d Tactical Airlift Squadron (P)	PB	C-130E Hercules	16 Aircraft Composed of elements of the 39th, 40th and 41st Tactical Airlift Squadrons

- 435th Tactical Airlift Wing (Provisional)

Deployed from Rhein-Main Air Base, Germany
Headquarters: Al Ain International Airport, Al Ain, United Arab Emirates 24°15′41.0″N 55°36′32.7″E

Squadron	Tail Code	Aircraft Type	Notes
37th Tactical Airlift Squadron		C-130E Hercules	Deployed: 15 August 1990 – 20 March 1991
1630th Tactical Airlift Squadron (P)		C-130E Hercules	8 Aircraft Composed of elements of West Virginia ANG 130th Tactical Airlift Squadron (4 aircraft) and 4 aircraft of Texas ANG 181st Tactical Airlift Squadron. Deployed: October 1990-24 June 1991
1632d Tactical Airlift Squadron (P)		C-130H Hercules	8 aircraft Composed of elements of Missouri ANG 180th Tactical Airlift Squadron. Deployed: 28 December 1990 – 24 June 1991

- 1640th Tactical Airlift Wing (Provisional)

Detached from Headquarters Military Airlift Command, Scott AFB, Illinois
Headquarters: Masirah Air Base, Oman 20°40′31″N 058°53′25″E

Squadron	Tail Code	Aircraft Type	Notes
1640th Tactical Airlift Squadron (P)	PB	C-130E Hercules	Composed of elements of the 317th Tactical Airlift Wing, Pope AFB, North Carolina. Deployed: 15 August 1990 – 20 March 1991
1707th Air Refueling Squadron (P)		KC-135 Stratotanker	Attached from SAC 7th Air Division. Composed of elements of the 901st, 905th, 919th Air Refueling Squadrons. (15 Aircraft)

- 1650th Tactical Airlift Wing (Provisional)

Detached from Headquarters Military Airlift Command, Scott AFB, Illinois
Headquarters: Sharjah International Airport, Sharjah, United Arab Emirates 25°19′43″N 055°31′02″E

Squadron	Tail Code	Aircraft Type	Notes
1650th Tactical Airlift Squadron (P)		C-130E Hercules	Apparently included "all aircraft and numerous aircrews and support personnel" from 914th Tactical Airlift Group, Niagara Falls International Airport, NY (AFRES) (source 914 AW article)
1611th Aeromedical Evacuation Squadron (P)		C-130E Hercules	Composed of elements of the 1st Aeromedical Evacuation Squadron, Pope AFB, North Carolina and 2d Aeromedical Evacuation Squadron, Rhein Main AB, Germany

- 1670th Tactical Airlift Group (Provisional)

Detached from Headquarters Military Airlift Command, Scott AFB, Illinois
Headquarters: Prince Sultan Air Base, Al Kharj, Saudi Arabia

Squadron	Tail Code	Aircraft Type	Notes
1670th Tactical Airlift Squadron (P)		C-130H Hercules	Composed of elements of the 773d Tactical Airlift Squadron, 463d Tactical Airlift Wing, Dyess AFB, Texas (4 Aircraft)
1671st Tactical Airlift Squadron (P)		C-130H Hercules	Composed of elements of the 772d Tactical Airlift Squadron, 463d Tactical Airlift Wing, Dyess AFB, Texas (4 Aircraft)

- Air Force Special Operations Command (Provisional)

Detached from Headquarters AFSOC, Hurlburt Field, Florida
Headquarters: King Fahd International Airport, Dammam, Saudi Arabia

Squadron	Aircraft Type	Notes
719th Special Operations Squadron	AC-130A Spectre Gunship	Deployed from 919th SOG, Duke Field, Florida
16th Special Operations Squadron	AC-130H Spectre Gunship	Deployed from 1st SOW, Hurlburt Field, Florida
850th Special Operations Squadron	MC/EC-130 Hercules; MH-53J	Composed of elements from 1st SOW, Hurlburt Field, Florida; 919th SOG, Duke Field, Florida, 193d SOG, Harrisburg International Airport, Pennsylvania Air National Guard
1675th Tactical Airlift Squadron (P)	C-130 Hercules	
160th Special Operations Aviation Regiment (Airborne)	MH-60, MH-47	United States Army unit, located at King Khalid International Airport

- 1612th Military Airlift Squadron (Provisional)

Detached from Headquarters Military Airlift Command, Scott AFB, Illinois
Headquarters: King Khalid Air Base, Khamis Mushait, Saudi Arabia
C-21 Learjet, (8 Aircraft)
C-12 Huron (7 Aircraft)
RU-21 Learjet (7 Aircraft)

Provided Special Air Mission transport for CENTAF/CENTCOM leadership and civilian VIPs from coalition nations and the United States.

=== 17th Air Division (Provisional) ===
- 1700th Strategic Wing (Provisional)

Detached from Headquarters 7th Air Division, Strategic Air Command, Ramstein AB, Germany
Headquarters: King Khalid Air Base, Khamis Mushait, Saudi Arabia

Squadron	Aircraft Type	Notes
1700th Strategic Reconnaissance Squadron (P)	RC-135	Deployed from the 55th Strategic Reconnaissance Wing, Offutt AFB, Nebraska (4 Aircraft)
1704th Strategic Reconnaissance Squadron (P)	U2/TR-1	Deployed from the 9th Reconnaissance Wing, Beale AFB, Ca and 95th Reconnaissance Squadron, 17th Reconnaissance Wing, RAF Alconbury, UK. On 21 September 1990 Operating Location-Crested Harvest (OL-CH, often known to USAF personnel as "Camel Hump") was designated the 1704th Reconnaissance Squadron (Provisional).
1700th Air Refueling Squadron (P)	KC-135 Stratotanker	10 Aircraft Assigned
69th Bombardment Squadron (P)	B-52G Stratofortresses	Deployed from 42d Bombardment Wing, Loring AFB, Maine (7 Aircraft)

- 1701st Air Refueling Wing (Provisional)

Headquarters: King Abdul Aziz Air Base, Jeddah, Saudi Arabia

Squadron	Aircraft Type	Notes
1709th Air Refueling Squadron (P)	KC-135E/A Stratotanker	Deployed from 336th Air Refueling Squadron, 452d Air Refueling Wing, March AFB, California (6 Aircraft, 31 December 1990, 5 January 1991-March 1991); Deployed from 68th Air Refueling Wing, Seymour Johnson AFB, North Carolina, (3 Aircraft, 31 December 1990-March 1991); Deployed from 72d Air Refueling Squadron, 434th Air Refueling Wing, Grissom AFB, Indiana (4 Aircraft, 5 January 1991-March 1991)
1710th Air Refueling Squadron (P)	KC-10 Extender	Deployed from 336th Air Refueling Squadron, 452d Air Refueling Wing, March AFB, California (6 Aircraft, 31 December 1990, 5 January 1991-March 1991); Deployed from 68th Air Refueling Wing, Seymour Johnson AFB, North Carolina, (3 Aircraft, 31 December 1990-March 1991)

- 1701st Strategic Wing (Provisional)

Headquarters: King Abdul Aziz Air Base, Jeddah, Saudi Arabia 21°40′46″N 039°09′24″E

Squadron	Aircraft Type	Notes
807th Air Refueling Squadron (P)	KC-135R Stratotanker	Deployed from 90th Air Refueling Squadron, 19th Air Refueling Wing, Robins AFB, Georgia (16 Aircraft, 11 August 1990-March 1991)

- 1702d Air Refueling Wing (Provisional)

Headquarters: Seeb International Airport, Muscat, Oman. 23°35′36″N 58°17′04″E

Squadron	Aircraft Type	Notes
1702d Air Refueling Squadron (P)	KC-135R Stratotanker	Deployed from 41st Air Refueling Squadron, 416th Bombardment Wing, Griffiss AFB, New York (1 Aircraft, 28 August 1990) Deployed from 301st Air Refueling Squadron, 301st Air Refueling Wing, Malmstrom AFB, Montana (1 Aircraft, 29 August 1990); Deployed from 905th Air Refueling Squadron, 319th Bombardment Wing, Grand Forks AFB, North Dakota (3 Aircraft, 28 August 1990) - March 1991

- 1706th Air Refueling Wing (Provisional)

Headquarters: Cairo West Airport, Egypt 30°06′59″N 30°54′55″E

Squadron	Aircraft Type	Notes
1706th Air Refueling Squadron (P)	KC-135R Stratotanker	Deployed from 905th Air Refueling Squadron, 319th Bombardment Wing, Grand Forks AFB, North Dakota, 28 September 1990 - March 1991 (3 Aircraft); Deployed from 9th Strategic Reconnaissance Wing, Beale AFB, California, 9 October 1990 - March 1991
	KC-135E Stratotanker	Deployed from 126th Air Refueling Squadron, 128th Air Refueling Wing, General Mitchell ANGB, Wisconsin Air National Guard, 30 December 1990 - March 1991 (10 Aircraft); Deployed from 116th Air Refueling Squadron, 141st Air Refueling Wing, Fairchild AFB, Washington Air National Guard, 30 December 1990 - March 1991 (5 Aircraft)

The National Air and Space Museum writes that Colonel Eugene A. Schmitz was Commander, 128th Air Refueling Wing (ANG), Milwaukee, WI from JANUARY, 1987 to JANUARY, 1997, and also served as Vice Commander and Commander, 1706th Air Refueling Wing (Provisional) Cairo, Egypt, DESERT STORM, from 27 DECEMBER 1990 to 15 April 1991.

- 1708th Bombardment Wing (Provisional)

Headquarters: King Abdul Aziz Air Base, Jeddah, Saudi Arabia
20 B-52G Stratofortresses. The lead unit within the 1708th BW (P) was the 524th BS/379th BW from Wurtsmith AFB, Michigan. Aircraft and crews were also drawn from the 62d and 596th BS/2d BW Barksdale AFB, Louisiana; 69th BS/42d BW at Loring AFB, Maine; 328th BS/93d BW, Castle AFB, California, and the 668th BS/416 BW at Griffiss AFB, New York. B-52 operations at Jeddah were not possible prior to the initiation of combat so the wing gained its aircraft when the conflict began. Six aircraft from the 42d BW were moved to Jeddah from Diego Garcia on 17 January, and 10 more flew in from Wurthsmith, attacking targets en route. Although launched from Wurtsmith and flown by 379th BW crews, three of the aircraft came from the 93d BW at Castle and two from the 42d BW at Loring.

Squadron	Aircraft Type	Notes
	B-52G Stratofortress	Deployed from 524th BS/379th BW (5 Aircraft); 668th BS/416 BW (3 Aircraft); 596th BS/2d BW (1 Aircraft)
	B-52G Stratofortress	Deployed from 69th BS/42d BW (5 Aircraft); 328th BS/93d BW (3 Aircraft); 668th BS/416 BW (3 Aircraft)

- 1709th Air Refueling Wing (Provisional)

Headquarters: King Abdul Aziz Air Base, Jeddah, Saudi Arabia

Squadron	Aircraft Type	Notes
	KC-135A/E Stratotanker	Composed of 13 Air National Guard tanker unit elements. First tankers to arrive at Jeddah in August 1990-March 1991 (76 Aircraft); Known units that deployed aircraft were: 101st Air Refueling Wing, Bangor Air National Guard Base, Maine Air National Guard; 126th Air Refueling Wing, O'Hare Air National Guard Base, Illinois Air National Guard; 128th Air Refueling Group, General Mitchell International Airport, Wisconsin Air National Guard; 134th Air Refueling Group, McGhee Tyson Air National Guard Base, Tennessee Air National Guard; 141st Air Refueling Group, Fairchild Air Force Base, Washington Air National Guard; 151st Air Refueling Group, Salt Lake City International Airport, Utah Air National Guard; 157th Air Refueling Group, Pease Air Force Base, New Hampshire Air National Guard; 160th Air Refueling Group, Rickenbacker Air National Guard Base, Ohio Air National Guard; 161st Air Refueling Group, Sky Harbor International Airport, Arizona Air National Guard; 170th Air Refueling Group, McGuire Air Force Base, New Jersey Air National Guard; 171st Air Refueling Wing, Pittsburgh Air National Guard Base, Pennsylvania Air National Guard; 190th Air Refueling Group, Forbes Air National Guard Base, Kansas Air National Guard

- 1712th Air Refueling Wing (Provisional)

Headquarters: Al Banteen Air Base, Abu Dhabi, United Arab Emirates

Squadron	Aircraft Type	Notes
1712th Air Refueling Squadron (P)	KC-135E Stratotanker	Deployed from 126th Air Refueling Wing, O'Hare Air National Guard Base, Illinois Air National Guard. Deployed 19 December 1990-March 1991

- 1713th Air Refueling Wing (Provisional)

Headquarters: Al Banteen Air Base, Abu Dhabi, United Arab Emirates

Squadron	Aircraft Type	Notes
1713th Air Refueling Squadron (P)	KC-135E Stratotanker	Deployed from 134th Air Refueling Wing, McGhee Tyson Air National Guard Base, Tennessee Air National Guard, 19 December 1990 - March 1991

=== 7th Air Division ===
- 801st Air Refueling Wing (Provisional)

Headquarters: Morón Air Base, Spain 37°10′29″N 05°36′57″W

Squadron	Aircraft Type	Notes
801st Air Refueling Squadron (P)	KC-135 Stratotanker	Deployed from 2d Bombardment Wing, Barksdale AFB, Louisiana (15 Aircraft) August 1990-March 1991

- 801st Bombardment Wing (Provisional)

Headquarters: Morón Air Base, Spain
The 801st BW (P) consisted of 28 B-52G Stratofortresses and was formed around a nucleus provided by he 2d Bombardment Wing at Barksdale AFB, Louisiana and drew aircraft from the crews of the 524th BS/379th BW, Wurtsmith AFB, Michigan; the 668th BS/416th BW at Griffiss AFB, New York and from 69th BS/42d BW at Loring AFB, Maine. One B-52G (52-6503) was sent from the 340th BS/97th BW at Eaker AFB, Arkansas.

Squadron	Aircraft Type	Notes
801st Bombardment Squadron (P)	B-52G Stratofortress	Deployed from 2d BW (7 Aircraft); 69th BS/42d BW (2 Aircraft); 668th BS/416th BW (8 Aircraft) January–March 1991
802d Bombardment Squadron (P)	B-52G Stratofortress	Deployed from 524th BS/379th BW (8 Aircraft); 340th BS/97th BW (1 Aircraft); 524th BS/379th BW (8 Aircraft) January–March 1991

- 802d Air Refueling Wing (Provisional)

Headquarters: Lajes Field, Azores, Portugal 38°45′42″N 027°05′26″W

Squadron	Aircraft Type	Notes
802d Air Refueling Squadron (P)	KC-135 Stratotanker; KC-10 Extender	Composed of flights (August 1990-March 1991) from: 97th Bombardment Wing, Eaker AFB, Arkansas (KC-135); 2d Bombardment Wing, Barksdale AFB, Louisiana (KC-135) (KC-10); 92d Bombardment Wing, Fairchild AFB, Washington (KC-135); 7th Bombardment Wing, Carswell AFB, Texas (KC-135)

- 804th Air Refueling Wing (Provisional)

Headquarters: Incirlik Air Base, Turkey 37°00′07″N 035°25′33″E

Squadron	Aircraft Type	Notes
804th Air Refueling Squadron (P)	KC-135 Stratotanker	August 1990-March 1991

- 806th Bombardment Wing (Provisional)

Headquarters: RAF Fairford, England 51°40′56″N 001°47′24″W
The 806th BW (P) was formed around a cadre of air and ground crews provided by the 97th Bombardment Wing, Eaker AFB, Arkansas. It consisted of a total of 11 B-52G Stratofortresses, also being drawn from the 668th BS/416th BW at Griffiss AFB, New York; 596th BS/2d BW, Barksdale AFB, Louisiana, and the 328th BS/93d BW at Castle AFB, California.

Squadron	Aircraft Type	Notes
806th Bombardment Squadron	B-52G Stratofortress	97th BW (6 Aircraft); 596th BS/2d BW (2 Aircraft); 668th BS/416th BW (2 Aircraft); 328th BS/93d BW (1 Aircraft) January–March 1991

- 807th Air Refueling Wing (Provisional)

Headquarters: Incirlik Air Base, Turkey

Squadron	Aircraft Type	Notes
807th Air Refueling Squadron (P)	KC-135 Stratotanker	August 1990-March 1991

- 810th Air Refueling Wing (Provisional)

Headquarters: Incirlik Air Base, Turkey

Squadron	Aircraft Type	Notes
810th Air Refueling Squadron (P)	KC-135 Stratotanker	August 1990-March 1991

- 4300th Bombardment Wing (Provisional)

Headquarters: Diego Garcia, British Indian Ocean Territory [BIOT] 7°18′48″S 72°24′40″E
The wing was activated at Diego Garcia and attached to 15th Air Force on 24 August 1990. The lead unit for the wing was the 69th BS/42d BW from Loring AFB, Maine. Aircraft were also drawn from the 328th BS/93d BW at Castle AFB, California. Six aircraft were transferred to Jeddah, Saudi Arabia on 17 January 1991 and they were replaced by six B-52Gs from the 1500th SW (P) at Andersen AFB, Guam.

Squadron	Aircraft Type	Notes
4300th Bombardment Squadron (P)	B-52G Stratofortress	Composed of 69th BS/42d BW (16 Aircraft); 328th BS/93d BW (16 Aircraft)

== See also ==
- List of MAJCOM wings of the United States Air Force
- List of USAF Provisional Wings assigned to Strategic Air Command
