= Buster Glosson =

United States Air Force general

Buster C. Glosson
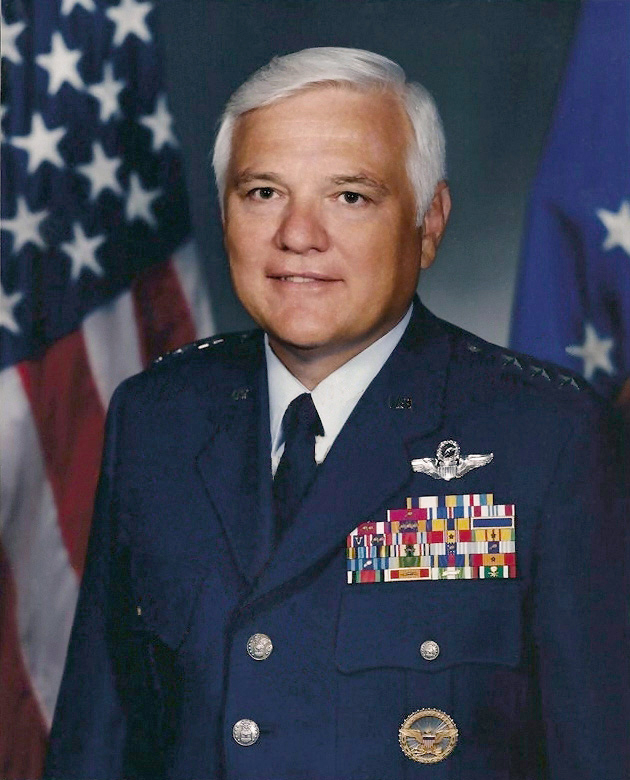
- Lieutenant General Buster Glosson
- Born: March 14, 1942 (age 84); Greensboro, North Carolina, U.S.
- Military career
- Allegiance: United States of America
- Branch: United States Air Force
- Service years: 1965–1994
- Rank: Lieutenant General
- Commands: 1st Tactical Fighter Wing
- Conflicts: Vietnam War; Operation Desert Storm
- Awards: Legion of Merit (3); Distinguished Flying Cross; Air Medal (4)

Lieutenant General Buster Cleveland Glosson (born March 14, 1942) was the deputy chief of staff for plans and operations at the headquarters of the United States Air Force (USAF) in Washington D.C. He was responsible to the secretary of the Air Force and chief of staff for the planning, operations, requirements and force structure necessary to support military operations. As the USAF operations deputy to the Joint Chiefs of Staff, he determined operational requirements, concepts, doctrine, strategy, training and the assets necessary to support national security objectives and military strategy.

== Education ==
He received his Bachelor of Science degree in electrical engineering from North Carolina State University in 1965. He attended the Armed Forces Staff College in Norfolk, Virginia, in 1977 and the National War College at Fort Lesley J. McNair, Washington, D.C., in 1981.

== Career ==
Glosson entered the USAF in 1965 as a distinguished graduate of the North Carolina State University Reserve Officer Training Corps program. He flew combat missions as a flight commander in both North and South Vietnam. He commanded the 414th Fighter Weapons Squadron and two tactical fighter wings. During the Gulf War, he commanded the 14th Air Division (Provisional) and was director of campaign plans for U.S. Central Command Air Forces (USCENTAF), Riyadh, Saudi Arabia. In this function, he was responsible for planning the bombardment of Baghdad on January 17, 1991, that resulted in the near total destruction of the Iraqi command and control structure within the first hours of the air campaign. The Amiriyah shelter bombing on February 13 that year, that killed over 400 Iraqi civilians, was also carried out under his responsibility.

He is a command pilot with more than 3,600 flying hours primarily in the F-4, F-15C and F-15E.

Glosson retired on July 1, 1994. Following his retirement, Glosson wrote a book titled War with Iraq: Critical Lessons about the Gulf War and the lessons he drew from the events and outcome of the conflict.

== Assignments ==
- March 1965 – July 1966, student, pilot training, Moody Air Force Base, Georgia
- July 1966 – December 1967, instructor pilot, T-38, 3500th Pilot Training Squadron, Air Training Command, Reese Air Force Base, Texas
- December 1967 – September 1971, T-38 instructor, academic instructor and flight examiner; assistant operations officer, then operations officer, 3250th Fighter Training Squadron, Air Training Command, Tyndall Air Force Base, Florida
- September 1971 – April 1972, student, USAF Operational Training Course, F-4, 4435th Tactical Fighter Squadron, Tactical Air Command, George Air Force Base, California
- April 1972 – September 1972, aircraft commander, F-4E, 4th Tactical Fighter Squadron, Pacific Air Forces, Takhli Royal Thai Air Force Base, Thailand
- September 1972 – April 1973, air operations officer, 366th Tactical Fighter Wing, Pacific Air Forces, Takhli Royal Thai Air Force Base, Thailand
- April 1973 – September 1974, chief, fighter and forward air controller, standardization and evaluation, Headquarters 13th Air Force, Pacific Air Forces, Clark Air Base, Philippines
- September 1974 – July 1977, executive officer to the director; special assistant to the director, legislative liaison, Washington, D.C.
- July 1977 – January 1978, student, Armed Forces Staff College, NDU, Norfolk, Virginia
- January 1978 – August 1978, student, USAF Operational Training Course, F-4D, 307th Tactical Fighter Squadron, Tactical Air Command, Homestead Air Force Base, Florida
- August 1978 – August 1979, chief, Standardization and Evaluation Division, 56th Tactical Fighter Wing, Tactical Air Command, MacDill Air Force Base, Florida
- August 1979 – June 1980, executive officer to the commander, USAF TFWC, TAC, Nellis Air Force Base, Nevada
- June 1980 – August 1980, chief, Standardization and Evaluation Division, 414th Fighter Weapons Squadron, Tactical Air Command, Nellis Air Force Base, Nevada
- August 1980 – July 1981, commander, 414th Fighter Weapons Squadron, TAC, Nellis Air Force Base, Nevada
- July 1981 – June 1982, student, National War College, Fort Lesley J. McNair, Washington, D.C.
- June 1982 – July 1983, chief, Tactical Forces Division, deputy director for forces, Headquarters U.S. Air Force, Washington, D.C.
- July 1983 – August 1984, chief, Programs Division, Deputy Director for Resources, Headquarters U.S. Air Force, Washington, D.C.
- August 1984 – July 1986, vice commander, then commander, 347th Tactical Fighter Wing, Tactical Air Command, Moody Air Force Base, Georgia
- July 1986 – June 1987, commander, 1st Tactical Fighter Wing, Headquarters Tactical Air Command, Langley Air Force Base, Virginia
- June 1987 – September 1988, deputy chief of staff, plans and programs, Headquarters U.S. Air Forces in Europe, Ramstein Air Base, West Germany
- September 1988 – July 1990, deputy assistant secretary of defense (legislative affairs), OSD, Washington, D.C.
- July 1990 – August 1990, deputy commander, Joint Task Force Middle East, USCENTCOM
- August 1990 – May 1991, CENTAF director of campaign plans, USCENTCOM, and commander, 14th AD (Provisional), Riyadh, Saudi Arabia
- May 1991 – May 1992, director, Legislative Liaison, and director, AF Issues Team, the Pentagon, Washington, D.C.
- June 1992 – 1994, deputy chief of staff for plans and operations, Washington, D.C.

== Flight information ==
Glosson is rated as a Command pilot with more than 3,600 flight hours having flown: F-4, F-5, F-15C, F-15E and T-38.

== Major awards and decorations ==
- Distinguished Service Medal
- Defense Superior Service Medal
- Legion of Merit with two oak leaf clusters
- Distinguished Flying Cross
- Defense Meritorious Service Medal
- Meritorious Service Medal with two oak leaf clusters
- Air Medal with three oak leaf clusters
- Air Force Commendation Medal
- Presidential Unit Citation
- Air Force Outstanding Unit Award with "V" device and two oak leaf clusters
- National Defense Service Medal with service star
- Vietnam Service Medal with service star
- Republic of Vietnam Gallantry Cross with Palm
- Republic of Vietnam Campaign Medal
- Kuwait Liberation Medal

== Publications ==
- "Impact of Precision Weapons on Air Combat Operations," Air Power Journal, Summer 1993.
- War with Iraq: Critical Lessons Glosson Family Foundation, 2003

== Promotion dates ==
- Second Lieutenant January 23, 1965
- First Lieutenant September 6, 1966
- Captain May 25, 1968
- Major August 1, 1976
- Lieutenant Colonel December 1, 1979
- Colonel October 1, 1982
- Brigadier General July 1, 1988
- Major General June 1, 1991
- Lieutenant General June 1, 1992
