= Rushmore Air Force Station =

Coordinates: 44°9′56″N 103°6′21″W

Rushmore Air Force Station, South Dakota, was a secure weapons administration, storage, and handling facility for atomic, and later thermonuclear weapons, located adjacent to Ellsworth Air Force Base on its north side, that was operational from 1950 to 1962. It was operated by Air Materiel Command, Armed Forces Special Weapons Project, and the Atomic Energy Commission (AEC). Sandia National Laboratories (SNL) was under contract to provide oversight and technical responsibility of the weapons housed at the AFS.

== History ==
The Sandia National Laboratories had overseen the construction by 1950 of four "Q Area" secure special weapons areas (so named for the clearance code on the access badges) which were the storage and main stockpiles for the 298 nuclear bombs in inventory by mid-1950. Sandia Base initiated construction of the Operational Storage Site (OSS), the physically smaller alert facilities of key strategic importance, in 1950. The first five of these installations were set up by Sandia immediately neighboring selected SAC bases. Site F was located at Ellsworth AFB, near Rapid City, South Dakota and named Rushmore Air Force Station. "Sandia transferred operation of the five alert sites bordering the SAC bases to Air Materiel Command after a shakedown period during which Sandia personnel worked at the sites with the Air Force and AEC. Air Materiel Command designated the sites depots, with associated Air Force personnel organied as aviation depot groups, and subsequently, Aviation Depot Squadrons." The 3081st Aviation Depot Group was assigned.

"The facilities comprising the Rushmore AFS were primarily associated with the maintenance and storage of atomic and thermonuclear weapons. Storage and maintenance activities were compartmentalized to specialized facilities for each stage of maintenance for security, safety, and quality assurance. Other facilities on Rushmore AFS were to support the administrative and security requirements for the secure facility including office space, unaccompanied housing, crew readiness and dining facilities, and communications. SNL and Department of Defense (DoD) personnel performed the maintenance and storage functions required by the weapons, including transporting the weapons to the flightline and loading them into the nuclear-capable bombers assigned to Ellsworth AFB. On 1July 1962, Rushmore AFS was absorbed Ellsworth AFB. By 1992, Ellsworth AFB was included in the newly created Air Combat Command (ACC) and the assigned B-1B bombers were adapted to a conventional mission."

== Current day ==
By 2009, the 28th Bomb Wing, the Ellsworth AFB host unit, began steps for the removal of eight empty or underutilized structures or those not considered mission-critical. "The unique construction and infrastructure included in the buildings would make it difficult to rehabilitate or renovate these buildings to another purpose. In addition, the Air Force has set a demolition goal in response to budget shortfalls to reduce the service-wide facility footprint by 20 percent between Fiscal Year (FY) 2008 and FY 2020. The demolition of these buildings would contribute to the overall Air Force demolition goal."

Proposed for removal are Bldg. 88030, Warehouse, Supply and Equipment Depot, built 1952; Bldg. 88036, Paint Shop, built 1961; Bldg. 88315, Inert Spares Storage/Base Spares Warehouse #1, built 1952; Bldg. 88316, Administration Office/Base Spares Office, built 1952; Bldg. 88319, Supply and Equipment Shed/Base Spares Warehouse #2, built 1952; Bldg. 88320, Crew Readiness/Handling Crew Building, stated as built in 1952, but does not appear on aerial photographs until 1954; Bldg. 88323, Inert Spares Warehouse #3/Heated Auto Storage, built 1956; and Bldg. 88327, Communications, stated as built in 1952, but does not appear on aerial photographs until 1954.

Both historical and environmental surveys have been made for this project.
