= 3rd Wing =

United States Air Force wing

3rd Wing

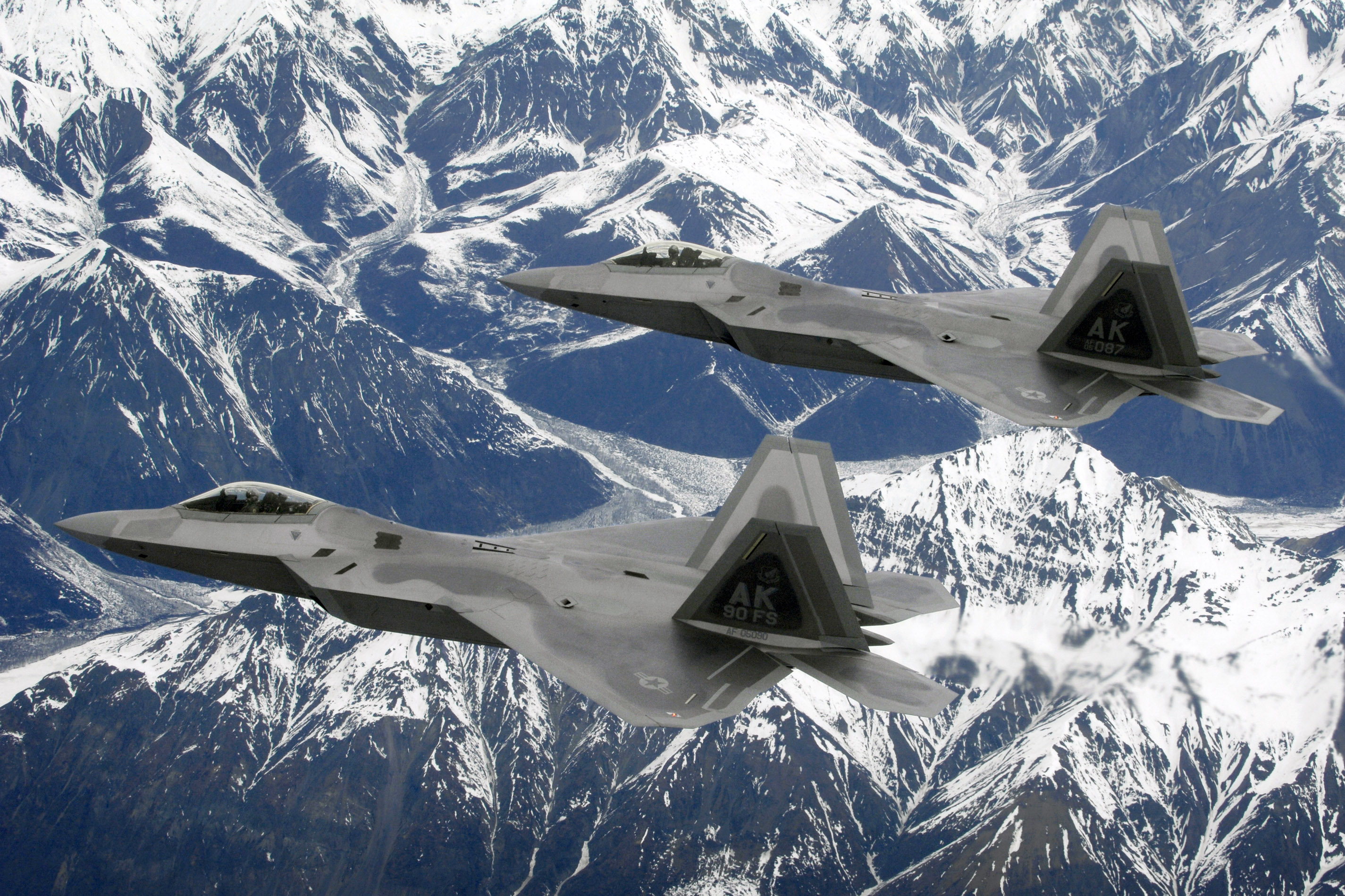
- Two of the wing's F-22 Raptors over Alaska, 2007
- Active: 18 August 1948 – present (78 years, 2 months)
- Country: United States
- Branch: United States Air Force
- Type: Composite Wing
- Part of: Pacific Air Forces: Eleventh Air Force
- Garrison/HQ: Elmendorf Air Force Base, Alaska
- Motto: Non Solum Armis (Latin for 'Not By Arms Alone')
- Engagements: Korean War; Vietnam War; Gulf War

- Decorations: Presidential Unit Citation (2x); Air Force Outstanding Unit Award with Combat "V" Device (3x); Air Force Outstanding Unit Award (12x); Republic of Korea Presidential Unit Citation; Republic of Vietnam Gallantry Cross with Palm

Commanders
- Current commander: Colonel David Deptula

Insignia
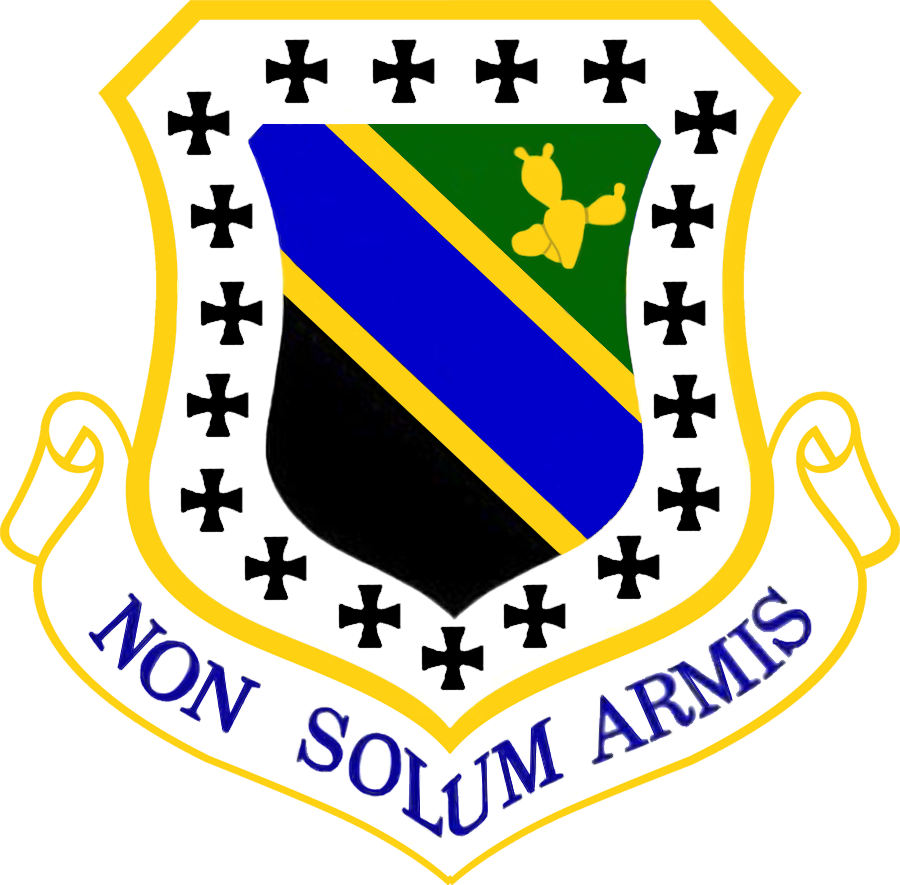
- 3rd Wing emblem (Note: Approved 22 December 1952. The wing's emblem, a variation of the emblem approved for the 3rd Operations Group in 1922, features the old United States Army Air Service colors with a prickly pear cactus commemorating the group's service patrolling the Mexican border. The 19 crosses pattée allude to victory credits earned by the group's squadrons during World War I.)

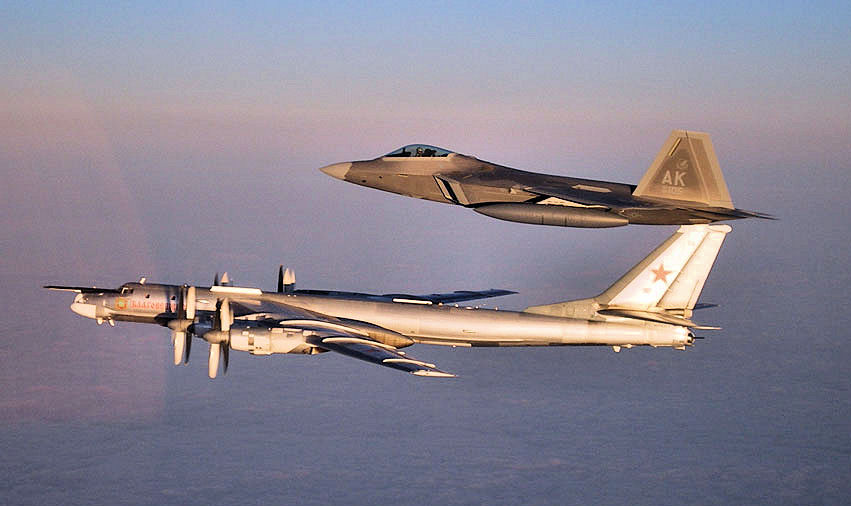
A 90th Fighter Squadron F-22 Raptor escorts a Russian Air Force Tu-95 Bear bomber near Nunivak Island

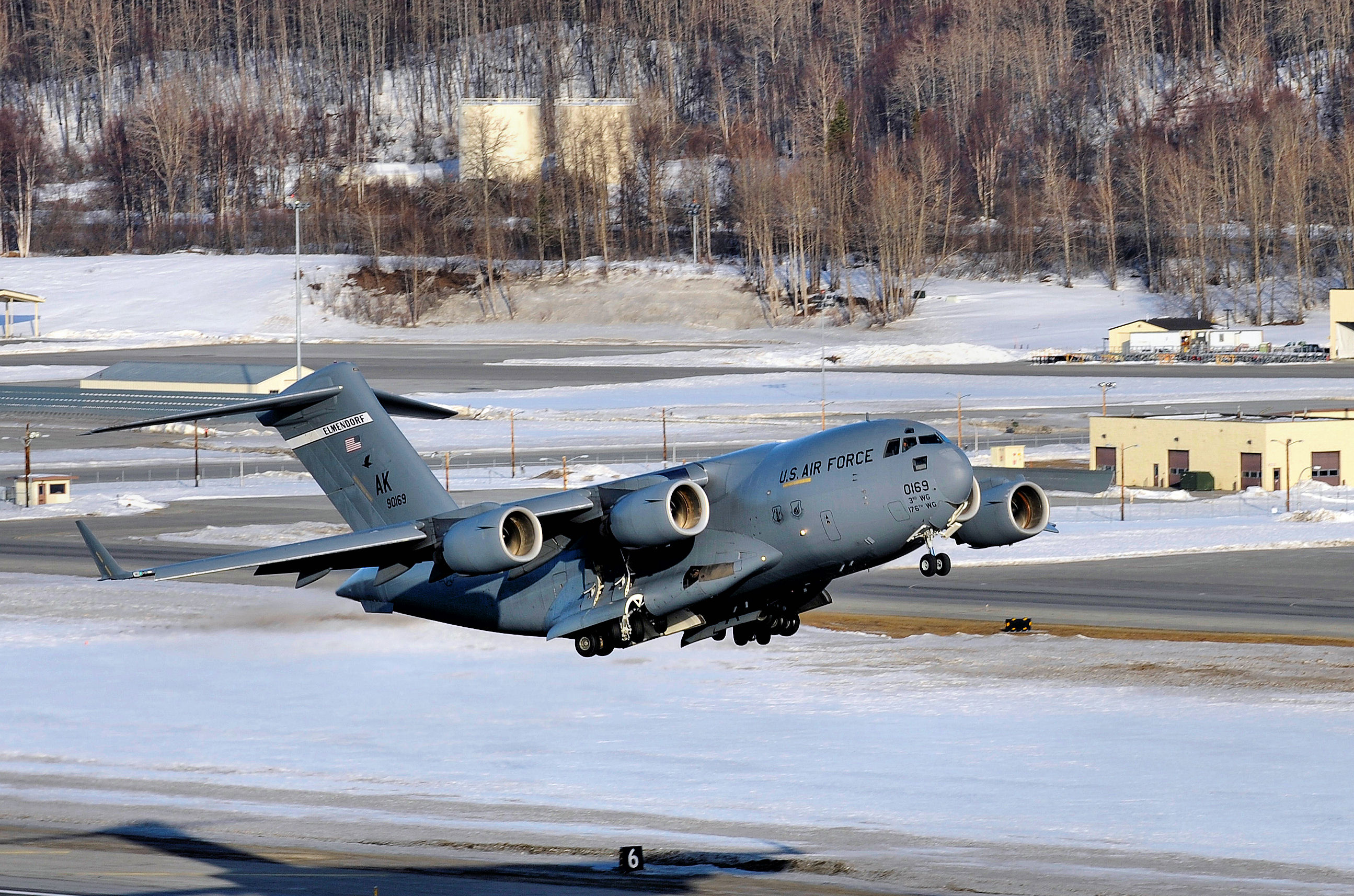
A 517th Airlift Squadron C-17 Globemaster III taking off from Elmendorf AFB

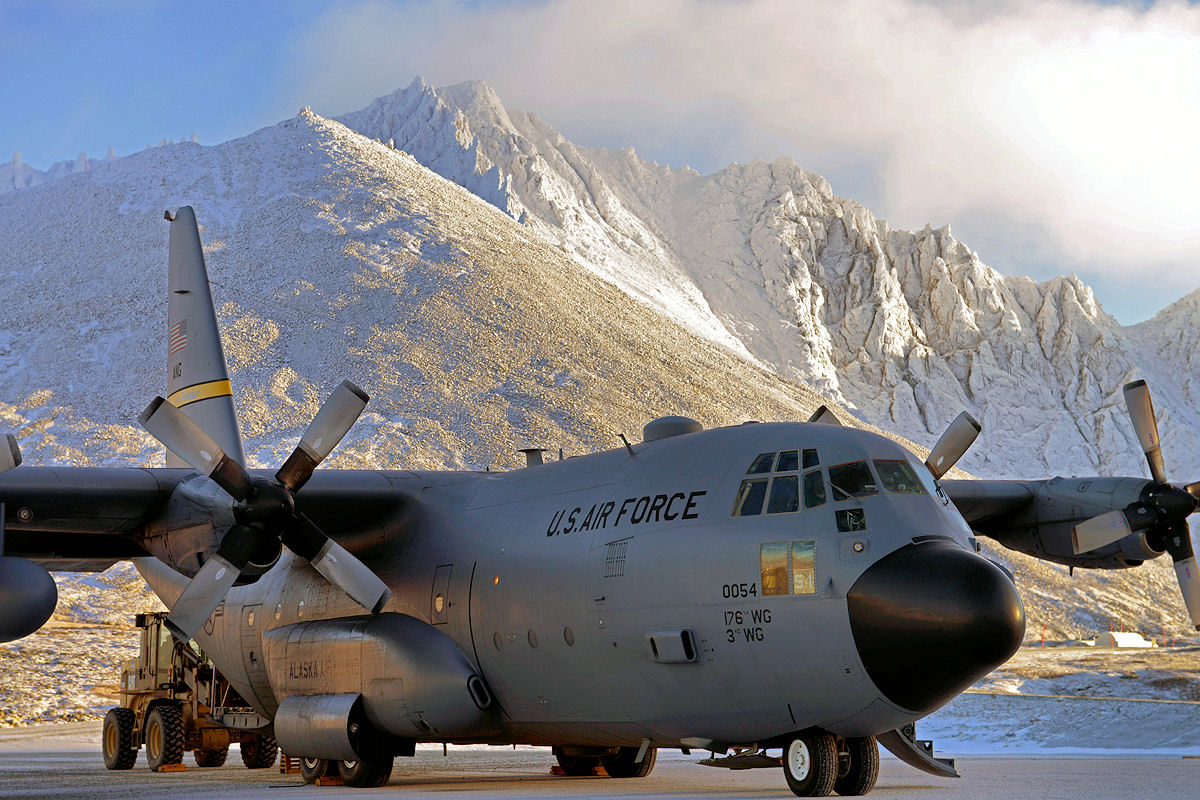
The 537th Airlift Squadron supported remote radar sites in Alaska with C-130 Hercules airlifters.

The 3rd Wing is a unit of the United States Air Force, assigned to the Pacific Air Forces Eleventh Air Force. It is stationed at Joint Base Elmendorf-Richardson, Alaska.

The Wing is the largest and principal unit within 11th Air Force. A composite organization, it provides air supremacy, surveillance, worldwide airlift, and agile combat support forces to project power and reach.

The wing's 3rd Operations Group is a direct descendant of the 3rd Attack Group, one of the 15 original combat air groups formed by the Army before World War II. The Wing performed reconnaissance and interdiction combat missions from Iwakuni Air Base, Japan, at the beginning of the Korean War.

During the Vietnam War, the wing moved in November 1965 to Bien Hoa Air Base, South Vietnam, a forward operating base, which frequently came under enemy mortar and rocket fire. Missions included close air support, counterinsurgency, forward air control, interdiction, and radar-controlled bombing. Supported numerous ground operations with strike missions against enemy fortifications, supply areas, lines of communication and personnel, in addition to suppressing fire in landing areas.

Today, the 3rd Wing trains and equips an Air Expeditionary Force lead wing composed of more than 6,000 Airmen and E-3G, C-17 and F-22A aircraft.

== Overview ==
The mission of the 3rd Wing is to support and defend U.S. interests in the Asia Pacific region and around the world by providing units who are ready for worldwide air power projection and a base that is capable of meeting United States Pacific Command's theater staging and throughput requirements.

The Wing is composed of two groups each with specific functions. The Operations Group controls all flying and airfield operations. The Maintenance Group performs Aircraft and Aircraft support equipment maintenance.

- 3rd Operations Group (Tail Code: AK)

3rd Operations Support Squadron
90th Fighter Squadron (F-22A)
517th Airlift Squadron (C-12, C-17)
525th Fighter Squadron (F-22A)
962nd Airborne Air Control Squadron (E-3G)

- 3rd Maintenance Group
- Wing Staff Agencies

== History ==
The wing was established as 3rd Bombardment Wing, Light on 10 August 1948. Activated on 18 August 1948 at Yokota Air Base, Japan. The 3rd Bombardment Group was assigned to the wing, which received the group's emblem and honors. The wing trained as a bombardment and reconnaissance wing as part of the army of occupation.

The 3rd Bomb Wing moved to Johnson Air Base, Japan, on 1 April 1950, where it trained in bombardment and reconnaissance. The training switched to night interdiction in June. On 25 June 1950, the Air Force redesignated the 8th, 13th and 90th as bombardment squadrons (light, night intruder). That same day, North Korea invaded South Korea during the early morning hours. President Harry Truman authorized the US Air Force and Navy to support the rapidly retreating South Koreans.

=== Korean War ===
When the Korean War broke out in June 1950, the 3rd Wing participated from the first bombing sortie to the very last during the Korean War. The 8th Bombardment Squadron, staging from Iwakuni Air Base on the west coast of Japan, flew the first Air Force mission of the war on 27 June. The squadron struck North Korean ground forces, destroying several tanks and vehicles. Later that day, the 13th Bombardment Squadron attacked the tank column again. Bad weather prevented further attacks for the next two days.

The first Americans to lose their lives during the Korean War, First Lieutenant Remer L. Harding and Staff Sergeant William Goodwin, were assigned to the 13th Bomb Squadron, 3rd Bombardment Wing when they died 28 June 1950 returning from a sortie on the Korean Peninsula. President Truman, on 30 June, authorized the Air Force to strike targets in North Korea and, in another first, the 3rd Bombardment Wing launched 16 B-26 Invaders from the 8th and 13th Bombardment Squadrons against Pyongyang Airfield the same day, destroying 25 North Korean aircraft on the ground and damaging another 20. Sergeant Nyle Mickly scored the first aerial victory over North Korea by shooting down a fighter.

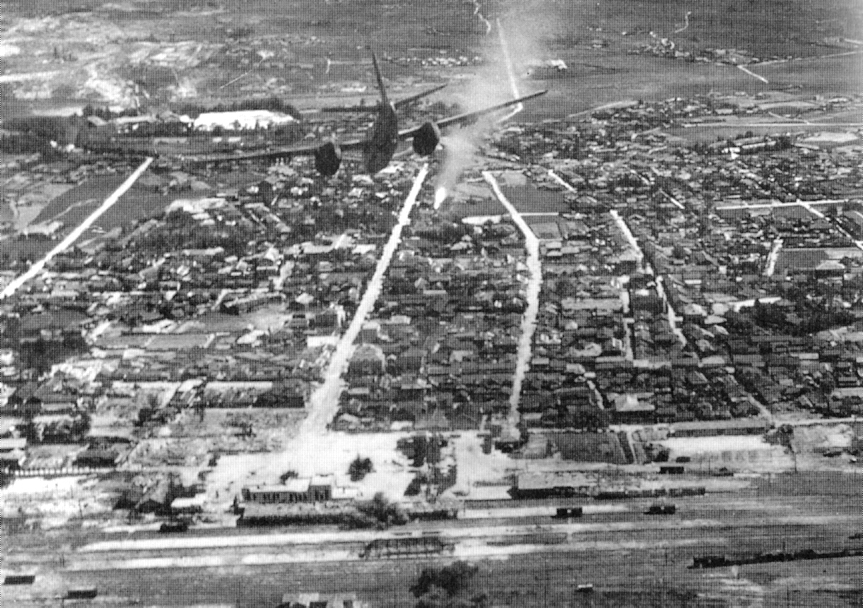
A 3rd Bombardment Group (Light) B-26 Invader conducts a rocket attack on the rail yard at Iri, South Korea, in early September 1950 as part of deception operations to draw enemy attention away from the planned amphibious landings at Incheon.

On 1 July 1950, the 3rd Bombardment Group moved to Iwakuni Air Base, Japan, where it could be closer to its targets. The wing headquarters remained at Yokota until 1 December 1950, when it joined the group. Initially, the 3rd Bombardment Group operated under the operational control of Fifth Air Force. Control reverted to the wing headquarters on 1 December 1950. The group continued to strike targets in North Korea and fly low-level attacks against advancing North Korean columns. By the end of July, the North Koreans had been forced to stay off the roads during daylight hours. The group switched to night missions in August 1950, flying its jet-black B-26s against North Korean convoys and other targets from its base at Iwakuni. On 15 September 1950, General MacArthur conducted his surprise landing at Incheon, with the ensuing Battle of Inchon cutting off the North Koreans in the south and shifting the initiative to the United Nations forces.

The 731st Bombardment Squadron (Light, Night Attack), a reserve unit called to active duty, joined the group's three squadron in November 1950 and remained until June 1951. Operations continued into 1951 as the defensive lines stabilized following the entry of the Chinese Communist People's Liberation Army into the conflict in late 1950. The 3rd Bombardment Group, then back under control of the 3rd Bombardment Wing, continued its night interdiction missions against targets in North Korea.

The 3rd Bombardment Group physically rejoined its parent wing when both moved to Kunsan Air Base (K-8), South Korea in August 1951. Colonel Nils O. Odman, who had assumed command of the wing in July, had searchlights mounted on B-26s. The new illumination proved highly effective over the flares that had been used. During the first mission, the wing's B-26 crews succeeded in destroying an entire enemy freight train.

Captain John S. Walmsley, Jr. was posthumously awarded the Medal of Honor for his actions on 14 September 1951: flying a night mission in a B-26, Capt Walmsley discovered and attacked an enemy supply train, and after exhausting his ammunition, he flew at low altitude to direct other aircraft to the same objective; the train was destroyed but Walmsley's plane crashed in the target area.

The 3rd Bombardment Wing continued to serve in Korea for the remainder of the war. In recognition of the wing's distinguished service, the 3rd Bombardment Wing's was granted the privilege of conducting the last bombing mission over North Korea minutes before implementation of the Korean Armistice Agreement. At 9:31 pm, 27 July 1953, as midnight approached for the cease-fire to take effect, the 8th Bombardment Squadron bombed a troop concentration in North Korea.

When the 3rd Bombardment Wing's units completed their war tour in Korea, they had racked up a record that included the first and last bombing missions of the war. The squadrons had flown 33,220 sorties, destroyed 31,026 vehicles, 337 locomotives, 2,920 boxcars, 116 bridges, and 529 buildings, and cut 918 roads and 841 rail lines.

=== Cold War ===
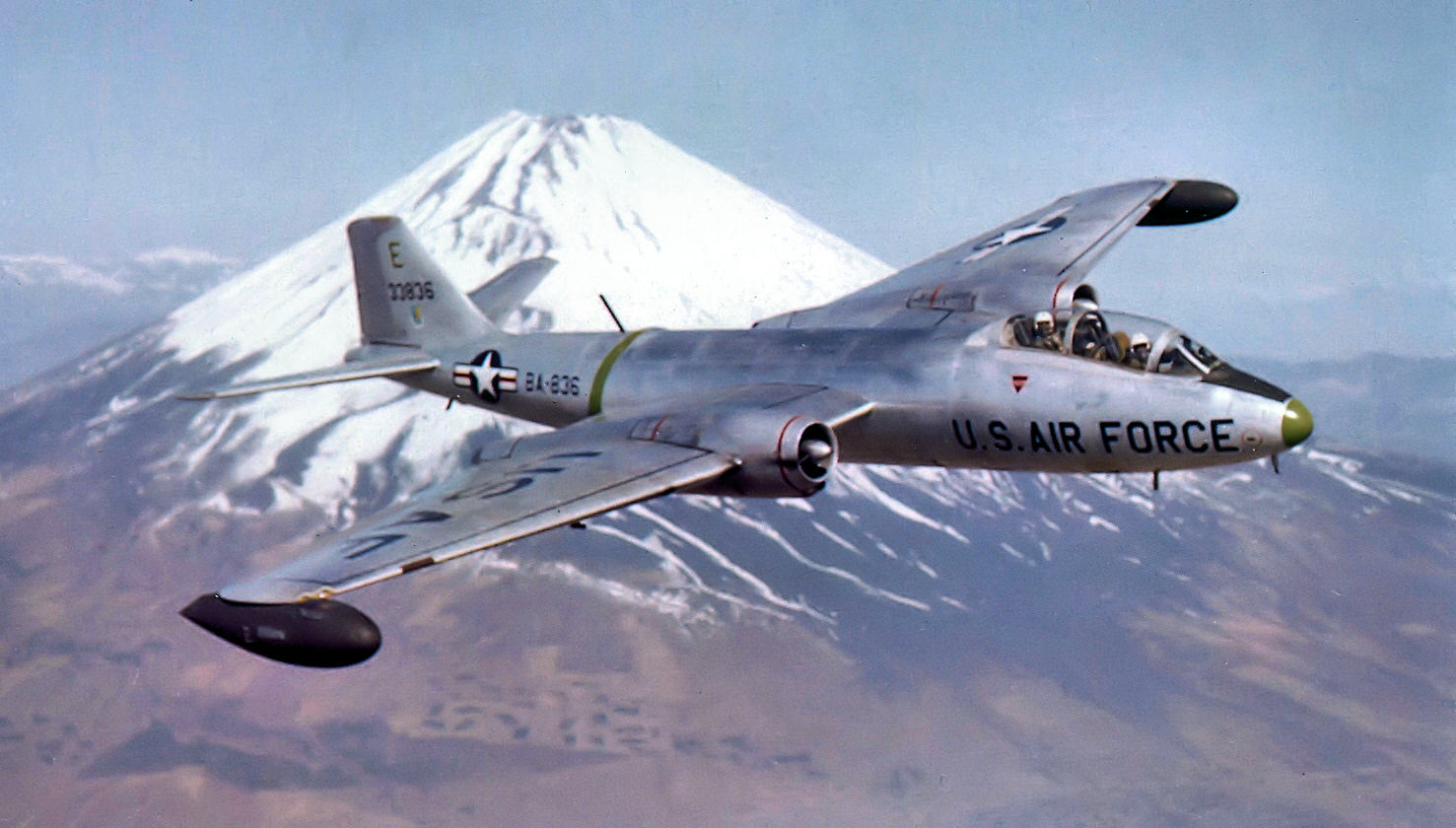
3rd Bombardment Group B-57C 53-836 by Mount Fuji about 1957

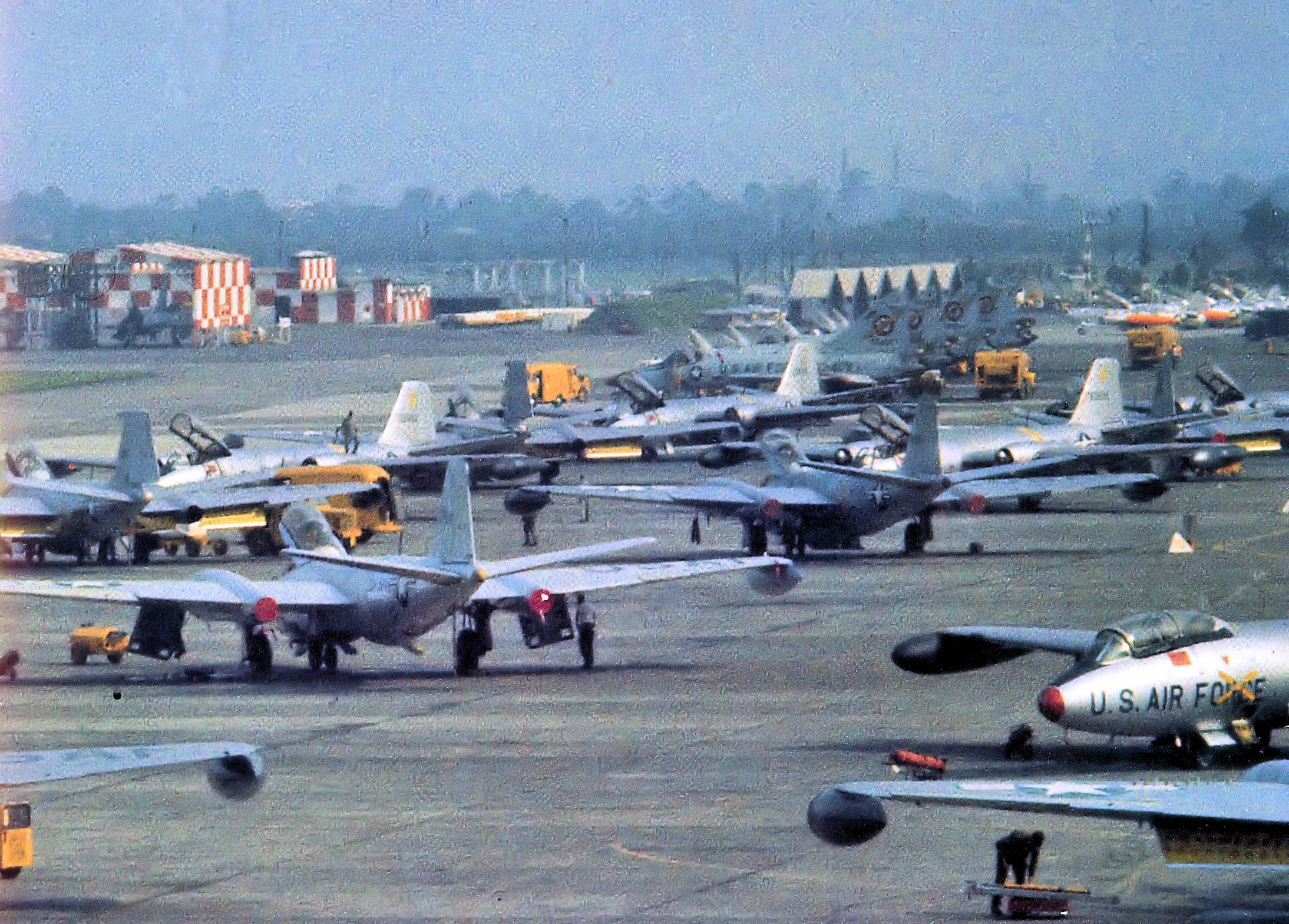
B-57Bs on the flightline at Johnson AB, about 1957

With the war over in Korea, wing returned to the routine of peacetime duty in the Cold War environment. It remained at Kunsan Air Base until October 1954, when it moved to Johnson Air Base, Japan. In late 1955, the 3rd Bombardment Group received its first Martin B-57B Canberra Night Intruder and began to convert from the B-26.

The 3rd Bombardment Group was reduced to one officer and an enlisted man on 13 August 1956, essentially becoming a paper organization. The wing headquarters assumed direct control over the 8th, 13th, and 90th Bombardment Squadrons. Finally, the Air Force inactivated the 3rd Bombardment Group on 25 October 1957, as part of a reorganization plan that created wing deputy commanders for various functional areas and gave wing commanders more direct control over their units. While the group ceased to exist after 36 years of service, its proud heritage, in the form of its emblem and battle honors remained with the 3rd Bombardment Wing.

The B-57Bs suffered from engine malfunctions which filled up the cockpit with toxic fumes, which led to a brief grounding. The USAF was not very happy with the B-57B as it was initially produced. It was still deemed to be inadequate to meet the night intruder and close support role for which it had originally been designed. In August 1958, mainland Chinese forces began bombarding the Nationalist-held island of Quemoy. The 3rd BG stood by in Japan to strike strategic targets in China, North Korea and possibly even the Soviet Union should the crisis escalate out of control. Fortunately, the crisis soon cooled and hostilities were averted.

However, the USAF began to re-equip its B-57 wings with the supersonic F-100 Super Sabre tactical fighter-bomber. As the active duty USAF TAC bomb groups were re-equipped, their aircraft were transferred to the Air National Guard (ANG). By 1959 the 3rd Bomb Wing was the last unit equipped with the B-57A, its primary mission being a SIOP (Single Integrated Operations Plan) to perform "Quick Strikes" against strategic targets on the mainland of Communist China, North Korea and the Eastern Soviet Union. As nuclear weapons could not be stored in Japan, the B-57s were forward deployed to Kunsan Air Base, South Korea, where they stood nuclear alert.

With nuclear-armed B-57Bs ready to be launched against pre-programmed targets within fifteen minutes, alerts lasted 30 days at a time, but soon changed to a two-week rotation schedule from Yokota Air Base as each of the three squadrons of the 3rd took their turn rotating crews. In 1961, Air Defense Command sent F-102 Delta Daggers to the 3rd, where the 40th Fighter-Interceptor Squadron flew air defense missions over Japan for a six-month TDY.

In late 1963, the 3rd Bomb Wing prepared to stand down in Japan as the USAF wanted to reduce the number of wings in Japan. Although the Wing would be inactivated, two of the B-57 squadrons, the 8th and the 13th were transferred to the direct control of the 41st Air Division and later to the 2nd Air Division at Yokota where they continued the South Korean nuclear alert mission as the USAF mulled over the fate of the B-57B. However, the increasing demands for aircraft in South Vietnam for use in the escalating conflict with North Vietnam caused the Air force to reconsider the inactivation. The aircraft to be moved to Clark Air Base, Philippines under Thirteenth Air Force.

In January 1964 the wing was re designated as the 3rd Tactical Fighter Wing, and moved without personnel or equipment to England Air Force Base, Louisiana under Tactical Air Command.

The 3rd Tactical Fighter Wing kept the 90th Bombardment Squadron, now redesignated as a tactical fighter squadron, and gained the 416th, 510th and 531st Tactical Fighter Squadrons. While at England, the wing was brought up to full strength and transitioned into flying primarily North American F-100D/F Super Sabres.

=== Vietnam War ===
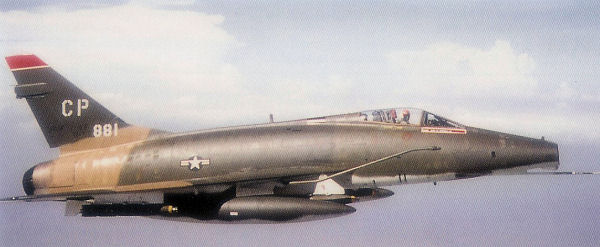
North American F-100D-50-NH Super Sabre 55-2881 of the 3rd TFW 531st TFS at Bien Hoa AB

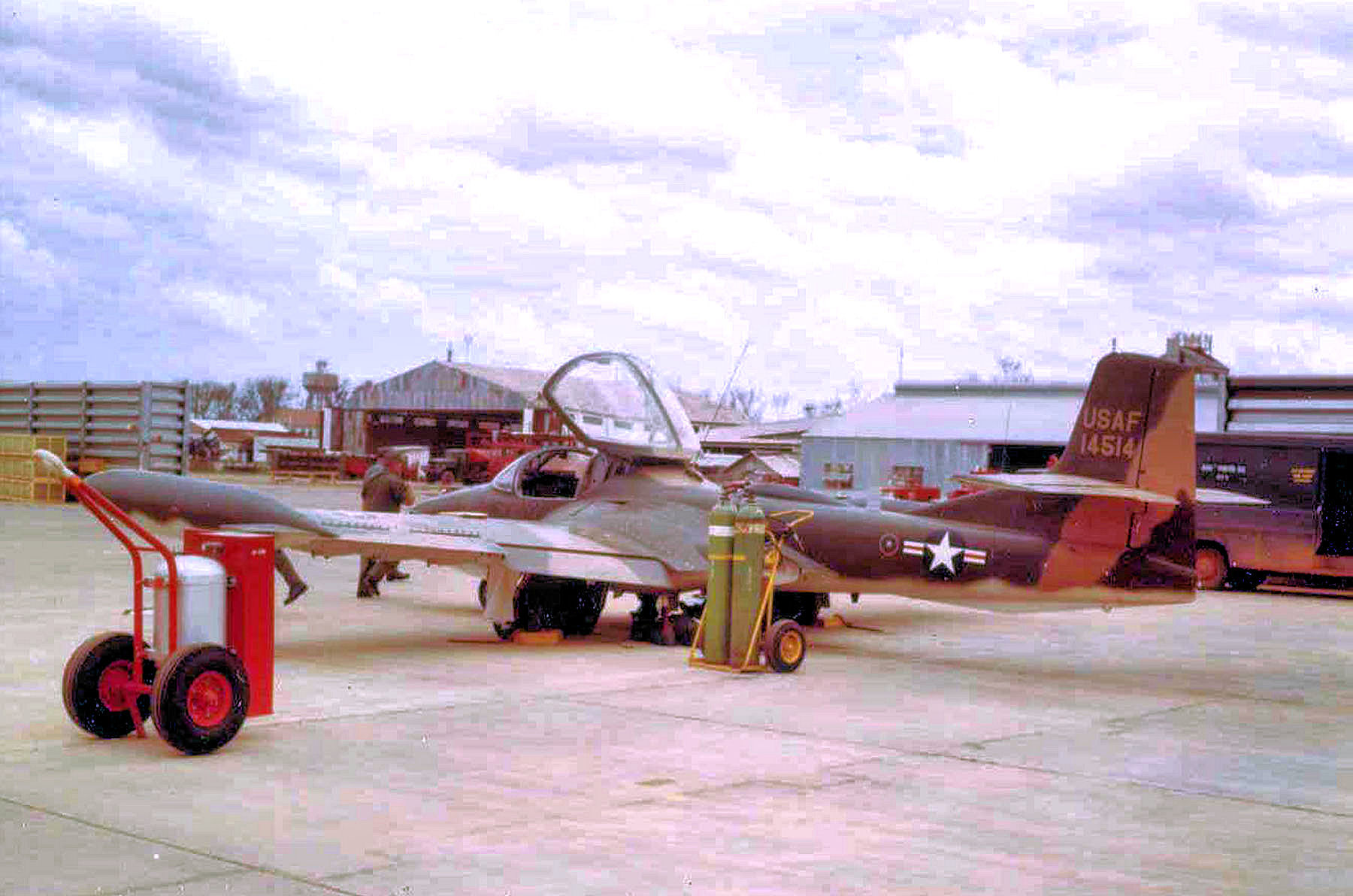
3rd Tactical Fighter Wing A-37A Dragonfly 67-14515 Bien Hoa AB 1968

The wing began deploying its units to South Vietnam on rotational duty while the others trained in their ground support role. In November 1965, the wing moved to Bien Hoa Air Base, South Vietnam as part of the major buildup of forces following President Johnson's decision to commit ground troops. In the years ahead, the wing found itself involved in a variety of duties throughout South Vietnam. Its mission included close air support, counterinsurgency, forward air control, interdiction and radar-controlled bombing. The wing supported numerous ground operations with air strike missions against enemy fortifications, supply areas, lines of communications and personnel, in addition to providing suppressive fire during assault operations.

While assigned to Bien Hoa, the wing gained control of various units with different missions. It also supported the testing of the Northrop F-5A Freedom Fighter being developed for other nations under the Skoshi Tiger project. The wing successfully flew the F-5 in combat from April 1966 to April 1967, before turning the fighters over to the Republic of Vietnam Air Force.

The Wing also evaluated the combat capabilities of the Cessna A-37 Dragonfly during November and December 1967. The attack version of the USAF's primary trainer proved highly adaptable in its ground support role. The 604th Air Commando Squadron, attached to the Wing, flew the Dragonfly from November 1967 to September 1970.

In late 1969 the F-100s of the 3rd TFW began a phaseout at Bien Hoa. The 510th TFS was inactivated on 15 November 1969, the 531st TFS on 31 July 1970. The wing converted to the A-37 in 1969. The 90th Tactical Fighter Squadron reverted to its pre-World War II designation of an attack squadron. The 8th Bombardment Squadron was reactivated as the 8th Attack Squadron. During May and June 1970, the wing participated in the Cambodian campaign aimed at depriving the enemy the use of its sanctuary bases and destroying its leadership. The campaign marked the wing's last major operation.

On 31 October 1970, the wing ended its duties in South Vietnam. Unmanned and unequipped, the wing remained active in a "paper" status until it moved to Kunsan Air Base, South Korea on 15 March 1971. The wing had served for 59 consecutive months of combat duty in Vietnam. It had withstood mortar and rocket attacks and in return had inflicted over 23,000 battle deaths on the enemy.

After a 20-year absence, the wing returned to Kunsan Air Base where it was equipped with the McDonnell F-4D Phantom II. Squadrons assigned included the 35th, 36th and 80th Tactical Fighter Squadrons. The wing helped provide air defense for South Korea and maintained proficiency for combat operations. During this period, the wing received a short notice requirement to deploy 18 F-4Ds from the 35th Tactical Fighter Squadron in early April 1972 in support of Operation Linebacker. The air campaign was designed to stop the North Vietnamese 1972 Easter Offensive, launched on 30 March to conquer South Vietnam. The squadron deployed with a full complement of aircrews and maintenance personnel. During its stay in South Vietnam, nine members of the squadron received credit for destroying six North Vietnamese fighters, four MiG-21s and two MiG-19s.

=== Clark Air Base ===
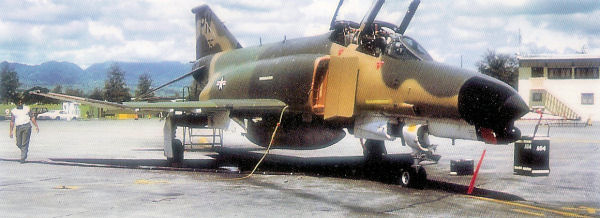
McDonnell Douglas F-4G Phantom Serial 69-0275 of the 90th TFS/3rd TFW Clark AB, Philippines, 1979 (Note: Later, this aircraft was converted to the F-4G configuration. To AMARC as FP1024 25 March 1996. To Holloman AFB as QF-4G AF151. Expended 2/5/1998.)

On 16 September 1974, the 3rd Tactical Fighter Wing moved without personnel and equipment from Kunsan Air Base, South Korea to Clark Air Base, Philippines. It replaced the inactivated 405th Tactical Fighter Wing. Assigned squadrons included the 26th, 68th and 90th Tactical Fighter Squadrons.

The 90th Fighter Squadron flew the F-4D Phantom II. The other two squadrons did not have assigned aircraft at the time. The wing's mission required it to organize and train for combat. It also helped provide air defense for the Philippines. The wing's first big challenge at Clark Air Base, surprisingly did not involve its wartime skills.

With the pending fall of South Vietnam, President Gerald Ford announced that the United States would support the evacuation of approximately 2,000 orphans from South Vietnam. The 3rd Tactical Fighter Wing began preparing for the evacuation on 3 April 1975, by converting the base gym into a temporary orphan care center. The first aircraft began arriving at Clark on 5 April. In addition to the expected orphans, the wing discovered that a larger number of adults were also fleeing South Vietnam. When the humanitarian operation ended on 31 May, 1,500 orphans had passed through Clark to the United States in what was termed Operation Baby Lift. New Life, the evacuation of adults to the United States and elsewhere, accounted for 8,786 evacuees supported by the 3rd Tactical Fighter Wing.

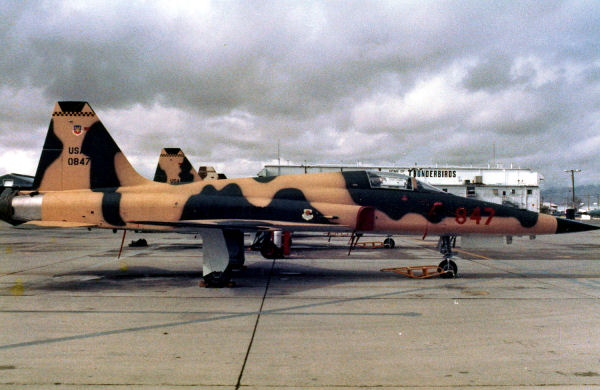
Northrop F-5E Tiger IIs of the 26th Training Aggressor Squadron at Clark AB (Note: F-5E serial 73-847 in foreground was originally scheduled for shipment to the Republic of Vietnam Air Force, however the aircraft was retained by the USAF after the collapse of the South Vietnamese government in 1975. With the inactivation of the 26th in 1988, this aircraft was sold to the Honduras Air Force.)

The wing grew in strength during 1975. The 26th Tactical Fighter Squadron received the Northrop T-38 Talon for use as dissimilar air combat training and was re designated the 26th Tactical Fighter Training Squadron. The 90th Tactical Fighter Squadron converted to the F-4E. The 3rd Tactical Fighter Squadron, equipped with the F-4E joined the wing in December, replacing the 68th Tactical Fighter Squadron, which had been inactivated earlier. The wing now possessed a full complement of fighters.

On 15 May 1976, the wing gained the 3rd Tactical Electronic Warfare Training Squadron and began operating the Crow Valley Bombing and Gunnery Range. In July the Pacific Air Forces initiated its Cope Thunder training exercises, for which the wing became responsible. It October 1977, the 26th Tactical Fighter Training Squadron switched from the T-38 to the Northrop F-5E Tiger II, which served as an aggressor aircraft.

The wing switched to an air superiority mission in January 1978, and on 30 July 1977, the 90th Tactical Fighter Squadron began equipping with the F-4G. A modification of the F-4E, the Advanced Wild Weasel aircraft performed a ground radar suppression and destruction mission. With the addition of the F-4G, the 3rd Tactical Fighter Wing acquired the triple role capabilities of air sovereignty, air-to-ground and defense suppression/electronic countermeasures. The wing also provided fighter aggressor training with the F-5E. Versatile and capable, the wing deployed its units throughout the Pacific and supported the training requirements of others. The wing also operated Bell UH-1N helicopters in range support.

In 1989, the Philippine government had expressed the desire that the Americans withdraw its forces from the islands. Ten years prior, the 1947 Military Bases Agreement between the two nations had been amended to provide Philippine sovereignty over the bases.

The general instability in the Philippines kept the 3rd Tactical Fighter Wing in place during Desert Shield and Desert Storm. The Wing, however, deployed six F-4Es to Incirlik Air Base, Turkey for Operation Desert Storm in early 1991, flying an 18,600-mile deployment. There they joined the 7440th Composite Wing (Provisional). They were mission ready within 36 hours and they flew some of that aircraft's last combat sorties.

The wing remained at Clark, though treaty negotiations with the Philippines broke down, and it was decided to move the 3rd Wing beginning in 1992–93. The Mount Pinatubo eruption in June 1991 changed these plans and forced the wing's hasty relocation without personnel or equipment to Elmendorf Air Force Base, Alaska on 19 December 1991, where it replaced the 21st Wing which previously was the host organization for Elemendorf.

=== Elmendorf Air Force Base ===
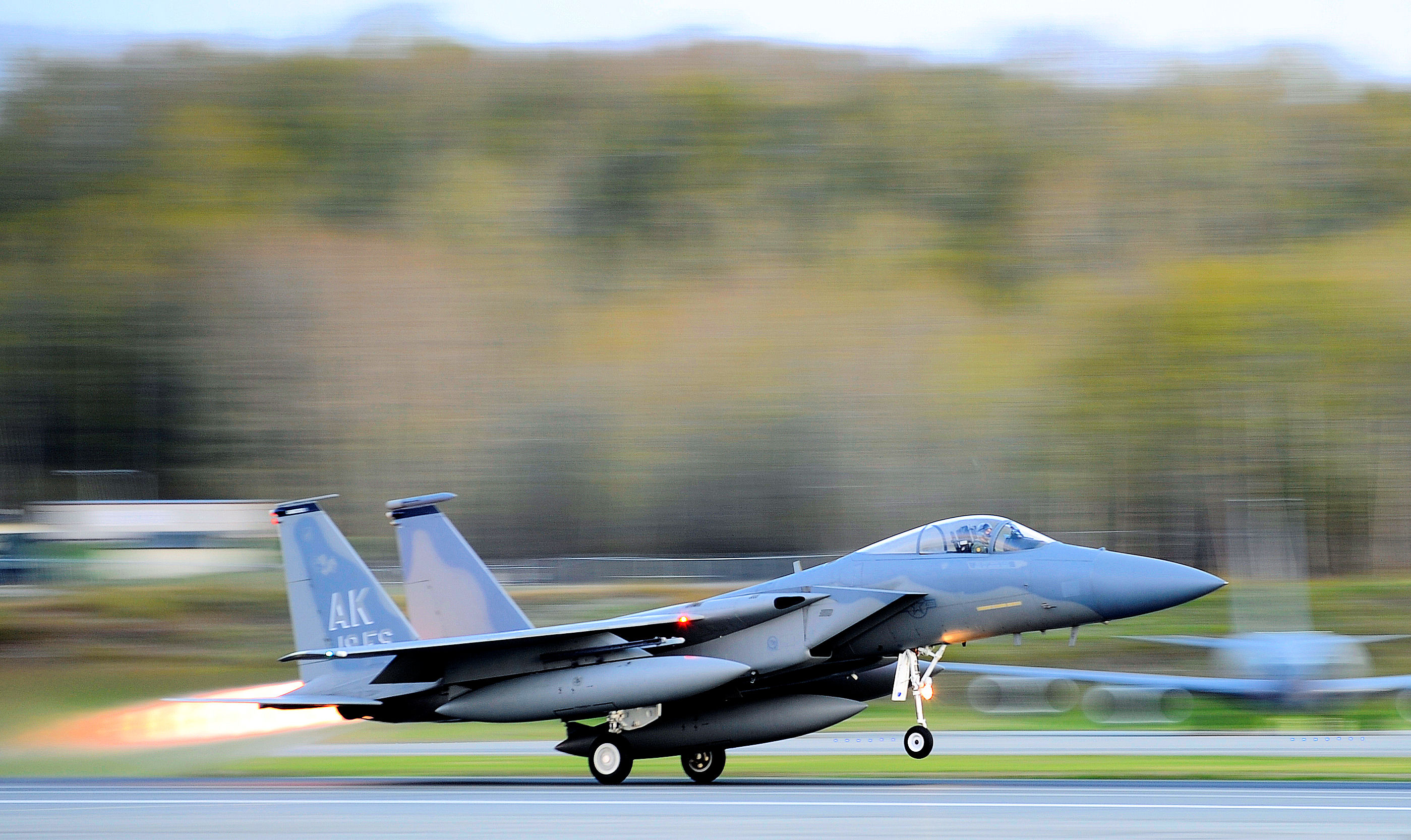
The 19th Fighter Squadron's F-15 Eagle flagship takes off for the final time at Elmendorf Air Force Base, Alaska, 13 May 2010

With the reassignment, to Alaska, the wing was also redesignated as the 3rd Wing and was realigned to the multi-mission objective wing concept.

On assignment to Elmendorf, the 3rd Wing gained the 43rd and 54th Fighter Squadrons and reunited with the 90th Fighter Squadron. The 90th Fighter Squadron, on arrival on Elmendorf, had been equipped with the McDonnell-Douglas F-15E Strike Eagle. It provided the only Air Force long-range interdiction capability in the Pacific Theater. The other two squadrons were equipped with the F-15C Eagle, and provided an air superiority not only for Alaska but also for other worldwide locations.

The 3rd Wing further gained in capability with the assignment of the Lockheed C-130H Hercules equipped 517th Airlift Squadron in April 1992 and the 962nd Airborne Air Control Squadron and its two Boeing E-3B Sentry aircraft on 1 October 1992. The 3rd Wing provided a composite force that could be rapidly deployed worldwide, which it quickly began to prove. The wing also participated in the Cope Thunder exercise series, which had been moved from Clark Air Base to Eielson Air Force Base in the early 1990s.

On 1 January 1994, the 43rd Tactical Fighter Squadron was inactivated and the 19th Tactical Fighter Squadron activated, inheriting the personnel and equipment of the former. In an action symbolizing the transition from the Cold War to a broader worldwide responsibility, the 3rd Wing, on 29 April 1994, ended the last 24-hour air defense alert requirement at King Salmon Airport. The forward operating bases at King Salmon and Galena reverted to contractor operations and were placed in a standby mode.

The wing's mission shifted to providing trained and equipped forces for deployment throughout the Pacific Region, as reflected by the motto at the front gate "Top Cover and Global Engagement." By 1995, the 3rd Wing's fighter capability had gained recognition throughout the Air Force. The 54th Fighter Squadron made the first operational deployment outside of Alaska when it deployed eight F-15Cs and 90 plus personnel to Incirlik Air Base, Turkey in support of Operation Provide Comfort. They departed on 8 April and returned on 17 July 1995. Only six months later the 90th Fighter Squadron deployed 8 F-15Es and 190 personnel to Aviano Air Base, Italy, in support of Operation Deny Flight/Joint Endeavor. Other deployments continued on an almost routine basis, involving not only the fighter squadrons but 517th Airlift Squadron and the 962nd Airborne Air Control Squadron. In early 1999, the Air Force recognized the 3rd Wing as the number three of ten lead Air Expeditionary Wings with a commitment of deploy.

The 3rd Wing also engaged in an exchange program with the Russian Air Force. The wing hosted a visit of 40 Russian air defense personnel and 4 SU-27s in 1995, and in turn visited Russia the next year with four F-15s.

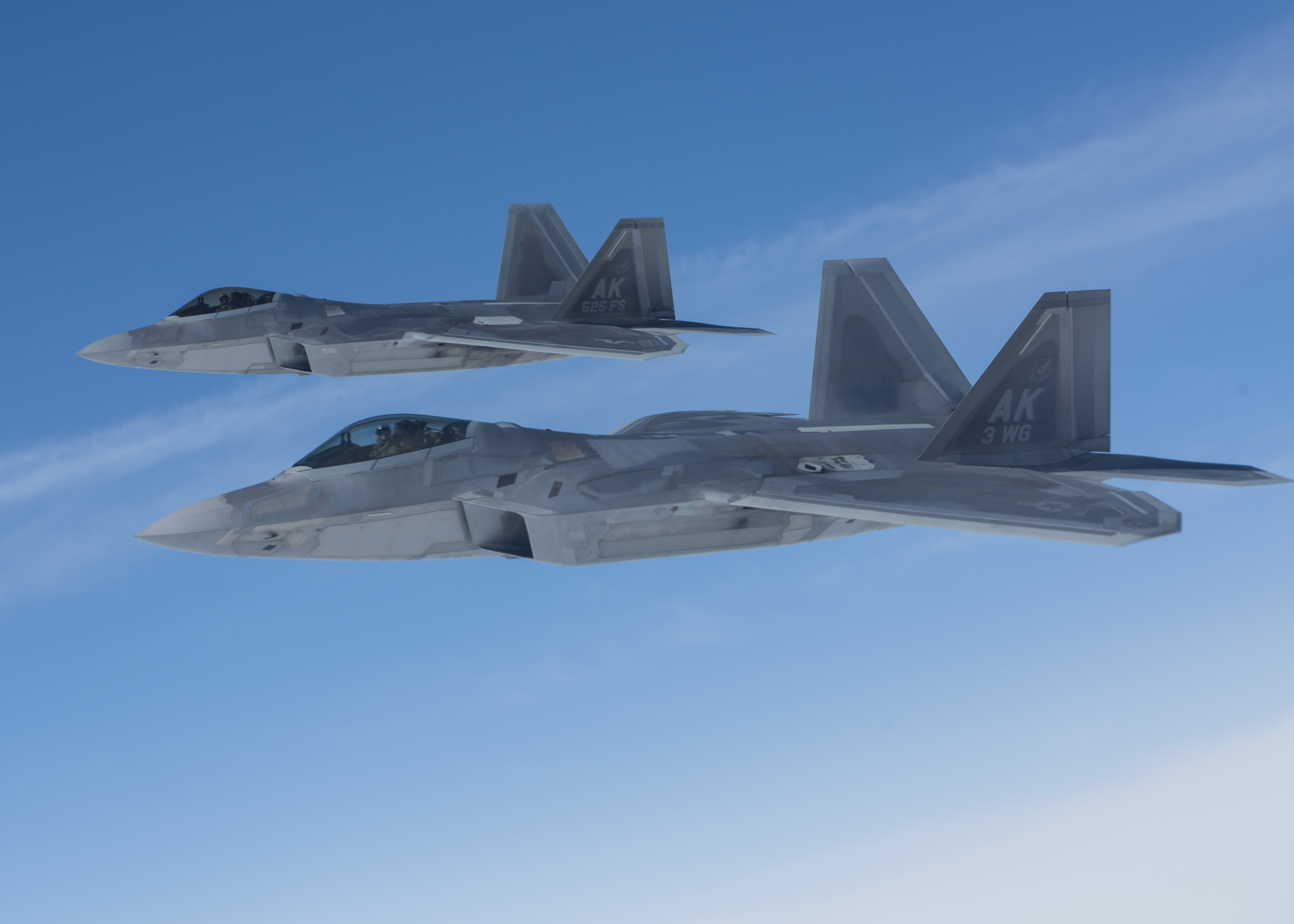
Two F-22 Raptors from the 3rd Wing, 20 April 2020

Today, the 3rd Wing continues to grow in size and importance because of its strategic location and training facilities. It deploys and employs assigned aircraft worldwide to accomplish air superiority, air interdiction, tactical airlift, airborne air surveillance, theater resupply, passenger service and served as host unit for all Elmemdorf organizations.

During 2004, fulfilled Air Expeditionary Force (AEF) taskings in support of Operations Enduring Freedom and Iraqi Freedom.

== Lineage ==
- Constituted as the 3rd Bombardment Wing, Light on 10 August 1948

Activated on 18 August 1948
Redesignated 3rd Bombardment Wing, Tactical on 1 October 1955
Redesignated 3rd Tactical Fighter Wing on 8 January 1964
Redesignated 3rd Wing on 19 December 1991

=== Assignments ===
- 314th Air Division, 18 August 1948
- Fifth Air Force, 1 March 1950
- 41st Air Division, 1 March 1955
- Fifth Air Force, 1 February 1957
- 41st Air Division, 10 November 1958
- Twelfth Air Force, 8 January 1964

Attached to 4481 Air Division, Provisional, 8 January-30 June 1964

- 834th Air Division, 1 July 1964
- 2nd Air Division, 8 November 1965
- Seventh Air Force, 1 April 1966
- Fifth Air Force, 15 March 1971
- 314th Air Division, 15 March 1971
- Thirteenth Air Force, 16 September 1974
- Eleventh Air Force, 19 December 1991–present

=== Components ===
Groups

- 3rd Bombardment (later, 3rd Operations): 18 August 1948 – 25 October 1957 (detached 20 July-30 November 1950); 19 December 1991–present

Squadrons

- 1st Air Commando (later, 1st Special Operations) Squadron: attached 21 November 1965 – 8 March 1966; assigned 15 January 1981 – 1 March 1983
- 1st Test Squadron: 16 September 1974 – 1 January 1980 (detached 15 March 1979 – 1 January 1980)
- 3rd Tactical Electronic Warfare Training Squadron: 15 May 1976 – 1 January 1980
- 3rd Tactical Fighter Squadron: 15 December 1975 – 19 December 1991 (detached 15–16 December 1975)
- 7th Airborne Command and Control Squadron: 31 March-14 August 1975 (detached)
- 8th Bombardment (later, 8th Attack) Squadron: attached 13 August 1956 – 24 October 1957, assigned 25 October 1957 – 8 January 1964 (detached 1 September 1963 – 8 January 1964); assigned 15 November 1969 – 30 September 1970
- 8th Tactical Reconnaissance Squadron: attached 18 April 1949 – 1 April 1950
- 10th Fighter Squadron, Commando: 8 April 1966 – 17 April 1967
- 13th Bombardment Squadron: attached 13 August 1956 – 24 October 1957, assigned 25 October 1957 – 8 January 1964 (detached 1 September 1963 – 8 January 1964)
- 20th Operations Squadron: 16 September 1974 – 31 March 1975
- 25th Tactical Fighter Squadron: 18–19 December 1975
- 26th Tactical Fighter (later, 26th Tactical Fighter Training; 26th Tactical Fighter Training Aggressor; 26th Aggressor) Squadron: 16 September 1974 – 1 October 1988
- 35th Tactical Fighter Squadron: 15 March 1971 – 16 September 1974 (detached 1 April-12 October 1972)
- 36th Tactical Fighter Squadron: 15 May 1971 – 16 September 1974
- 40th Fighter-Interceptor Squadron: attached 1 December 1961 – 31 May 1962
- 44th Tactical Fighter Squadron: attached 3 April-2 June 1972 and 28 July-8 September 1972
- 67th Tactical Fighter Squadron: attached 2 June-28 July 1972 and 8 September-16 October 1972
- 68th Tactical Fighter Squadron: 16 September 1974 – 30 September 1975
- 80th Tactical Fighter Squadron: 15 March 1971 – 16 September 1974
- 90th Bombardment (later, 90th Tactical Fighter; 90th Attack; 90th Tactical Fighter) Squadron: attached 13 August 1956 – 24 October 1957, assigned 25 October 1957 – 8 January 1964 (detached 1 September 1963 – 8 January 1964); assigned 9 June 1964 – 19 November 1965 (detached 3 February-10 May 1965 and 3 August-19 November 1965); assigned 3 February 1966 – 31 October 1970; assigned 16 September 1974 – 29 May 1991
- 307th Tactical Fighter Squadron: attached 21 November-6 December 1965
- 308th Tactical Fighter Squadron: 2 December 1965 – 25 December 1966 (detached 15 November-25 December 1966)
- 310th Attack Squadron: 15–30 November 1969
- 311th Attack Squadron: 15 November-15 December 1969
- 416th Tactical Fighter Squadron: 16 June 1964 – 8 November 1965 (detached 14 March-21 July 1965); 16 November 1965 – 15 April 1967 (detached 16 November 1965 – 15 June 1966)
- 421st Air Refueling Squadron: attached 21 November 1960 – 1 June 1962
- 429th Tactical Fighter Squadron: attached c. 21 November-14 December 1965
- 510th Tactical Fighter Squadron: 16 March 1964 – 15 November 1969 (detached 5 May-c. 20 August 1965)
- 531st Tactical Fighter Squadron: 16 June 1964 – 19 November 1965 (detached 2 November 1964 – 18 March 1965); 7 December 1965 – 31 July 1970
- 602d Fighter Squadron: attached 21 November 1965 – 8 March 1966
- 604th Air Commando (later, 604th Special Operations) Squadron: attached 15 November 1967 – 1 March 1970, assigned 1 March-30 September 1970
- 731st Bombardment Squadron: attached 1 December 1950 – 25 June 1951
- 6091st Reconnaissance Squadron: attached 21 November 1960-c. 5 June 1962.

=== Stations ===
- Yokota Air Base, Japan, 18 August 1948
- Johnson Air Base, Japan, 1 April 1950
- Yokota Air Base, Japan, 14 August 1950
- Iwakuni Air Base, Japan, 1 December 1950
- Kunsan Air Base, South Korea, 22 August 1951
- Johnson Air Base, Japan, 1 October 1954
- Yokota Air Base, Japan, 18 November 1960 – 8 January 1964
- England Air Base, Louisiana, 8 January 1964 – November 1965
- Bien Hoa Air Base, South Vietnam, 8 November 1965
- Kunsan Air Base, South Korea, 15 March 1971
- Clark Air Base, Philippines, 16 September 1974 – 19 December 1991
- Elmendorf Air Force Base, Alaska, 19 December 1991–present

=== Aircraft ===
- B-26 Invader (1948–1950, 1950–1956)
- F-15 Reporter (1949)
- RF-80 (1949–1950)
- C-47 Skytrain (1951)
- B-57 Canberra (1956–1963)
- B-50 Superfortress (1960–1961)
- B-50 Superfortress (1960–1962)
- C-130 Hercules (1961–1962, 1992–present)
- F-102 Delta Dagger (1961–1962)
- F-100 Super Sabre (1964–1970)
- Northrop F-5 (1965–1967, 1977–1988)
- A-1 Skyraider (1965–1966)
- U-10 (1965–1966)
- C/AC/HC-47 (1965–1966)
- A-37 Dragonfly (1967–1970)
- F-4 Phantom II (1971–1974, 1974–1991)
- T-33 Shooting Star (1974–1987)
- McDonnell Douglas C-9 (1974–1975)
- CH-3 (1974–1975)
- T-38 Talon (1976–1980)
- C-130H (2010–2013)
- UH-1N Iroquois (1989–1991)
- F-15 Eagle (1991–2010)
- C-12 Huron (1992–2006)
- E-3 Sentry (1993–present)
- C-17 Globemaster III (2007–present,1 crashed at Elmendorf AFB)
- F-22 Raptor (2007–present)
