= 7440th Composite Wing =

7440th Composite Wing (Provisional)
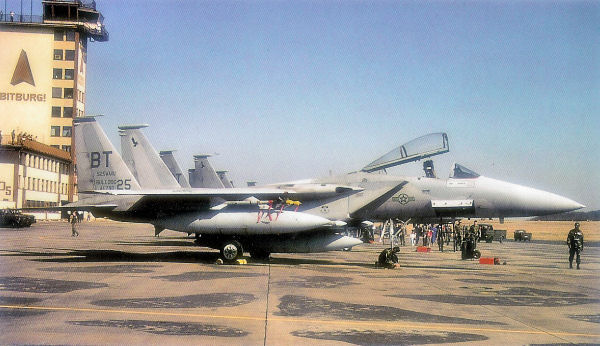
- F-15s of the 53d and 525th Tactical Fighter Squadrons returning to Bitburg Air Base after being deployed in support of Operation Desert Shield/Storm, 13 March 1991.
- Country: United States
- Type: Wing (Provisional)
- Role: Combat Composite Wing
- Part of: United States Air Forces in Europe
- Garrison/HQ: Incirlik Air Base, Turkey

Insignia
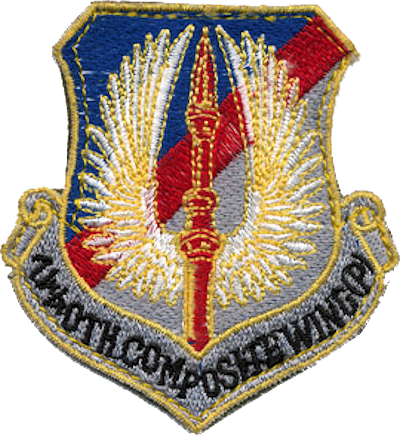
- 7440th Composite Wing (P) - Emblem

Aircraft flown
- Attack: MC/HC-130 Hercules
- Bomber: F-111E Aardvark
- Electronic warfare: EF-111A Raven; EC-130H Compass Call; F-4G Phantom II; E-3B Sentry
- Fighter: F-4E Phantom II; F-15C Eagle; F-16C Fighting Falcon
- Reconnaissance: RF-4C Phantom
- Transport: C-130E Hercules

The 7440th Composite Wing (Provisional) was a Major Air Command-controlled (MAJCON) temporary wing of the United States Air Forces in Europe (USAFE), active in Turkey in 1991. The concentration of aircraft under the 7440th Wing's control made possible the opening of a "northern front" against Iraq, via Turkey, during the 1991 Gulf War.

== Formation ==
By late December 1990, there was already a formidable arsenal of USAFE airpower deployed to Turkey: 20 F-111Es, 24 F-16Cs, 10 F-15Cs, and 4 SAC KC-135s. These aircraft were in Turkey for various reasons including rotational training, a NATO exercise, and NATO alert duty, but remained under control of their respective home units. Eventually more than 100 USAFE aircraft and 2,600 personnel deployed to Incirlik. However, if Turkey approved the task force's activation, Joint Task Force Proven Force could absorb all of these assets and the others it required.

== Operations ==
The Turkish government finally approved the JTF on 15 January 1991. The following day, USAFE activated the Wing and began the command's largest Desert Shield deployment, bringing the total number of aircraft at Incirlik to 110. However, it was not until 17 January, the first day of Desert Storm, that Turkey approved operations from Incirlik. Therefore, JTF Proven Force entered the war on Day Two.

In January 1991, USAFE leadership deployed USAF officers from the 16th Air Force Regional Cost Center (based at Torrejon AB, Spain) to compile and prepare a report on the overall cost effectiveness and efficiencies of operating an active, wartime Composite Wing.

The 3rd Tactical Fighter Wing deployed six F-4Es to join the 7440th Wing in early 1991, flying an 18,600-mile deployment. They were mission ready within 36 hours and they flew some of that aircraft's last combat sorties. The 20th Tactical Fighter Wing had aircraft deployed to Incirlik for a Weapons Training Deployment in August 1990, when Iraq invaded Kuwait. As the start of the air campaign neared, the 20th TFW reinforced its presence, as all US aircraft at Incirlik were incorporated into the 7440th Composite Wing (Provisional).

Following Desert Storm, the 7440th Wing conducted all initial planning, logistics, and air operations for Operation Provide Comfort, airlift missions to supply over 1 million Kurdish refugees in the mountains of Northern Iraq. In the 31 days of airlift operations without benefit of friendly ground forces at the drop zones, the 6-nation airlift dropped more tonnage and flew more miles than the entire Berlin Airlift. As Provide Comfort continued after the introduction of 10th Special Forces into the refugee camps, the 7440th transitioned into Joint Task Force Provide Comfort. The initial airlift was under the command of Colonel Chuck Wald with Lt. Colonel Mike DeCapua as planning and intelligence section chief.

== Composition ==
Unit	Tail Code	Aircraft Type	Notes
3rd Tactical Fighter Squadron	PN	F-4E Phantom II	Deployed from 3rd Tactical Fighter Wing, Clark Air Base, The Philippines (6 Aircraft)
7th Special Operations Squadron		MC/HC-130H	Deployed from 39th Special Operations Wing, Rhein-Main AB, Germany (7 Aircraft)
20th Tactical Fighter Wing *	UH	F-111E	* Composed of flights from the 55th, 77th, 79th Tactical Fighter Squadrons, RAF Upper Heyford, England (22 Aircraft)
37th Tactical Airlift Squadron		C-130H	Deployed from 435th Tactical Airlift Wing, Rhein-Main AB, Germany (11 Aircraft)
38th Tactical Reconnaissance Squadron	ZR	RF-4C Phantom II	Deployed from 26th Tactical Reconnaissance Wing, Zweibrücken AB, Germany (6 Aircraft)
42d Electronic Combat Squadron	UH	EF-111A	Deployed from 66th Electronic Combat Wing, RAF Upper Heyford, England (6 Aircraft)
43d Electronic Combat Squadron	SB	EC-130H Compass Call	Deployed from 66th Electronic Combat Wing, Sembach AB, Germany (3 Aircraft)
52d Tactical Fighter Wing *	SP	F-4G Phantom II	* Composed of flights from the 23d Tactical Fighter Squadron, Spangdahlem AB, Germany (12 x F-16C and 12 x F-4G Aircraft)flying mixed Hunter Killer Wild Weasel pairs.
61st Tactical Airlift Squadron		C-130H	Deployed from 435th Tactical Airlift Wing, Rhein-Main AB, Germany (8 Aircraft)
525th Tactical Fighter Squadron	BT	F-15C Eagle	Deployed from 36th Tactical Fighter Wing, Bitburg AB, Germany (24 Aircraft)
32nd Tactical Fighter Squadron	CR	F-15C Eagle	Deployed from 32nd Tactical Fighter Group, Soesterberg AB, Netherlands, (6 Aircraft)
612th Tactical Fighter Squadron	TJ	F-16C Fighting Falcon	Deployed from 401st Tactical Fighter Wing, Torrejon AB, Spain (37 Aircraft)
552d Airborne Warning and Control Wing		E-3B Sentry	Deployed from Tinker AFB, Oklahoma (Tactical Air Command) (3 Aircraft)

== See also ==
- Organization of United States Air Force Units in the Gulf War
