= 3079th Aviation Depot Wing =

3079 Aviation Depot Wing
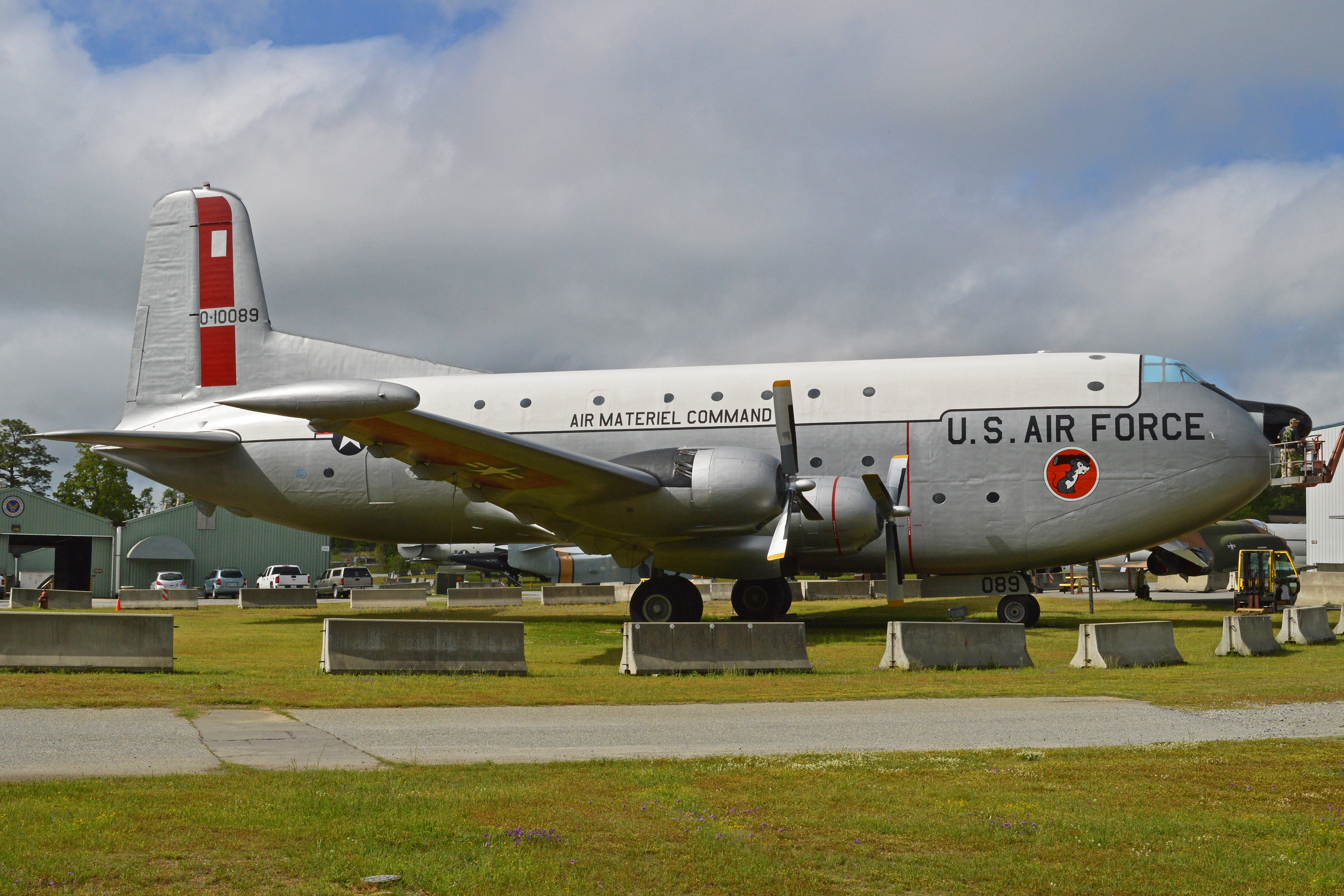
- C-124 Globemaster II in markings of 7th Logistic Support Squadron
- Active: 1955–1962
- Country: United States
- Branch: United States Air Force
- Role: Special weapons storage and transport

Insignia
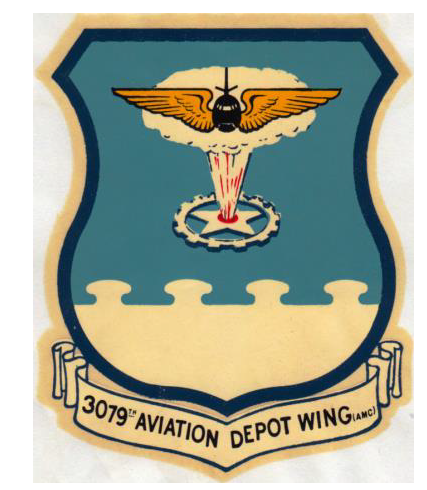
- 3079th Aviation Depot Wing emblem

The 3079th Aviation Depot Wing is a discontinued United States Air Force unit. It was stationed at Wright-Patterson Air Force Base, Ohio from February 1955 to July 1962. The wing was assigned to Air Materiel Command and was responsible for the storage and transport of special weapons.

== History ==
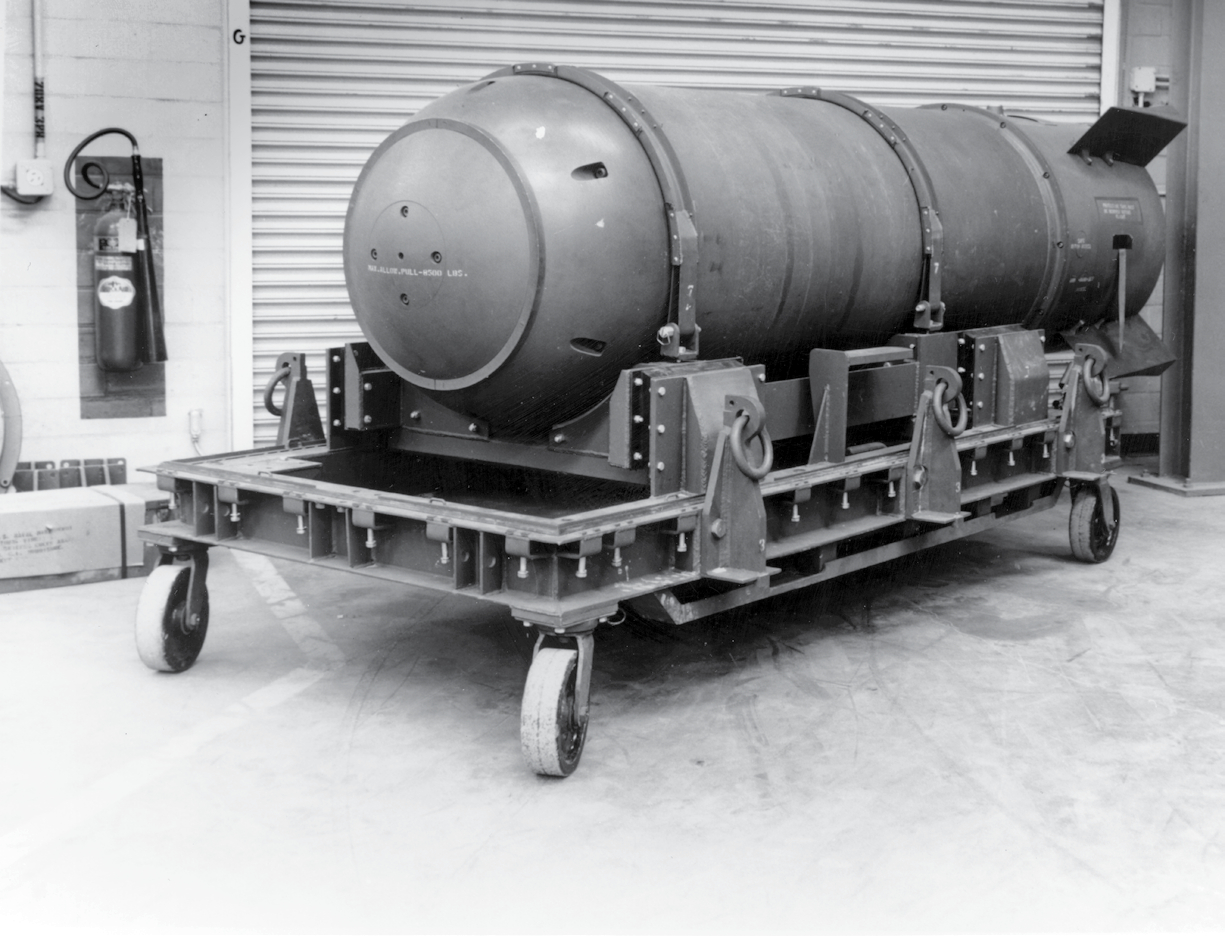
A Mark 15 nuclear weapon in a storage facility

The 3097th Aviation Depot Wing was organized in February 1955 to bring Air Materiel Command's (AMC) units responsible for storing and transporting special weapons under a single headquarters. The five aviation depot groups storing and maintaining nuclear weapons, had been assigned directly to AMC headquarters Each aviation depot group comprised an operations squadron, (Note: Later renumbered as an aviation depot squadron.) a support squadron and a security squadron. (Note: Later redesignated an air police squadron.) The groups maintained the capability to assemble and convoy atomic weapons and provided services and personnel requested by the Atomic Energy Commission (AEC). They maintained weapons received from the AEC for training exercises, maneuvers, and execution of the Emergency War Order. In addition, the groups' security units were responsible for external ground defense support to augment the United States Army as needed.

Nuclear weapons components (capsules) were stored in pressurized M-102 “bird cages,” designed to prevent the nuclear materials from coming in close proximity to each other, which might have initiated a chain reaction. To reduce the chance that the Soviet Union would be able to destroy its bomber fleet with a surprise strike, Strategic Air Command (SAC) began to keep part of its bomber force on armed alert status, and the groups were responsible for custodial transfer of complete weapons or components to SAC combat organizations.

The wing was also assigned three logistic support squadrons which transported special weapons worldwide using C-124 Globemaster II aircraft. These squadrons had been assigned to the air materiel areas commanding the bases at which they were stationed. None of the wing's subordinate units was stationed with the wing. The wing also had a detachment at Kirtland Air Force Base, New Mexico acting as a liaison with AEC offices near Albuquerque, New Mexico. The logistics support squadrons also transported other cargo as required as a secondary mission.

In January 1962, the 28th Logistic Support Squadron at Hill Air Force Base, Utah was transferred to the 1501st Air Transport Wing in a test to see if Military Air Transport Service could perform the special weapons transport mission.

The wing was discontinued on 1 July 1962. Its aviation depot groups and their subordinate squadrons were also discontinued, with the exception of the 3096th Aviation Depot Squadron at Travis Air Force Base, California and the 3097th Aviation Depot Squadron at Westover Air Force Base, Massachusetts, which were reassigned to San Antonio Air Material Area. The logistics support squadrons were assigned to the new 39th Logistics Support Group at Kelly Air Force Base, Texas.

At the same time, the air force stations where the wing's aviation depot groups were stationed were transferred to SAC and merged with the air force bases they abutted or were near to.

== Lineage ==
- Designated and organized on 6 February 1955

Discontinued on 1 July 1962

=== Assignment ===
- Air Materiel Command (later Air Force Logistics Command), 6 February 1955 – 1 July 1962

=== Components ===
Groups

- 3080 Aviation Depot Group, 6 February 1955 – 1 July 1962

Limestone Air Force Station, Maine

- 3081 Aviation Depot Group, 6 February 1955 – 1 July 1962

Rushmore Air Force Station, South Dakota

- 3082 Aviation Depot Group, 6 February 1955 – 1 July 1962

Deep Creek Air Force Station, Washington

- 3083 Aviation Depot Group, 6 February 1955 – 1 July 1962

Fairfield Air Force Station, California

- 3084 Aviation Depot Group, 6 February 1955 – 1 July 1962

Stonybrook Air Force Station, Massachusetts

Squadrons

- 7th Logistic Support Squadron, 6 February 1955 – 1 July 1962

Robins Air Force Base, Georgia

- 19th Logistic Support Squadron, 6 February 1955 – 1 July 1962

Kelly Air Force Base, Texas

- 28th Logistic Support Squadron, 6 February 1955 – 18 January 1962

Hill Air Force Base, Utah

=== Stations ===
- Wright-Patterson Air Force Base, Ohio, 6 February 1955 – 1 July 1962
