= 214th Regiment =

214th Regiment may refer to:

- 214th Aviation Regiment, United States
- 214th Field Artillery Regiment, United States
- 214th Pennsylvania Infantry Regiment, Union Army during the American Civil War

== See also ==
- 214th Division (disambiguation)
- 214th (disambiguation)
