= 214th =

214th may refer to:

- 214th (Saskatchewan) Battalion, CEF, a unit in the Canadian Expeditionary Force during the First World War
- 214th Fires Brigade (United States), an artillery brigade in the United States Army
- 214th Infantry Brigade (United Kingdom), an infantry brigade, fought in Northwestern Europe in World War II
- 214th Infantry Division (Germany), a German division in World War II
- 214th Reconnaissance Group, a group of the United States Air Force located at Davis-Monthan Air Force Base, Arizona
- 214th Reconnaissance Squadron, a unit of the Arizona Air National Guard

== See also ==
- 214 (number)
- 214, the year 214 (CCXIV) of the Julian calendar
- 214 BC
- 214 (disambiguation)
