= 214th Division =

214th Division or 214th Infantry Division may refer to:

- 214th Division (People's Republic of China)
- 214th Infantry Division (Wehrmacht), Germany
- 214th Coastal Division, Italy
- 214th Division (Imperial Japanese Army)
- 214th Rifle Division, Soviet Union

== See also ==
- List of military divisions by number
- 214th Brigade (disambiguation)
- 214th Regiment (disambiguation)
- 214th (disambiguation)
