= C214 =

C214 or variant, may refer to:

- Airborne Climax C2 14, an Australian hanglider
- Ford C-Max C214, a car
- New York City Subway car C214; a crane car, see List of New York City Subway R-type contracts
- C214. Tasmania. Australia; a road, see List of road routes in Tasmania

== See also ==
- 214 (disambiguation)
- C (disambiguation)
