= United States Space Forces – Southern =

US Space Forces - Southern
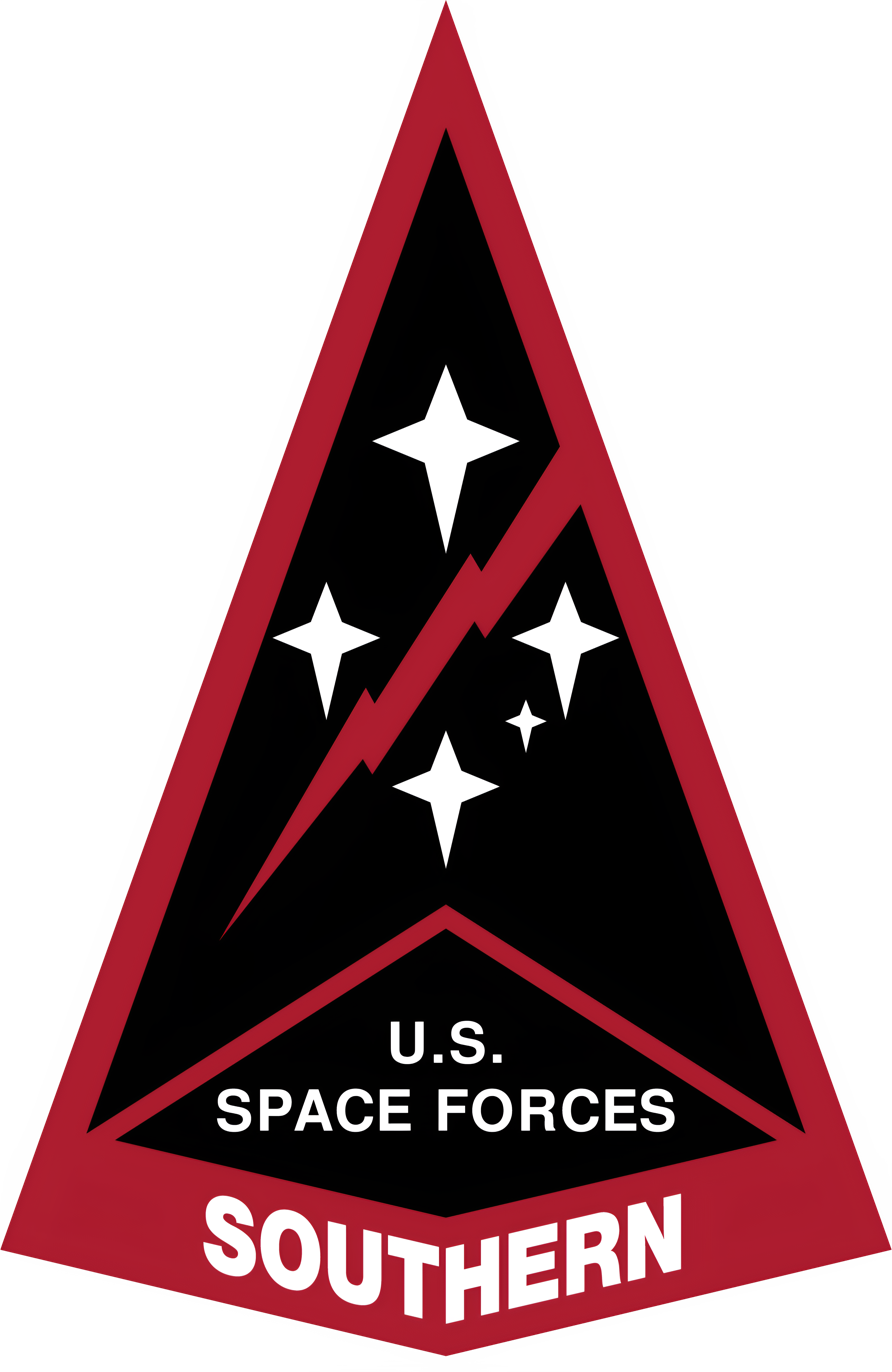
- Active: December 1, 2025 - present
- Country: United States
- Branch: Space Force
- Type: Component field command
- Part of: U.S. Southern Command
- Garrison/HQ: Davis-Monthan Air Force Base

Commanders
- Current commander: Col Brandon P. Alford

United States Space Forces - Southern (SPACEFOR-SOUTH) is a component field command of the United States Space Force stationed at Davis-Monthan Air Force Base in Arizona since its activation on 1 December 2025. SPACEFOR-SOUTH is the space component of the U.S. Southern Command, incorporating space assets with joint, interagency and multinational partners supporting regional security and deterrence across Central America, South America and the Caribbean. The creation of the command gained urgency from the announcement of the Trump administration’s National Security Strategy in November 2025, which places a greater priority on the Western Hemisphere.

The mission of SPACEFOR-SOUTH will focus on expanding space-based capabilities to support multi-domain operations and collaboration of advanced space technology in the region. Space Force Guardians will provide positioning, navigation and timing; and secure satellite communications to support counter trafficking operations, multinational exercises, partner-nation support and crisis response.

== Insignia ==
The brick red arrow shaped insignia contains the southern cross constellation to highlight its focus on South America, with the lightning bolt signifying the speed and responsiveness of “space-enabled support” to joint and partner forces.

== Creation ==
SPACEFOR-SOUTH was officially activated on 1 December 2025 by order of the Secretary of the Air Force, Dr. Troy E. Meink. Subsequently, the formal activation ceremony was held at Davis-Monthan AFB on 12 January 2026.

== List of commanders ==
No.	Commander		Term			Ref
No.	Portrait	Name	Took office	Left office	Duration	Ref
1	Brandon P. Alford	Colonel; Brandon P. Alford (born c. 1978)	1 December 2025	Incumbent	302 days	-
