= Davis–Monthan Air Force Base =

US Air Force base in Arizona, United States

- Tucson, Arizona in United States
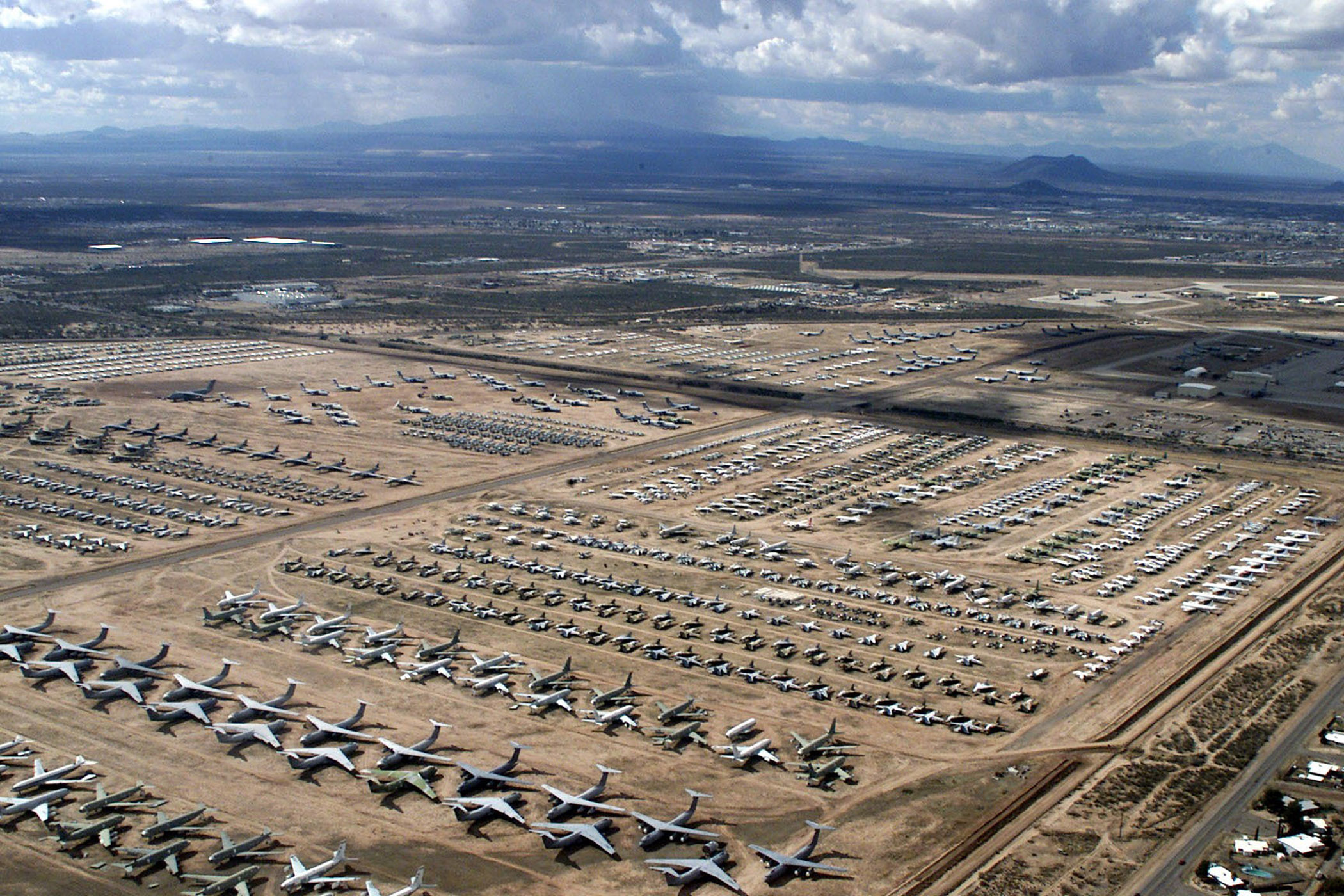
- The 309th Aerospace Maintenance and Regeneration Group's "aircraft boneyard" located at Davis–Monthan AFB

Site information
- Type: US Air Force base
- Owner: Department of Defense
- Operator: US Air Force
- Controlled by: Air Combat Command (ACC)
- Condition: Operational
- Website: www.dm.af.mil

Location
- Location within North America Location within the United States Location within Arizona
- Coordinates: 32°09′49″N 110°50′58″W

Site history
- Built: 1925 (as Davis–Monthan Landing Field)
- In use: 1940–present

Garrison information
- Current commander: Colonel Scott C. Mills
- Garrison: 355th Wing (host); 55th Electronic Combat Group; 214th Attack Group; 309th Aerospace Maintenance and Regeneration Group; 943rd Rescue Group
- Occupants: 41st Electronic Combat Squadron; 42nd Electronic Combat Squadron; 43rd Electronic Combat Squadron; 55th Rescue Squadron; 79th Rescue Squadron; 214th Attack Squadron; 305th Rescue Squadron; 354th Fighter Squadron; 357th Fighter Squadron; 418th Test and Evaluation Squadron; 556th Test and Evaluation Squadron; See Based units section for full list.

Airfield information
- Identifiers: IATA: DMA, ICAO: KDMA, FAA LID: DMA, WMO: 722745
- Elevation: 824.2 metres (2,704 ft) AMSL
Runways
Direction	Length and surface
13/31	4,159 metres (13,645 ft) PEM

Davis–Monthan Air Force Base (DM AFB) (IATA: DMA, ICAO: KDMA, FAA LID: DMA) is a United States Air Force base 5 miles (4 nmi; 8 km) southeast of downtown Tucson, Arizona. It was established in 1925 as Davis–Monthan Landing Field. The host unit for Davis–Monthan AFB is the 355th Wing (355 WG) assigned to Twelfth Air Force (12AF), part of Air Combat Command (ACC). The base is best known as the location of the Air Force Materiel Command's 309th Aerospace Maintenance and Regeneration Group (309 AMARG), the aircraft graveyard for all excess military and U.S. government aircraft and aerospace vehicles.

The 355th is ACC's executive agent for INF and START treaty compliance. In October 2018, the 563rd Rescue Group, previously a geographically separated unit of the 23rd Wing at Moody AFB, Georgia, was transferred to the 355th Wing, along with its HC-130J Combat King II and HH-60G Pave Hawk aircraft.

One of the wing's tenant units, the 55th Electronic Combat Group (55 ECG), is a geographically separated unit (GSU) of the 55th Wing (55 WG) at Offutt AFB, Nebraska. Tasked to provide offensive counter-information and electronic attack capabilities in support of U.S. and coalition tactical air, surface, and special operations forces, the 55 ECG unit employs its EA-37B Compass Call aircraft worldwide in tactical air operations in war and other contingencies. It also provides initial and recurrent training to all EA-37B Compass Call pilots, navigators, electronic warfare officers, and aircrew.

Two other major tenant units are assigned to the AFRC. The 943rd Rescue Group (structured as a GSU under AFRC's 920th Rescue Wing at Patrick Space Force Base is equipped with HH-60G Pave Hawk helicopters and Guardian Angel personnel. The 943 RQG is tasked to provide combat search-and-rescue and personnel recovery support worldwide.

Perhaps the most prominent tenant is the 309th Aerospace Maintenance and Regeneration Group (309 AMARG) of the Air Force Materiel Command (AFMC). As the main location for the 309 AMARG, Davis–Monthan AFB is the sole aircraft boneyard for excess military and U.S. government aircraft and other aerospace vehicles such as ballistic missiles. Tucson's dry climate and alkaline soil make it an ideal location to store and preserve aircraft; more than 4,000 military aircraft are parked on the base.

== History ==
=== Namesakes ===
The base was named in honor of World War I pilots Lieutenants Samuel H. Davis (1896–1921) and Chief Engineer Oscar Monthan (1885–1924), both Tucson natives. Monthan enlisted in the Army as a private in 1917, was commissioned as a ground officer in 1918, and later became a pilot; he was killed in the crash of a Martin B2 bomber in Hawaii on 27 March 1924.

First Lieutenant Samuel Howard Davis (20 November 1896 – 28 December 1921) was a pilot and United States Army Air Service officer. Born to Sam and Effie Davis in 1896 in Dyer County, Tennessee, Davis was known by his middle name, Howard. He attended public schools in Tucson. As a young man, his hobbies included horseback riding and shooting; he was a good marksman.

Davis enrolled at A&M College of Texas in 1915 as a student of mechanical engineering, having previously attended the University of Arizona in Tucson. After enlisting in the military in 1917, he was briefly assigned to Fort Huachuca in Arizona before being transferred to College Station, Texas, to complete his academic studies. He returned to the military after graduation in 1918, assembling airplanes at Kelly Field in San Antonio, Texas. He trained pilots during the first World War, including some pilots who took down German planes. He reached the rank of second lieutenant. Davis was honorably discharged from the military about 1919 with the rank of First Lieutenant in the reserve corps. For a time he worked commercial aviation as a manager with the Arizona Aviation Company, where he piloted Orioles and standard-manufacture airplanes. Davis married Marjorie Cameron of San Antonio in 1920.

Davis returned to the Army Air Service in August 1921. He died in a military aircraft accident completing a training mission on 28 December 1921, while a passenger in a Curtiss JN-6HG at Carlstrom Field, near Arcadia, Florida. One other person, William C. Sinclair, was also killed. They were hunting ducks at the time; Sinclair was piloting and Davis was shooting. After a funeral at the home of his parents, Davis was buried at Evergreen Cemetery in Tucson. He was survived by his widow, his parents, and a brother, Wilton.

Davis's father was in attendance at the 1925 dedication of the base, as was Governor G.W.P. Hunt, who spoke at the dedication.

=== Origins ===
In 1919, the Tucson Chamber of Commerce aviation committee established the nation's first municipally owned airfield at the current site of the Tucson Rodeo Grounds. The rapid increase in aviation activities meant a move in 1927 to the site which is now Davis–Monthan Air Force Base. The City of Tucson acquired land southeast of town for a runway and dedicated the field in 1925. Charles Lindbergh, fresh from his nonstop crossing of the Atlantic Ocean, flew his Spirit of St. Louis to Tucson in 1927 to dedicate the airport at Davis–Monthan Field, then the largest municipal airport in the United States.

Military presence at the field began when Sergeant Simpson relocated his fuel and service operation to the site on 6 October 1927. He kept a log containing names of the field's customers, including Lindbergh, Amelia Earhart, Benjamin Foulois, and Jimmy Doolittle. Doolittle, awarded the Medal of Honor for his 1942 Tokyo raid, was the first military customer at the field on 9 October 1927. The combination of civil and military operations worked well until the early 1940s, when military requirements began to require the relocation of civil-aviation activities.

=== World War II ===
Davis–Monthan Airport became Tucson Army Air Field in 1940, as the United States prepared for World War II. The first assigned U.S. Army Air Corps units were the 1st Bomb Wing, 41st Bomb Group, and 31st Air Base Group, activating on 30 April 1941 with Lieutenant Colonel Ames S. Albro Sr. as commanding officer. In its military role, the base became known as Davis–Monthan Army Air Field on 3 December 1941. U.S. Army Air Forces leaders then used the airfield for heavy bomber operation, sending Douglas B-18 Bolo, Consolidated B-24 Liberator, and Boeing B-29 Superfortress bombers, for training and observation missions.

Among the bombardment groups trained at the base during the war were:

- 34th Bombardment (Heavy) 13 May – 4 July 1942
- 94th Bombardment (Heavy) August – 1 November 1942
- 302nd Bombardment (Heavy) 23 June – 30 July 1942
- 308th Bombardment (Heavy) 20 June – 1 October 1942
- 380th Bombardment (Heavy) 4 November – 2 December 1942
- 382nd Bombardment (Heavy) 23 January – 5 April 1943
- 389th Bombardment (Heavy) 24 December 1942 – 1 February 1943
- 392nd Bombardment (Heavy) 26 January – 1 March 1943
- 399th Bombardment (Heavy) 1 March – 10 April 1943
- 400th Bombardment (Heavy) April – 2 May 1943
- 446th Bombardment (Heavy) 1 April – 8 June 1943
- 449th Bombardment (Heavy) 1 May – 5 July 1943
- 451st Bombardment (Heavy) 1 May – 3 June 1943
- 459th Bombardment (Heavy) 20 September – 1 November 1943
- 466th Bombardment (Heavy) 15 August – 17 October 1945
- 486th Bombardment (Heavy) 9 November 1943 – March 1944
- 489th Bombardment (Heavy) 3 April – 13 July 1945
- 491st Bombardment (Heavy) 1 October – 11 November 1943
- 444th Bombardment (Very Heavy) 1 March – 29 July 1943
- 499th Bombardment (Very Heavy) 20 November – 1 December 1943

Training at the airfield came to a halt on 14 August 1945, when the Japanese surrendered. Davis–Monthan played a postwar role by housing German prisoners of war from June 1945 to March 1946. It also served as a separation center, which brought the base populace to a high of 11,614 in September 1945.

With the end of the war, operations at the base came to a virtual standstill. Then, the base was selected as a storage site for hundreds of decommissioned aircraft, with the activation of the 4105th Army Air Force Unit, which oversaw the storage of excess B-29s and C-47 "Gooney Birds". Tucson's low humidity and alkaline soil made it an ideal location for aircraft storage and preservation, awaiting cannibalization or possible reuse, a mission that has continued to this day.

=== Strategic Air Command ===
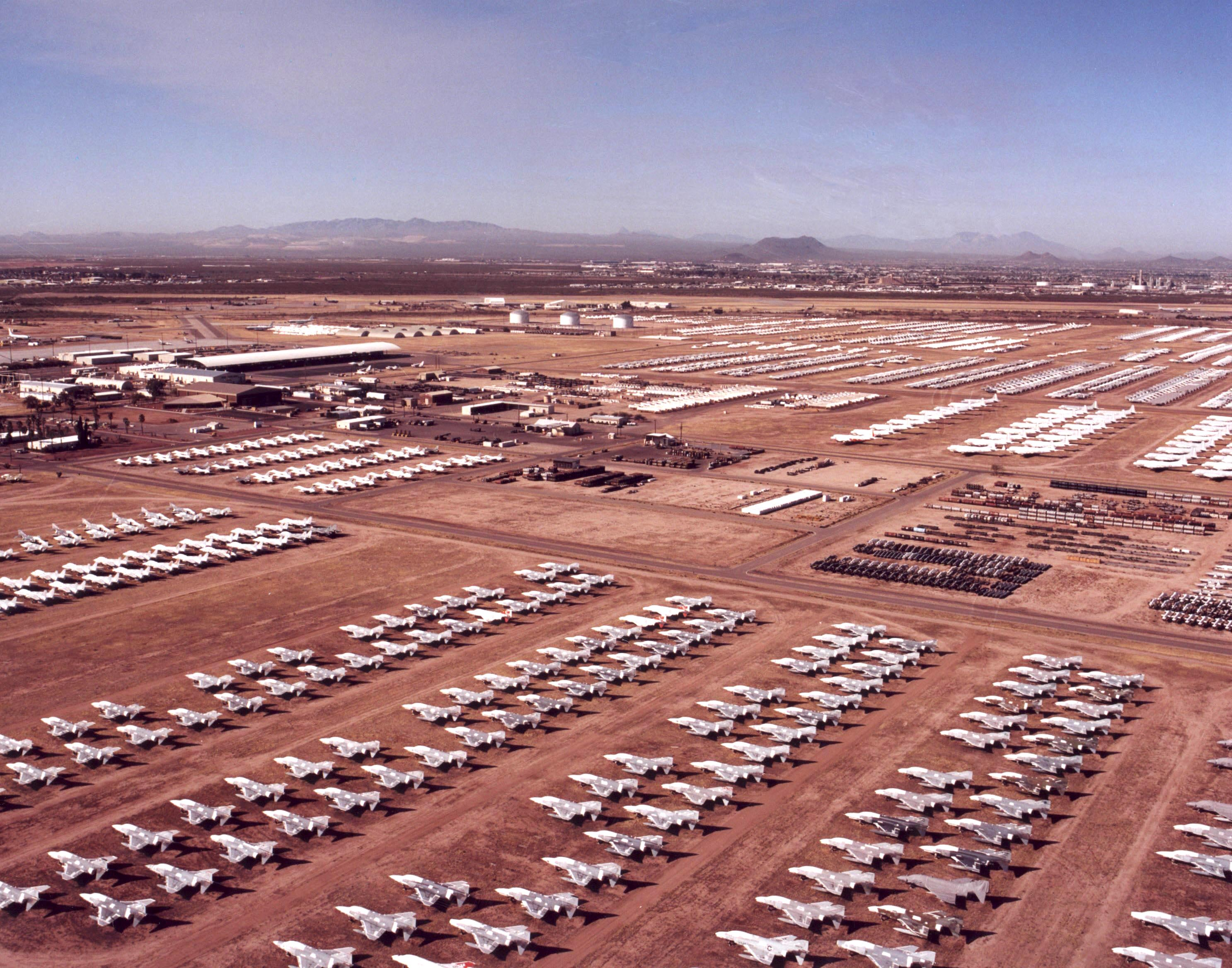
Aircraft Maintenance and Regeneration Group (AMARG) boneyard at Davis–Monthan Air Force Base

The Cold War era was ushered in at Davis–Monthan on 21 March 1946, with the installation placed under the claimancy of the recently established Strategic Air Command (SAC), whose presence at the base began in the form of the 40th and 444th Bombardment Groups, both equipped with B-29s. As part of the postwar austerity, these groups were later inactivated, with the personnel and equipment being consolidated into the 43d Bombardment Group in October. On 11 January 1948, with the establishment of the United States Air Force as independent service four months earlier, the facility was renamed Davis–Monthan Air Force Base. On 30 June 1948, the Air Force activated the 43rd Air Refueling Squadron, whose KB-29Ms were newly equipped with aerial refueling equipment purchased from the British firm FRL. The 43rd ARS, along with the 509th ARS at Walker AFB, New Mexico, was the first dedicated air refueling unit in history.

On 2 March 1949, the Lucky Lady II, a B-50A of the 43d Bombardment Wing, completed the first nonstop round-the-world flight, having covered 23,452 miles (37,742 km) in 94 hours and 1 minute (249.45 mph). Lucky Lady II was refueled four times in the air by KB-29 tankers of the 43d Air Refueling Squadron, which had made only one operational air refueling contact before the mission. For this outstanding flight, the Lucky Lady II's crew received the Mackay Trophy, given annually by the National Aeronautic Association for the outstanding flight of the year, and the Air Age Trophy, an Air Force Association award, given each year in recognition of significant contributions to the public understanding of the air age.

In 1953, the jet age came to Davis–Monthan when SAC units on the base converted to the new Boeing B-47 Stratojet. The 303d Bombardment Wing, Medium, was initially established on 27 August 1951, and activated at Davis–Monthan AFB on 4 September 1951. The wing operated B-29s until January 1952, when it was equipped with KB-29s. On 20 January 1953, the 303d transitioned to the Boeing B-47 Stratojet for its three bomb squadrons, while an additional air refueling squadron equipped with KC-97s was assigned to the wing between 18 February 1953, and 1 February 1956. A standard SAC Alert Area ramp was constructed in the southeast corner of the base adjacent to the runway and the 303d assumed nuclear alert responsibilities when final conversion and checkout in the B-47 was complete.

In April 1953, the Air Defense Command's 15th Fighter-Interceptor Squadron was activated with F-86A Sabres. A year later, the unit transitioned into F-86Ds followed by a transition to F-86Ls in the fall of 1957. In the spring of 1959, the unit received Northrop F-89J interceptors which it flew for only a year when it transitioned into McDonnell F-101Bs. On 24 December 1964, the 15th FIS was inactivated.

In 1962, SAC's 390th Strategic Missile Wing (390 SMW) and its 18 Titan II ICBM sites around Tucson were activated. The 390 SMW was one of only three Titan II missile wings in SAC and represented the heaviest land-based missile and the largest single warhead ever fielded by U.S. strategic deterrent forces.

In July 1963, the 4028th Strategic Reconnaissance Weather Wing, equipped with U-2 strategic reconnaissance aircraft, began flying global missions from Davis–Monthan. Following the Cuban missile crisis in 1963, the 4080th Strategic Reconnaissance Wing at Laughlin AFB, Texas, relocated to the base and assumed responsibility for all U-2 operations, emphasizing long-range strategic reconnaissance and intelligence collection. As a SAC unit, the 4080th was later redesignated the 100th Strategic Reconnaissance Wing and also acquired Lockheed DC-130 Hercules aircraft for launch and control of Firebee reconnaissance drones that were the precursors of contemporary unmanned aerial systems. The DC-130s and U-2s remained at the Davis–Monthan until 1976, when the 100 SRW was inactivated, its DC-130s transferred to Tactical Air Command's 432d Tactical Drone Group, and its U-2s transferred to SAC's 9th Strategic Reconnaissance Wing at Beale Air Force Base, California, where U-2 Dragon Lady operations were consolidated with SR-71 Blackbird operations.

On 15 June 1964, Davis–Monthan's 303d Bombardment Wing was inactivated as part of the retirement of the B-47 Stratojet from active service. The year 1964 brought back the combat crew training mission of the World War II years with the 4453d Combat Crew Training Wing of the Tactical Air Command (TAC) equipped with the Air Force's newest and most sophisticated fighter, the McDonnell Douglas F-4 Phantom II. In July 1971, the 355th Tactical Fighter Wing, flying the A-7 Corsair II aircraft, was activated at the base and the previously assigned F-4s were moved to Luke AFB, near Phoenix, Arizona.

=== Tactical Air Command ===
On 1 October 1976, the base was transferred to TAC after 30 years under SAC, with SAC's 390th Strategic Missile Wing becoming a tenant command of the base. Also that year, the 355th Tactical Fighter Wing accepted the first A-10 Thunderbolt II. Since 1979, D–M has been the training location for pilots in the A-10; the base was redesignated the 355th Tactical Training Wing on 1 September 1979. The organization was later redesignated the 355th Fighter Wing since it includes operational, deployable A-10 squadrons in addition to its CONUS training mission

The 1980s brought several diverse missions to D–M. The headquarters charged with overseeing them was now the 836th Air Division, which was activated 1 January 1981. The AD advised Air Force component commanders and land forces on A-10 aircraft tactics, training, employment and readiness, and subordinate units participated in exercises such as Red Flag and Celtic Echo.

The 41st Electronic Combat Squadron equipped with the EC-130H Compass Call aircraft, arrived on 1 July 1980, and reported to the 552d Airborne Warning and Control Wing. In 1981 D–M welcomed the 868th Tactical Missile Training Group (866 TMTG). The 868th was the only U.S.-based Ground Launched Cruise Missile (GLCM) unit and the source of the crews that staffed the forward deployed GLCM wings in NATO in 1982.

On 1 September 1982, the headquarters of the 602d Tactical Air Control Wing and its subordinate 23rd Tactical Air Support Squadron (TASS), a unit responsible for the Air Force's tactical air control system west of the Mississippi River transferred from Bergstrom Air Force Base, Texas, and stood up at D–M, bringing 16 OA-37B aircraft and numerous new personnel to the base. The 23rd TASS became the Air Force's first O/A-10 squadron in 1988, providing heavily armed airborne forward-air-control capability for the first time. Unlike all other D–M aircraft at the time, the 23rd TASS fleet's tail flash read "NF", for "Nail FAC"; the squadron's radio call sign was "Nail".

In 1984, as a result of the first series of Strategic Arms Reduction Treaties START I between the United States and the Soviet Union, SAC began to decommission its Titan II missile system. In 1982, the 390 SMW began removing its 18 missiles and inactivating the associated sites in preparation for eventual demolition.

In October 1981, President Ronald Reagan announced that as part of the strategic modernization program, Titan II systems were to be retired by 1 October 1987. Deactivation began at Davis–Monthan on 1 October 1982. During the operation, titled "Rivet Cap", the missiles were removed and shipped to Norton AFB, California, for refurbishment and storage. Explosive demolition began at the headworks of missile complex 570–7 on 30 November 1983. In May 1984, the 390 SMW's last Titan II at Davis–Monthan came off alert status. SAC subsequently inactivated the 390th Strategic Missile Wing on 30 June 1984.

One site under the 390 SMW, known both as Titan II Site 571-7 and as Air Force Facility Missile Site 8, was initially decommissioned in 1982. Located about 12 miles (19 km) south of Tucson in Sahuarita, Arizona, it was saved from demolition and turned over to the Arizona Aerospace Foundation, a nonprofit organization that also administers the Pima Air and Space Museum immediately south of Davis–Monthan AFB. With a variety of items on loan from the National Museum of the United States Air Force, including an inert Titan II missile, Site 571-7 is now known as the Titan Missile Museum and is one of two remaining examples of a Titan II missile site in existence (the other being located at Vandenberg Space Force Base, California, site 395-C). In 1994, the site was declared a National Historic Landmark.

In 1987, the 71st Special Operations Squadron, an Air Force Reserve unit flying HH-3 Jolly Green Giants, was activated at the base. While it served after the invasion of Kuwait in Desert Shield/Storm, it did not survive the end of the Cold War drawdown, and disbanded in 1992.

=== After the Cold War era ===
In the 1990s, the 355 TTW continued to train A-10 crews for assignments to units in the United States, England, and Korea. During this period, the 602nd Tactical Air Control Wing deployed airborne forward air controllers in their OA-10 aircraft to Operation Desert Storm, providing nearly 100% of this capability to the war.

On 1 October 1991, the 355 TTW was redesignated as the 355th Fighter Wing (355 FW) in tune with the Air Force's Objective Wing philosophy. The 355 FW was composed of the 355th Operations Group, the 355th Maintenance Group, the 355th Medical Group, and the 355th Mission Support Group.

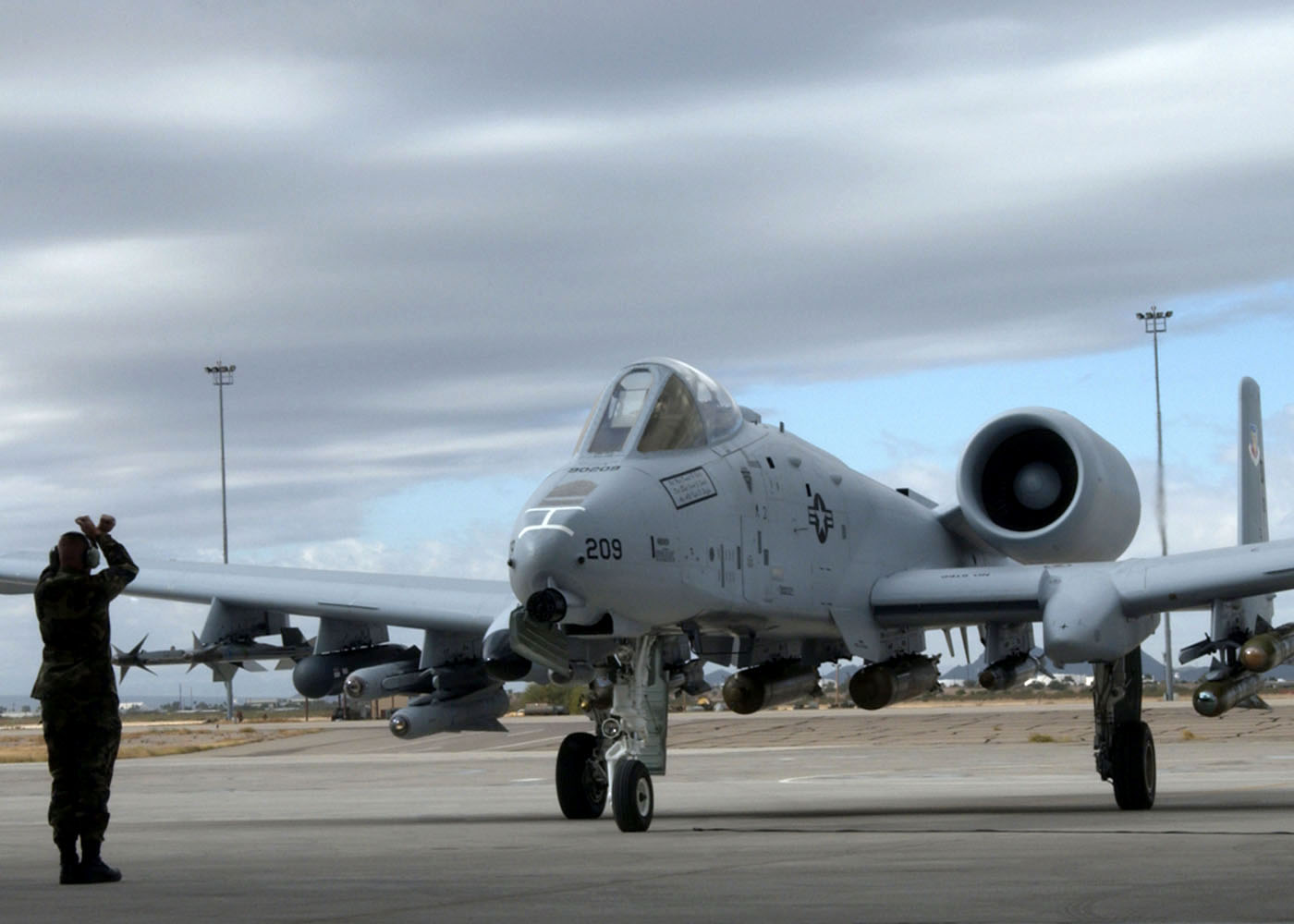
A newly modified A-10C Thunderbolt II taxied into Davis–Monthan AFB.

In May 1992, the 41st and 43d Electronic Combat Squadrons, flying the EC-130H Hercules Compass Call arrived. The aircraft carried an airborne battlefield command and control center capsule that provides continuous control of tactical air operations in the forward battle area and behind enemy lines. This capability added yet more strength to the wing's combat capability. The 43rd Electronic Combat Squadron "Bats" are part of the 55th Wing at Offutt AFB, Nebraska, but operate out of Davis–Monthan. In addition, the 42d Airborne Command and Control Squadron arrived from Keesler AFB, Mississippi, on 19 July 1994.

On 1 May 1992, senior Air Force leaders implemented the policy of one base, one wing, one boss. The 836 AD and 602 TAIRCW inactivated (the later on 15 June 1992), while the 41 ECS and 43 ECS came under control of the 355 FW. With the mission diversified, the 355th FW was redesignated as the 355th Wing (355 WG).

=== Air Combat Command ===
On 1 June 1992, Tactical Air Command was inactivated and all aircraft, personnel, and installations previously under TAC were transferred to the newly established Air Combat Command on the same date. Following Operation Desert Storm, the 355 WG supported Operation Southern Watch during deployments to Al Jaber, Kuwait, in 1997 by deploying 24 A-10s, in 1998 by deploying 16 A-10s, and in 1999 by deploying 14 A-10s, all to ensure compliance of the 33rd parallel southern no-fly zone. The flight and mysterious crash of Captain Craig D. Button took off from Davis–Monthan Air Force Base on 12 April 1997.

=== Global War on Terrorism, 2001–2007 ===
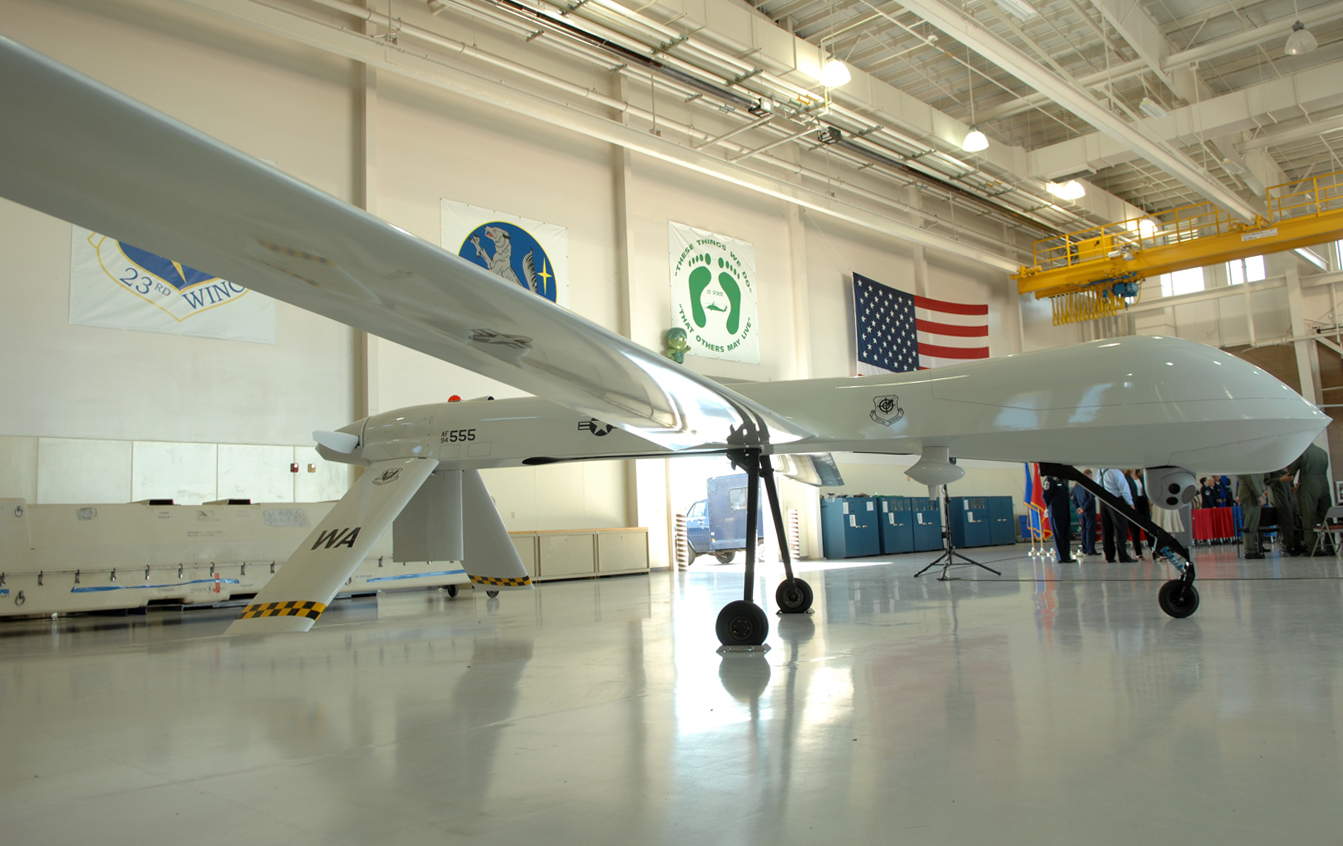
One of the 214th Reconnaissance Group's General Atomics MQ-1B Predator UAV aircraft (AF Serial No. 04-0555)

The attacks on 11 September 2001, led to the initiation of three ongoing missions: Operation Enduring Freedom (OEF), Operation Iraqi Freedom (OIF), and Operation Noble Eagle (ONE). After Operation Enduring Freedom, eight A-10s from the 355 WG were called to Bagram Airfield, Afghanistan, to fly close air support missions supporting multinational ground forces.

In September 2002, the 48th, 55th, and the 79th Rescue Squadron's (RQS) transferred under control of the 355 WG, equipped with HC-130 aircraft and HH-60 helicopters. At the same time, the 41st and 43d Electronic Combat Squadrons were realigned under the control of the 55th Electronic Combat Group (55 ECG). While personnel and aircraft remained on Davis–Monthan AFB, operational control of the 55 ECG was assumed by the 55th Wing at Offutt AFB, Nebraska. Another major wing realignment occurred on 1 October 2003, with the activation of the 563rd Rescue Group (563 RQG) on Davis–Monthan AFB. Control of the 48th, 55th, and 79th RQSs was passed to the new group with the 23rd Wing at Moody Air Force Base, Georgia, assuming operational command of the unit.

In 2003 and 2005, the 354th Fighter Squadron (354 FS) "Bulldogs" deployed on five-month deployments to Bagram Airfield in Afghanistan. During these deployments, they provided 24-hour presence to reassure the Afghan population as it struggled with its emergent democracy, and provided key support during national elections. While the 2003 deployment saw limited action, the Bulldogs employed over 22,000 rounds of 30 mm during 130 troops-in-contact situations during the 2005 deployment. Returning to Afghanistan in April 2007 for another six-month deployment, the 345th again provided 24-hour presence and Close Air Support expertise to coalition forces in support of Operation Enduring Freedom. During this period, insurgent activity level was the highest recorded to date in OEF. The Bulldogs employed an unprecedented number of munitions during this deployment: over 150,000 rounds of 30 mm in support of over 400 troops-in-contact situations.

=== 2007–present ===
On 26 April 2007, the 355th Wing was redesignated as the 355th Fighter Wing (355 FW) with only A-10 fighter aircraft assigned. Also in 2007, the 214th Reconnaissance Group (214 RG), an Arizona Air National Guard unit, was activated. As of October 2020, the 355 FW is composed of four groups, the 355th Operations Group (355 OG), the 355th Maintenance Group (355 MG), the 355th Mission Support Group (355 MSG), and the 355th Medical Group (355 MDG). Along with their tenant organizations, they make up the 6,100 airmen and 1,700 civilian personnel at Davis–Monthan AFB. The 355th Fighter Wing was re-designated 355th Wing on 2 January 2019. On 20 August 2020, the 355th Wing again realigned and now falls under the 15th Air Force Headquarters at Shaw AFB, SC.

The 924 Fighter Group of the Air Force Reserve Command (AFRC) was reactivated in 2011 and initially assigned to Davis–Monthan AFB as an "associate" unit to the 355 FW flying the A-10 aircraft. As part of the Air Force Reserve Command, it is also a geographically separated unit (GSU) of AFRC's 944th Fighter Wing (944 FW) at Luke AFB, Arizona. Like the 355 FW, the 924 FG currently flies the same Fairchild Republic A-10 Thunderbolt II close air support aircraft. The 924 FG consists of the 47th Fighter Squadron (A-10C), 924th Maintenance Squadron, 924th Operational Support Flight.

Between October 2013 and March 2014, the 924 FG transitioned from being a "classic" associate unit when it gained 28 A-10 aircraft of its own from Barksdale AFB, Louisiana. The 924th is now part of the Total Force Enterprise, and is the only unit-equipped both active and classic associate fighter group in Air Force Reserve Command's inventory. With oversight of the 47th Fighter Squadron, 924th MS, and 924th OSF, the group is charged with working with the Regular Air Force's 355th Fighter Wing to functionally integrate with the 355th Operations Group and 355th Maintenance Group to conduct A-10 pilot training at Davis–Monthan AFB. The group was inactivated on 6 September 2025 as part of the wider drawdown of the USAF's A-10 fleet.

On 1 October 2021, the 418th Test and Evaluation Squadron was activated at Davis-Monthan to provide test and evaluation of new tactics, techniques and procedures for the EC-130H Compass Call and HC-130J Combat King II.

On 29 July 2026, the 355th's 357th Fighter Squadron conducted the wing's final A-10 flight, which marked the end of 50 years of operations of the type at Davis–Monthan AFB. A ceremony on 18 September 2026 marked the official end of all A-10 operations at Davis-Monthan, which included a twin flyover by the aircraft. Four A-10 squadrons have formally been inactivated at Davis-Monthan: the 355th Operations Group, the 357th Fighter Squadron, the 357th Fighter Generation Squadron, and the 355th Training Squadron.

== Role and operations ==
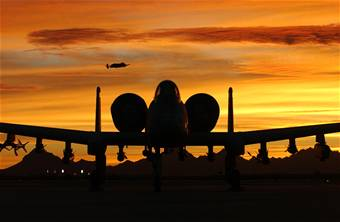
An A-10 in the Arizona sunset

=== 355th Wing ===
The host wing at Davis–Monthan is the 355th Wing, which includes:

- 355th Operations Group (355 OG)

The 355 OG consists of six squadrons and over 450 personnel and an AN/TPS-75 radar system. It provides war-fighters with forces for close air support (CAS), air interdiction (AI), forward air control (FAC), combat search and rescue (CSAR), ground-based tactical air control, and airbase operations. It also conducts all formal course directed aircraft initial qualification/ re-qualification training. All active duty aircraft assigned to Davis–Monthan Air Force Base carry the tail code "DM".

- 354th Fighter Squadron (A-10C) "Bulldogs", blue tail flash (inactivated 13 September 2024)
- 357th Fighter Squadron (A-10C) "Dragons", yellow tail flash (inactivated 18 September 2026)
- 358th Fighter Squadron (A-10C) "Lobos", black tail flash (inactivated 21 February 2014)
- 355th Operations Support Squadron
- 355th Training Squadron
- 607th Air Control Squadron
- 355th Mission Support Group (355 MSG) – The 355 MSG consists of about 2,000 military and civilian personnel in six diverse squadrons that train, equip and provide agile combat mission support, including civil engineering, communications, contracting, transportation, fuels, supply, deployment readiness, personnel, security forces, and services for immediate worldwide deployment of combat support elements. The group also provides an effective in-garrison support infrastructure and quality of life services for 26 wing and 32 associate units spanning a 60,000-person, 10,763-acre (43.56 km^{2}) community, one of the largest in Air Combat Command.
- 355th Maintenance Group (355 MXG) – The 355 MXG supports the wing's flying squadrons, providing organizational and intermediate field level/back shop maintenance and intermediate field level/back shop maintenance for EA-37B Compass Call, 8 HH-60G, and 6 HC-130J combat-ready aircraft. The 355 MXG has over 1,700 assigned personnel, ensures quality of on- and off-equipment aircraft maintenance, and executes an annual O&M budget of $72.2M.
  - 355th Aircraft Maintenance Squadron
  - 355th Component Maintenance Squadron
  - 355th Equipment Maintenance Squadron
- 355th Medical Group (355 MDG) – The 355th Medical Group was established in 1955 as the 355th USAF Infirmary at McGhee Tyson AFB, Tennessee. After several redesignations, it was activated at Davis–Monthan AFB as the 355th Medical Group in 1992. The 355th Medical Group ensures combat medical readiness of all operational and support units home-based at Davis–Monthan AFB for global contingencies. With an authorized staff of 407 and a resource allocation totaling $26 million, the 355 MDG ensures that warriors at Davis–Monthan AFB are medically fit-to-fight. In addition to training and equipping/manning 25 mobility teams, the 355 MDG also promotes the health and wellness of the Davis–Monthan AFB community by meeting the health care needs of over 54,000 eligible DoD beneficiaries in southern Arizona.

==== 563rd Rescue Group ====
The 563rd Rescue Group is part of the 355th Wing. It includes the following squadrons:

- 48th Rescue Squadron (Pararescue)
- 55th Rescue Squadron (HH-60G Pavehawk)
- 79th Rescue Squadron (HC-130J)
- 563rd Operations Support Squadron
- 563rd Maintenance Squadron
- 923rd Aircraft Maintenance Squadron

=== Tenant units ===
==== Twelfth Air Force ====
Davis–Monthan is headquarters of Air Combat Command's Twelfth Air Force and the 612th Air and Space Operations Center which operates AFSOUTH's Combined Air and Space Operations Center (CAOC). Other Direct Report Units include the 612th Air Communications Squadron.

55th Electronic Combat Group

- 55th Electronic Combat Group, a geographically separated unit (GSU) of the 55th Wing at Offutt Air Force Base, Nebraska
  - 41st Electronic Combat Squadron
  - 42d Electronic Combat Squadron
  - 43d Electronic Combat Squadron (EA-37B) "Bats", red tail stripe
  - 755th Operations Support Squadron
  - 755th Aircraft Maintenance Squadron

==== 309th Aerospace Maintenance and Regeneration Group (AMARG) ====
The 309th Aerospace Maintenance and Regeneration Group (AMARG) is part of Air Force Materiel Command and is responsible for the base's aircraft "graveyard", the largest in terms of number of planes in the world, where old military and other aircraft are stationed either to be stored indefinitely, demilitarized for museum or monument display, stripped and pulped/recycled, or restored for service.

943rd Rescue Group

- The 943rd Rescue Group is an Air Force Reserve Command unit assigned to Davis–Monthan that falls under the 920th Rescue Wing (920 RQW) at Patrick Space Force Base, Florida The group comprises the following units.
  - 305th Rescue Squadron (HH-60G)
  - 306th Rescue Squadron (Pararescue)
  - 943rd Aircraft Maintenance Squadron
  - 943rd Aerospace Medicine Squadron
  - 943rd Operations Support Flight

==== Arizona Air National Guard ====
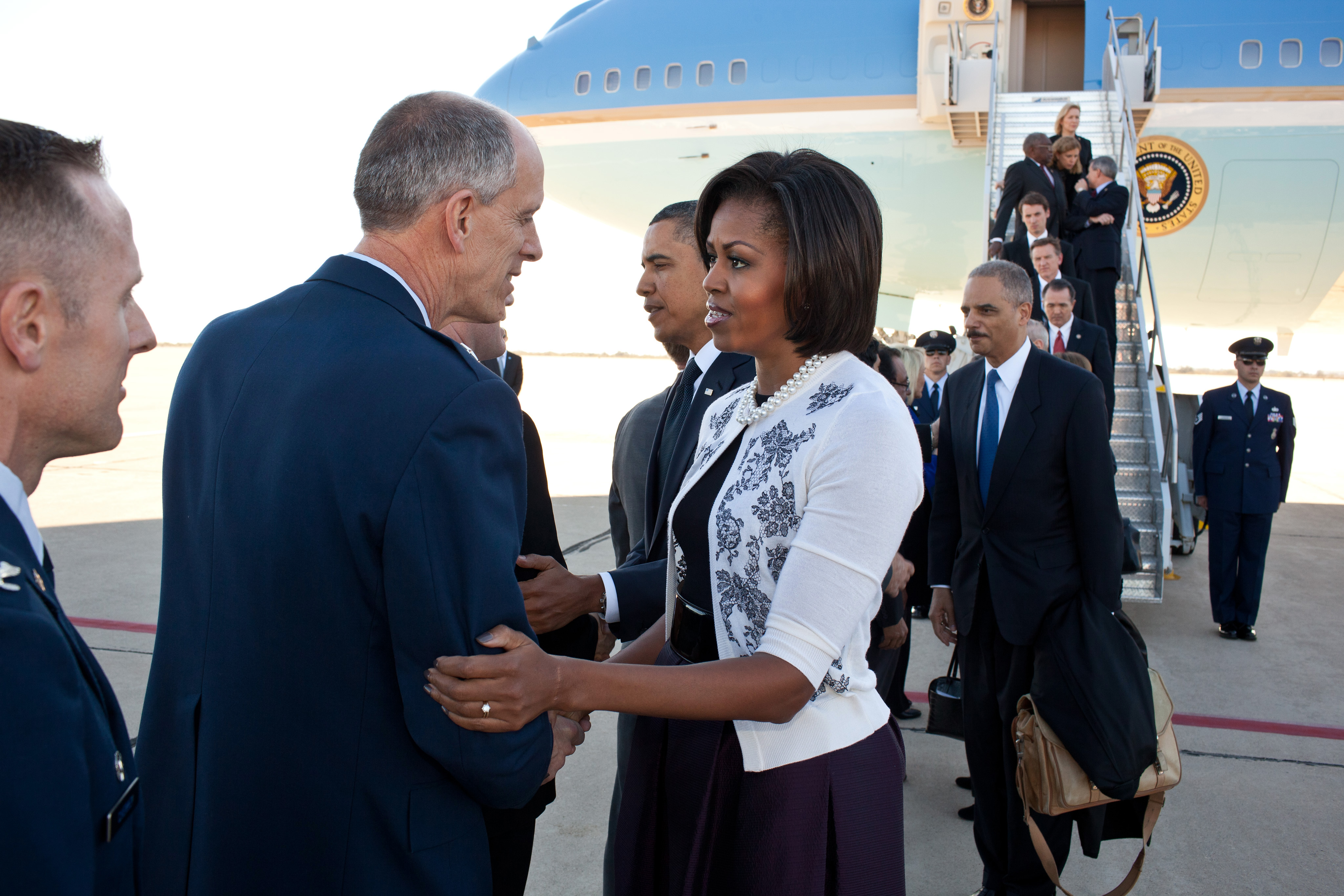
Air Force One arrives at the base with President Barack Obama during a 2011 visit to Tucson.

The base provides additional active duty support to the 162d Fighter Wing (162 FW) of the Arizona Air National Guard and the Air National Guard Air Force Reserve Command Test Center, both located at Tucson Air National Guard Base at nearby Tucson International Airport, and both of which fly the F-16C and F-16D Fighting Falcon.

The 214th Attack Group (214 RG) of the Arizona Air National Guard previously operated the MQ-1 Predator and currently flies the MQ-9 Reaper in a split operation, with remote piloting/command & control activities at Davis-Monthan AFB and aircraft launch, recovery and maintenance activities taking place at Libby Army Airfield.

==== Other activities ====
Also located on base is the 25th Operational Weather Squadron 25 OWS. The squadron produces forecasts for the Western United States and is part of the 1st Weather Group (1 WXG) headquartered at Offutt Air Force Base, Neb. The squadron also serves as a training hub for new weather professionals, both enlisted and officers.

Other military activities and federal agencies using the base include the Navy Operational Support Center Tucson, a detachment of the Naval Air Systems Command, the Federal Aviation Administration, the U.S. Customs and Border Protection Air and Marine Operations Tucson Air Branch, and the U.S. Army Corps of Engineers.

== Based units ==
Flying and notable non-flying units based at Davis–Monthan Air Force Base.

Units marked GSU are Geographically Separate Units, which although based at Davis–Monthan, are subordinate to a parent unit based at another location.

=== United States Air Force ===
Air Combat Command (ACC)

- Twelfth Air Force
  - Headquarters Twelfth Air Force
  - 612th Air and Space Operations Center
  - 612th Air Communications Squadron
- Fifteenth Air Force
  - 355th Wing (host wing)
    - Headquarters 355th Wing
    - 563rd Rescue Group
      - 48th Rescue Squadron
      - 55th Rescue Squadron – HH-60W Jolly Green II
      - 68th Rescue Squadron – Guardian Angel Formal Training Unit
      - 79th Rescue Squadron – HC-130J Combat King II
      - 563rd Operations Support Squadron
    - 355th Maintenance Group
      - 55th Rescue Generation Squadron
      - 79th Rescue Generation Squadron
      - 355th Component Maintenance Squadron
      - 355th Equipment Maintenance Squadron
      - 355th Munitions Squadron
    - 355th Medical Group
      - 355th Aerospace Medicine Squadron
      - 355th Dental Squadron
      - 355th Medical Operations Squadron
      - 355th Medical Support Squadron
    - 355th Mission Support Group
      - 355th Civil Engineer Squadron
      - 355th Communications Squadron
      - 355th Contracting Squadron
      - 355th Force Support Squadron
      - 355th Logistics Readiness Squadron
      - 355th Security Forces Squadron
- Sixteenth Air Force
  - 55th Wing
    - 55th Electronic Combat Group (GSU)
      - 41st Electronic Combat Squadron – EA-37B Compass Call
      - 42nd Electronic Combat Squadron – EA-37B Compass Call
      - 43rd Electronic Combat Squadron – EA-37B Compass Call
      - 755th Aircraft Maintenance Squadron
      - 755th Operations Support Squadron
  - 557th Weather Wing
    - 1st Weather Group
      - 25th Operational Weather Squadron (GSU)
- US Air Force Warfare Center
  - 53rd Wing
    - 53rd Test and Evaluation Group
      - 418th Test and Evaluation Squadron (GSU) – EA-37B Compass Call and HC-130J Combat King II
      - 88th Test and Evaluation Squadron (GSU) – HH-60W Jolly Green II (Relocating from Nellis AFB by 2028)
  - 57th Wing
    - 57th Operations Group
      - 414th Combat Training Squadron
        - Red Flag Rescue Detachment (GSU)
    - USAF Weapons School
      - 34th Weapons Squadron (GSU) – HH-60W Jolly Green II and HC-130J Combat King II (Relocating from Nellis AFB by 2028)

Air Force Materiel Command (AFMC)

- Air Force Test Center
  - 96th Test Wing
    - 413th Flight Test Squadron
      - Detachment 1 (GSU) – HH-60W Jolly Green II (Relocating from Nellis AFB by 2028)
- Ogden Air Logistics Complex
  - 309th Aerospace Maintenance and Regeneration Group (GSU)

Air Force Reserve Command (AFRC)

- Tenth Air Force
  - 920th Rescue Wing
    - 943rd Rescue Group (GSU)
      - 305th Rescue Squadron – HH-60W Jolly Green II
      - 306th Rescue Squadron
      - 943rd Aerospace Medicine Squadron
      - 943rd Maintenance Squadron
      - 943rd Mission Support Flight
      - 943rd Operations Support Flight

Air National Guard (ANG)

- Arizona Air National Guard
  - 162nd Wing
    - 214th Attack Group (GSU)
      - 214th Attack Squadron – MQ-9A Reaper
    - Air Sovereignty Alert Detachment (GSU) – F-16 Fighting Falcon
    - Total Force Training Center (GSU)

=== United States Navy ===
United States Navy Reserve

- Navy Reserve Center – Tucson

=== United States Space Force ===
United States Space Forces – Southern

=== United States Custom and Border Protection ===
Air and Marine Operations

- Tucson Air Branch – various fixed and rotary wing aircraft

== Previous names ==
- Established as: Davis–Monthan Landing Field, 1 November 1925
- Tucson Municipal Airport, 6 October 1927
- Davis–Monthan Field, 3 December 1941
- Davis–Monthan AFB, 13 January 1948 – present

== Major commands to which assigned ==
- Fourth Air Force, 1 February 1942 – 8 February 1943
- Second Air Force, 8 February 1943 – 16 November 1945
- Air Technical Service Command, 16 November 1945 – 31 March 1946
- Strategic Air Command, 31 March 1946 – 1 October 1976
- Tactical Air Command, 1 October 1976 – 1 June 1992
- Air Combat Command, 1 June 1992 – present

== Major units assigned ==
- 41st Bombardment Group, 15 January – 14 May 1941
- 31st Air Base Group, 30 April 1941 – 30 April 1942

Redesignated: 31st Service Group, 30 April – 16 August 1942

- 1st Bombardment Wing, 28 May 1941 – 16 July 1942
- 4th (later IV) Bomber Command, 19 September – 15 December 1941
- 382d Bombardment Group, 23 January 1942 – 4 April 1943
- 39th Bombardment Group, 5 February – 1 April 1942
- 327th Air Base Group, 2 March – 1 May 1942
- 335th Air Base Group, 30 March 1942 – 2 February 1943
- 34th Bombardment Group, 13 May – 1 July 1942
- 32d Base HQ and Air Base Sq, 13 June 1942 – 25 March 1944
- 308th Bombardment Group, 20 June – 1 October 1942
- 302d Bombardment Group, 23 June – 30 July 1942; 2 December 1942 – 27 January 1943
- 381st Base HQ & Air Base Group, 27 June – 18 November 1942
- 380th Bombardment Group, 3 October – 1 December 1942
- 385th Bombardment Group, 1 December 1942 – 3 January 1943
- 389th Bombardment Group, 24 December 1942 – 1 February 1943
- 392d Bombardment Group, 26 January – 1 March 1943
- 399th Bombardment Group, 1 March – 10 April 1943
- 444th Bombardment Group, 1 March – 31 July 1943; 1 May – 1 October 1946
- 446th Bombardment Group, 1 April – 6 June 1943
- 5th Altitude Training Unit, 10 April 1943 – 1 April 1944
- 400th Bombardment Group, 11 April – 1 May 1943
- 447th Bombardment Group, 1 May – 4 July 1943
- 449th Bombardment Group, 1 May – 5 July 1943
- 451st Bombardment Group, 1 May – 3 June 1943
- 16th Bombardment Operational Training Wing, 1 June – 12 October 1943
- 459th Bombardment Group, 22 September – 25 October 1943
- 491st Bombardment Group,1 October – 11 November 1943
- 486th Bombardment Group, 9 November 1943 – 9 March 1944
- 499th Bombardment Group, 20 November – 1 December 1943
- 233d AAF Base Unit, 25 March 1944 – 16 November 1945
- 502d Bombardment Group, 1–5 June 1944
- 489th Bombardment Group, 3 April – 13 July 1945
- 466th Bombardment Group, 26 August – 17 October 1945
- 39th Bombardment Group, 1 September – 17 October 1945
- 4105th AAF Base Unit, 16 November 1945 – 31 March 1946
- 248th AAF Base Unit, 31 March 1946 – 19 November 1947
- 28th Services Group, 10 May 1946 – 19 November 1947
- 40th Bombardment Group, 13 May – 1 October 1946
- 43d Bombardment Group, 1 October 1946 – 17 November 1947
- 419th Army Air Force (later Air Force) Base Unit, 1 November 1946 – 27 June 1949
- 57th Fighter Squadron, 15 May 1947 – 27 June 1949
- 303d Air Services Group, 27 September – 7 November 1947
- 43d Bombardment Wing, 17 November 1947 – 15 March 1960
- 2nd Bombardment Wing, 31 December 1948 – 1 January 1949
- 459th Bombardment Group, 27 January 1949 – 16 June 1951
- 303d Bombardment Wing, 4 September 1951 – 8 June 1964
- 36th Air Division, 15 June 1952 – 15 March 1960
- 803d Air Base (later Combat Support) Group, 16 June 1952 – 30 April 1976
- 15th Fighter-Interceptor Squadron (ADC), 20 April 1953 – 24 December 1964
- 2704th AAF Aircraft Storage & Disposition Group, 1 August 1959 – 1 February 1965

Redesignated: Military Aircraft Storage and Redistribution Center, 1 February 1965 – 1 July 1984
Redesignated: Aerospace Maintenance and Regeneration Center, 1 July 1984
Redesignated: 309th Aerospace Maintenance and Regeneration Group, 1 May 2007 – present

- 390th Bombardment (later Strategic Missile) Wing, 1 January 1962 – 1984
- 12th Air Division, 16 January 1962 – 30 September 1976
- 4080th Strategic Wing, 1 July 1963 – 25 June 1966
- 4453d Combat Crew Training Wing, 1 July 1964 – 30 September 1971
- 100th Strategic Reconnaissance Wing, 25 June 1966 – 30 September 1976
- 355th Fighter Wing (various designations) 1 July 1971 – present
- 432d Tactical Drone Group, 1 July 1976 – 1 April 1979
- 836th Air Division, 1 January 1981 – 1 May 1992
- 55th Electronic Combat Group, 1 April 1992 – present
- Twelfth Air Force, 1 October 1992 – present
- 563d Rescue Group, 1 October 2003 – present
- 943d Rescue Group, 12 April 2005 – present

== See also ==
- Arizona World War II Army Airfields
- Bobrovka (air base) - one Soviet aircraft storage counterpart to Davis–Monthan Air Force Base
- List of United States Air Force installations
- Pima Air & Space Museum – located adjacent to the base
