= 214th Division (People's Republic of China) =

214th Division (1949–52)
- Active: 1949.11 - 1952.8
- Country: People's Republic of China
- Branch: People's Liberation Army
- Type: Division
- Role: Infantry
- Part of: 52nd Corps
- Engagements: Chinese Civil War

The 214th Division (Chinese: 第214师) was created in November 1949 under the Regulation of the Redesignations of All Organizations and Units of the Army, issued by the Central Military Commission on November 1, 1948, based on the 1st Division, 1st Corps, 1st Army Group of the People's Liberation Army of the Nationalist Party of China. Its history can be traced back to the 197th Division, 100th Corps, 1st Army Group of the Republic of China Army, which defected in August 1948.

The division was part of the 52nd Corps. Under the flag of the 214th division, it took part in the Chinese Civil War.

In September 1951, the division was transferred to Army Group's control following 52nd Corp's disbandment. In March 1952, the division became a flood diversion project unit working against the flood on Ching River. In August 1952, after completion of the project, the division was disbanded and absorbed by the People's Volunteer Army.
