= 214 (disambiguation) =

214 may refer to:

- 214 (number), the number
- 214, the year CE
- 214 BC, the year BCE
- Area codes 214, 469, and 972, one of the telephone area codes of Dallas, Texas
- Type 214 submarine, or 214-class South Korean submarine
- Asiana Airlines Flight 214, an aircraft accident at San Francisco International Airport

== Music ==
- 214 (song), a 1994 song by Filipino band Rivermaya.

== See also ==
- 214th (disambiguation)
