= 214th Attack Squadron =

Arizona Air National Guard unit

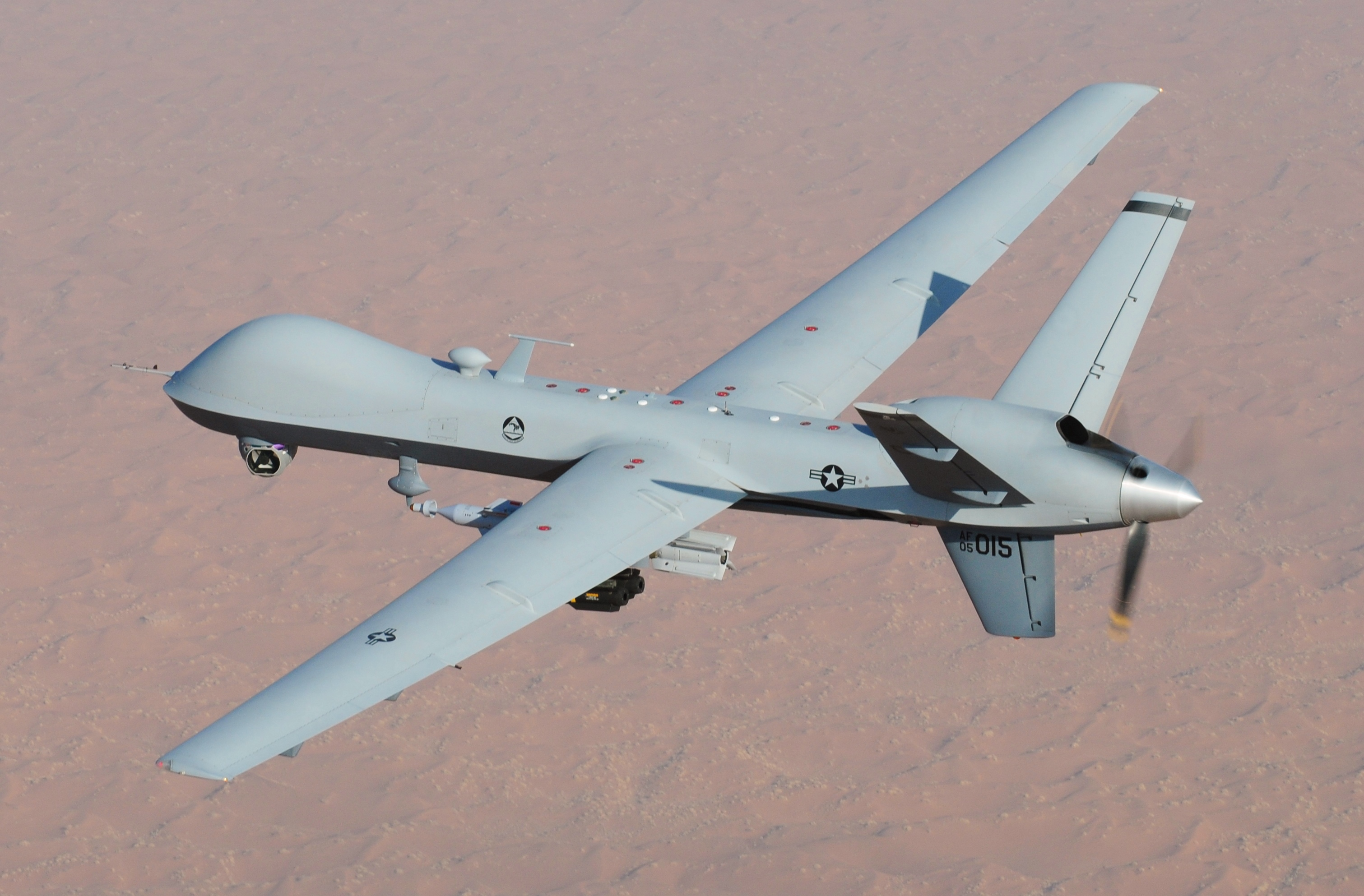
- A MQ-9 Reaper
- Active: 2007–present
- Country: United States
- Allegiance: Arizona
- Branch: Air National Guard
- Type: Squadron
- Role: UAV Attack
- Part of: Arizona Air National Guard
- Garrison/HQ: Davis-Monthan Air Force Base, Tucson, Arizona.

Insignia
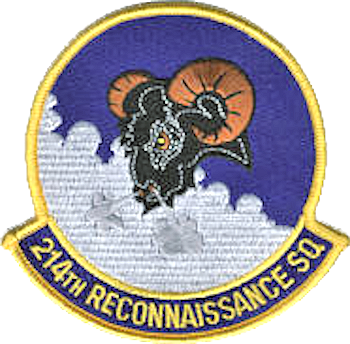
- 214th Attack Squadron emblem

Aircraft flown
- Reconnaissance: MQ-9 Reaper

The 214th Attack Squadron (214 ATKS) is a unit of the Arizona Air National Guard's 214th Attack Group located at Davis-Monthan Air Force Base, Tucson, Arizona and is operationally gained by the Air Combat Command (ACC). The 214th is equipped with the General Atomics MQ-9 Reaper.

== Operations ==
Arizona Air National Guard Predator operations will first fill worldwide theater requirements but will also likely evolve into providing direct defense for the homeland in conjunction with the Department of Homeland Security and U.S. Northern Command.

A permanent facility located at Davis-Monthan Air Force Base was completed 2009.

== Specifics ==
- Lineage: Designated 214th Reconnaissance Squadron, and allotted to Arizona ANG, 2007

Extended federal recognition and activated, 29 August 2007

- Assignment: 214th Attack Group,
- Station: Davis-Monthan Air Force Base, Arizona
