= 214th (Saskatchewan) Battalion, CEF =

The 214th (Saskatchewan) Battalion, CEF was a unit in the Canadian Expeditionary Force during the First World War. Based in Wadena, Saskatchewan, the unit began recruiting in early 1916 in the districts of Mackenzie and Humboldt. After sailing to England in April 1917, the battalion was absorbed into the 15th Reserve Battalion on April 29, 1917. The 214th (Saskatchewan) Battalion, CEF had one Officer Commanding: Lieut-Col. J. H. Hearn.
