= 214th Attack Group =

Arizona Air National Guard unit

214th Attack Group

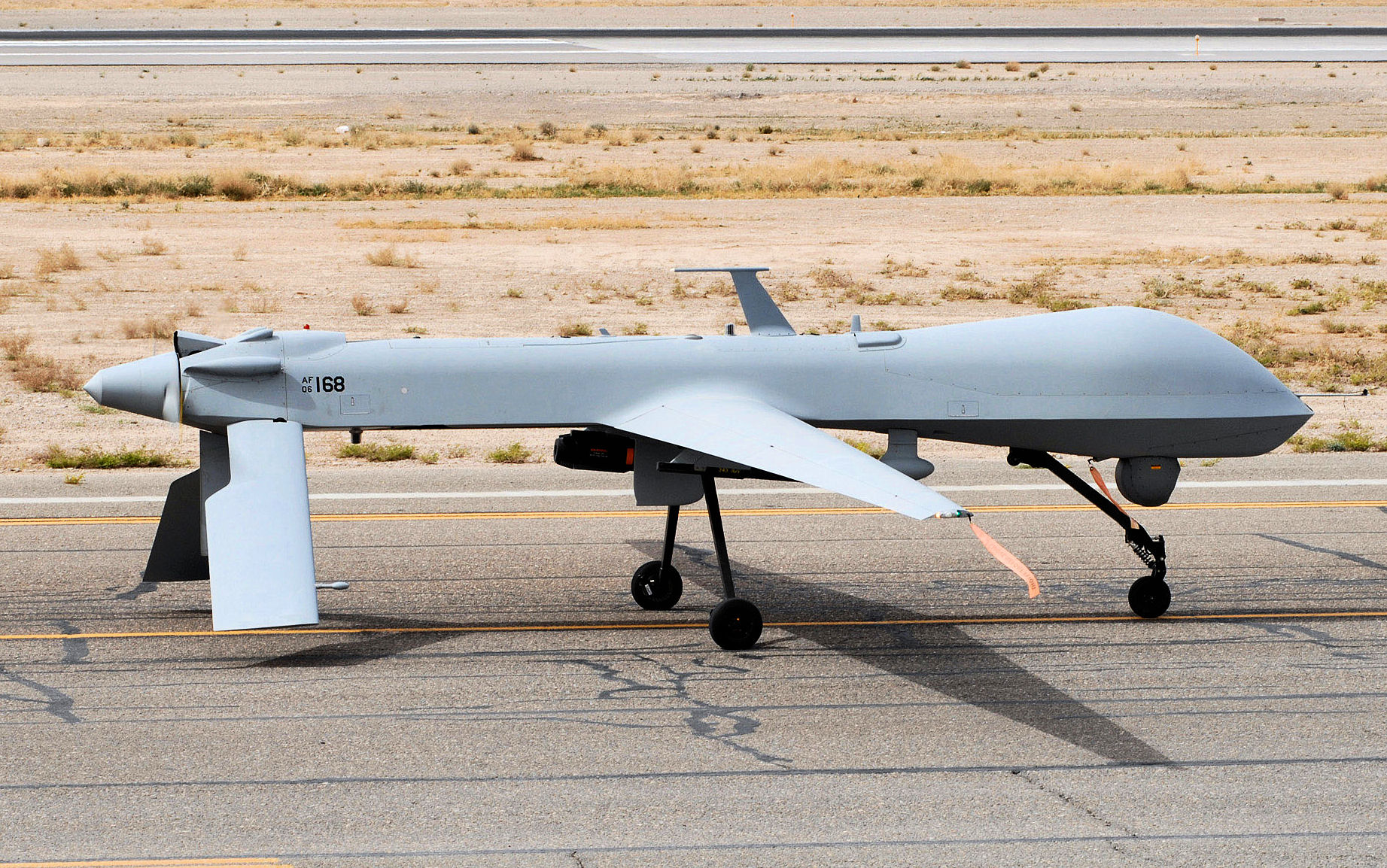
- 214th Attack Squadron - General Atomics MQ-1B Predator, AF Ser. No. 06-3168
- Active: 2007-present
- Country: United States
- Allegiance: Arizona
- Branch: Air National Guard
- Type: Group
- Role: UAV Attack
- Part of: Arizona Air National Guard
- Garrison/HQ: Davis-Monthan Air Force Base, Arizona.

Insignia
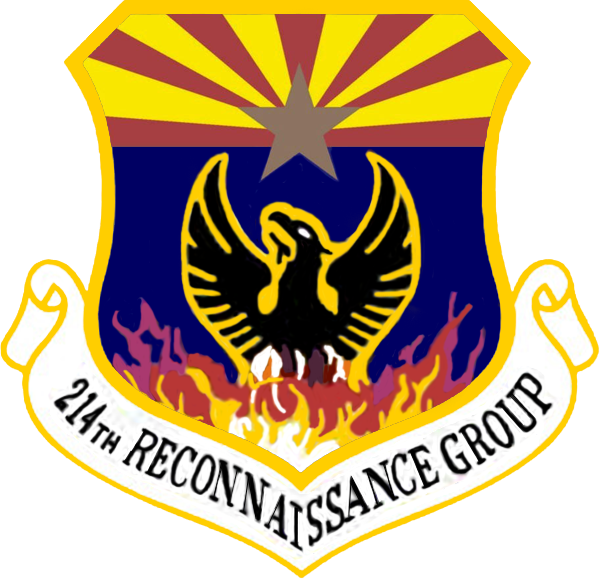
- 214th Attack Group emblem

Aircraft flown
- Reconnaissance: MQ-1 Predator

The 214th Attack Group is a unit of the Arizona Air National Guard's 162d Fighter Wing, stationed at Davis-Monthan Air Force Base, Arizona, with an additional operating location at Libby Army Airfield at Fort Huachuca, Arizona. If activated to federal service with the United States Air Force, the 214 RG is operationally gained by the Air Combat Command (ACC).

== Mission ==
The 214th Attack Group flies the MQ-1b Predator over Afghanistan via satellite from ground control stations in Tucson. Arizona Air Guardsmen fly 24/7 operations saving American lives through the vital information they provide to troops on the ground.

== Operations ==
Currently, the unit flies over Afghanistan on a continual basis flying 20 hours per day, seven days per week.

Predator operations provided U.S. troops on the ground with both daylight and infrared video of selected targets. In addition, the aircraft could carry two laser-guided AGM-114 Hellfire air to surface missiles.

Arizona Air National Guard Predator operations will first fill worldwide theater requirements, but will also likely evolve into providing direct defense for the homeland in conjunction with the Department of Homeland Security and U.S. Northern Command.

A permanent facility located at Davis-Monthan Air Force Base was completed in 2009.

== Fraud scandal ==
A 2009 investigation found that some members of the 214 RG may have fraudulently collected reimbursement for living expenses from the government over several years. In response, Colonel Gregg Davies was removed from command of the 214 RG on 23 November 2009 by Arizona Air National Guard commander, Brigadier General Michael Colangelo. A state inspector general investigation later concluded that Davies' relief constituted "retaliation," but declined to reinstate him into the Air National Guard. Brigadier General Michael Colangelo was subsequently relieved from his post in command of the Arizona ANG.

In late 2013, following his retirement from the Air Force and Air National Guard, Colonel Davies was indicted by the Arizona Attorney General, Tom Horne on fraud charges. Also indicted were seven other officers and thirteen enlisted airmen from the 12 RG. The indictment contends that all named defendants falsified their home addresses so they could collect temporary duty allowances (per diem, etc.) while performing Federalized service at their home station. The charges were subsequently dropped in 2014. Some cases were dropped via prosecution diversion agreements, some were dropped with prejudice and in at least one case the prosecution and Pima county judge ruled that an accused officer was wrongfully indicted.

== Lineage ==
- Designated 214th Reconnaissance Group and allotted to the Arizona ANG, 2007

Extended federal recognition and activated on 29 August 2007
Redesignated 214th Attack Group in 2017

=== Assignment ===
- 162d Fighter Wing, 2007 – present

=== Components ===
- 214th Reconnaissance Squadron: 2007 – present
- 214th Operations Support Squadron: 2007 – present

=== Station ===
- Davis-Monthan Air Force Base, Arizona, 2007 – present (Note: An additional operating location is at Libby Army Airfield on Fort Huachuca, Arizona.)

=== Aircraft ===
- General Atomics MQ-1 Predator, 2007 – present
- Fairchild RC-26 Condor, 2007 – present
