= Outline of the U.S. Air Force in Europe at the end of the Cold War =

The following is a hierarchical outline for the elements of the United States Air Force in Europe at the end of the Cold War. This list is intended to convey the connections and relationships between units and formations. In case of war with the Warsaw Pact, all would have been assigned to NATO.

Below, are listed all United States Air Force units based in Europe on 30 June 1989 and, where required, lists changes that occurred during 1989. The primary source for this listing of units is O.W. Dragoner's United States Air Force 1989, with additions and amendments from the official fact sheets of the Air Force Historical Research Agency. Where the two sources disagree, AFHRA data has been used.

The United States Air Forces in Europe (USAFE) was a major command of the U.S. Air Force based at Ramstein Air Base in West Germany. In 1989 the commanded had a strength of 60,471 men (6,876 officers and 53,595 enlisted), which were supported by 9,982 civilian contractors and employees. This does not include the personnel of other major commands (i.e. Strategic Air Command, Military Airlift Command, Electronic Security Command, etc.) that operated in Europe too.

The Commander in Chief of USAFE double-hatted as NATO's Commander Allied Air Forces Central Europe (COMAAFCE). The Vice Commander in Chief of USAFE was based along with the commander in Germany, while the Deputy Commander in Chief USAFE was based in Naples at NATO's Allied Forces Southern Europe Headquarters, where he double hatted as Commander Allied Air Forces, Southern Europe (COMAIRSOUTH).

== United States Air Forces in Europe ==
- United States Air Forces in Europe, at Ramstein Air Base, West Germany
  - European Air Combat Operations Staff (EACOS), at Ramstein Air Base
    - Detachment 1, EACOS, at RAF Greenham Common (UK)
  - 1141st USAF Special Activities Squadron, at Patch Barracks in Stuttgart (West Germany)
    - Detachment 1, 1141st USAFSAS, at Supreme Headquarters Allied Powers Europe in Mons (Belgium)
    - Detachment 2, 1141st USAFSAS, at AFCENT Headquarters in Brunssum (Netherlands),
    - Detachment 3, 1141st USAFSAS, at AFNORTH Headquarters in Kolsås (Norway),
    - Detachment 4, 1141st USAFSAS, at AFSOUTH Headquarters in Naples (Italy)
    - Detachment 5, 1141st USAFSAS, at Sixth Allied Tactical Air Force Headquarters at Izmir Air Station (Turkey)
    - Detachment 6, 1141st USAFSAS, at AAFCE Headquarters at Ramstein Air Base
    - Detachment 7, 1141st USAFSAS, at NATO Air Base Geilenkirchen (West Germany)
    - Detachment 9, 1141st USAFSAS, at Fifth Allied Tactical Air Force Headquarters in Vicenza Air Base (Italy)
  - 7000th Special Activities Squadron, at Ramstein Air Base
    - Detachment 3, 7000th SAS, at Bitburg Air Base (West Germany)
  - 7000th Contracting Squadron, at Ramstein Air Base
  - 7001st Special Security Squadron, at Ramstein Air Base
  - 7002nd Civil Engineering Squadron, at Ramstein Air Base
  - 7025th Air Postal Squadron, at Kapaun Air Station (West Germany)
  - 7027th School Squadron (Kisling NCO Academy), at Kapaun Air Station (West Germany)
  - 7028th School Squadron (Mathies NCO Academy), at RAF Upwood (UK)
  - 7055th Operations Squadron, at Kapaun Air Station (West Germany), training allied troops in the use of US nuclear weapons
  - 7102nd Computer Services Squadron, at Ramstein Air Base
  - 7103rd Field Printing Squadron, at Ramstein Air Base
  - 7200th Management Engineering Squadron, at Ramstein Air Base
  - 7300th Materiel Squadron, at Ramstein Air Base
  - 7350th Air Base Group, at Tempelhof Airport, West Berlin, West Germany
  - 7575th Operations Group, at Rhein-Main Air Base, West Germany (Operating reconnaissance and SIGINT flights over East Germany via the West Berlin air corridors)
  - USAFE Warrior Preparation Center (USAFE WPC), at Einsiedlerhof Storage Annex in Kaiserslautern (West Germany), a computer simulation centre to train US and allied staffs
  - USAFE Air Ground Operations School / USAFE AGOS, at Sembach Air Base (West Germany)

=== Third Air Force ===
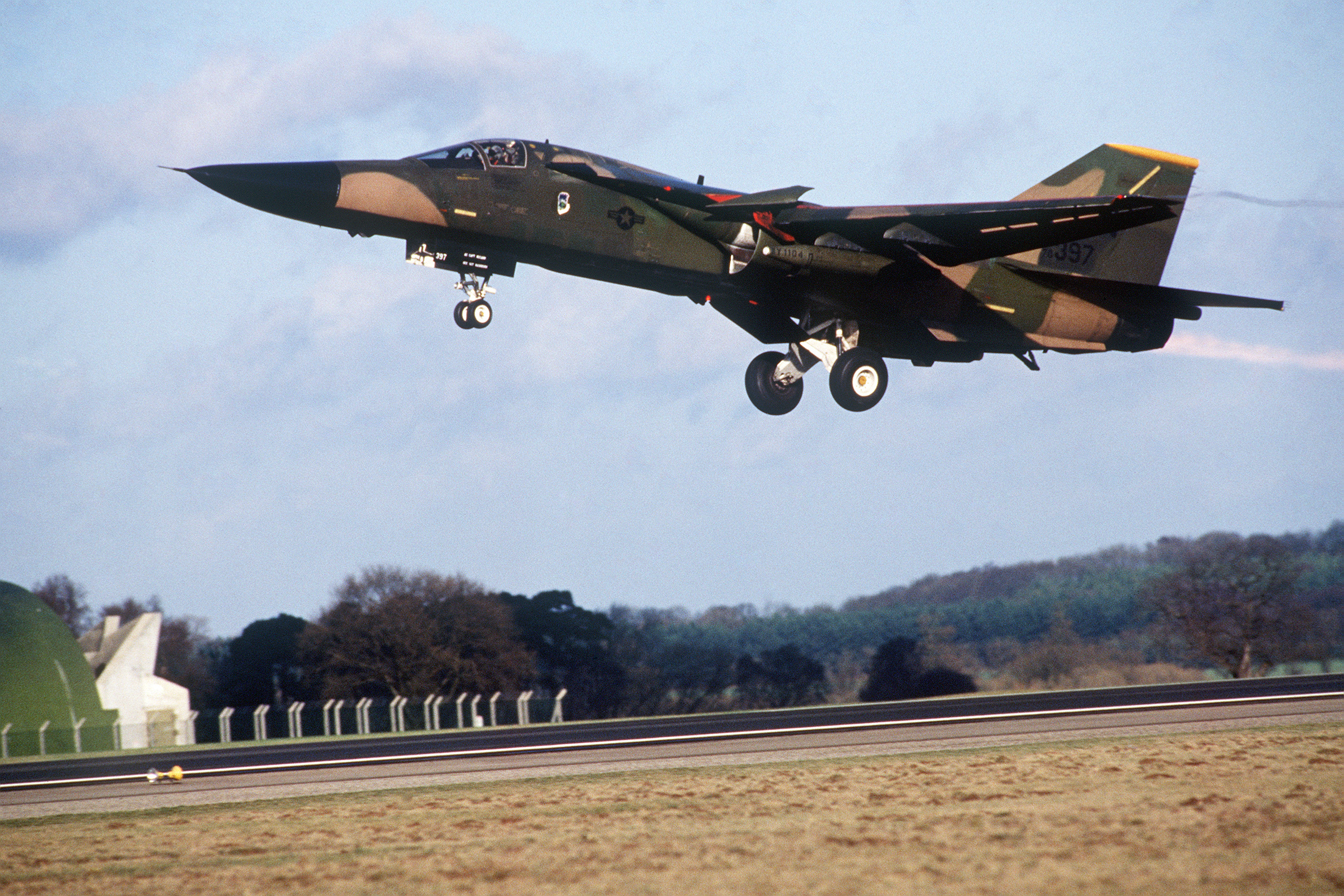
A F-111F aircraft from 493rd Tactical Fighter Squadron takes off from Hahn Air Base for a mission over West Germany during Exercise REFORGER '86.

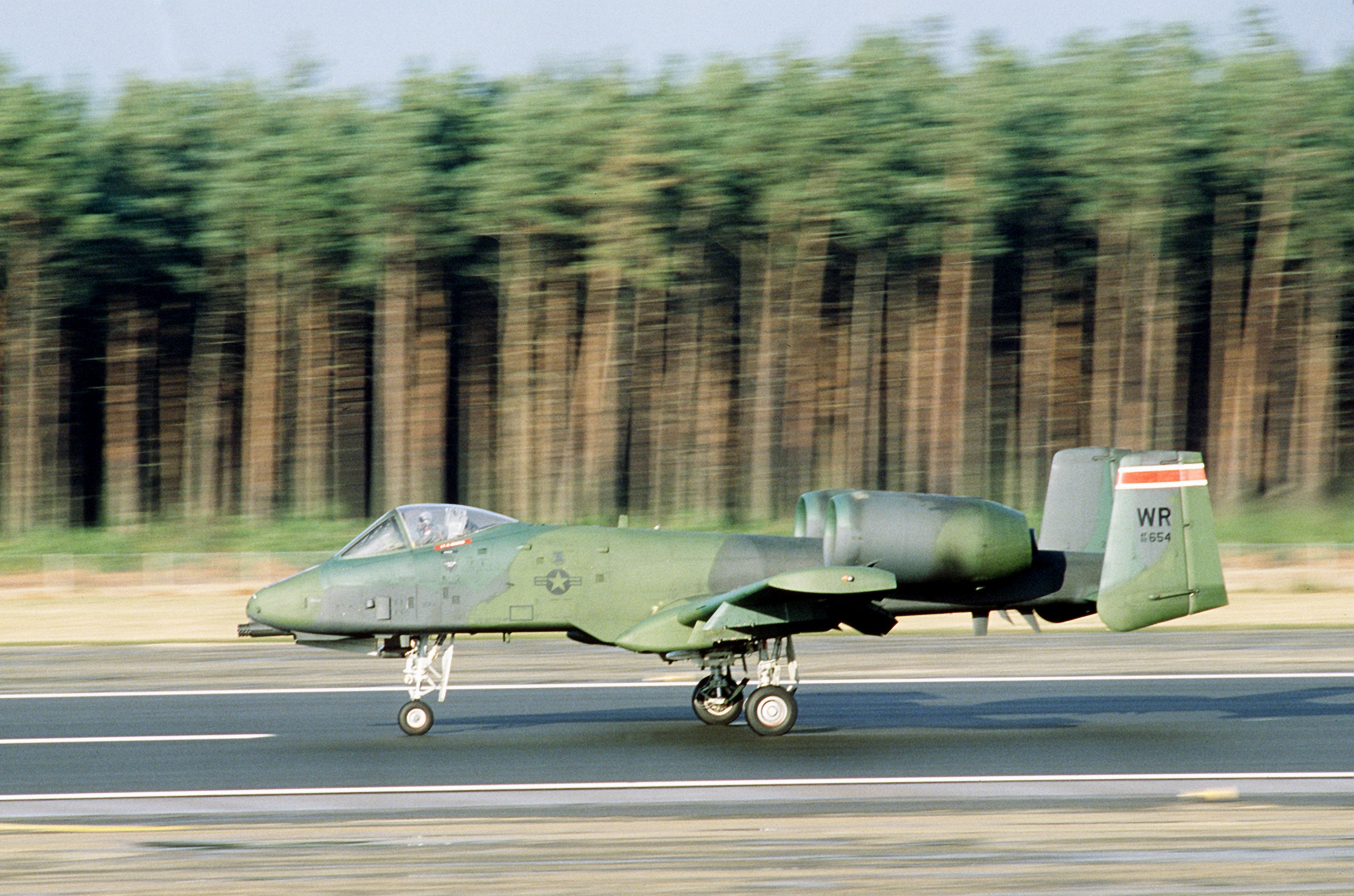
An A-10 Thunderbolt II aircraft from 78th Tactical Fighter Squadron takes off during Exercise REFORGER '86.

- Third Air Force, at RAF Mildenhall, United Kingdom
  - 10th Tactical Fighter Wing, at RAF Alconbury
    - 509th Tactical Fighter Squadron, with 24x A-10 Thunderbolt II
    - 511th Tactical Fighter Squadron, with 24x A-10 Thunderbolt II
  - 20th Tactical Fighter Wing, at RAF Upper Heyford
    - 55th Tactical Fighter Squadron, with 24x F-111E
    - 77th Tactical Fighter Squadron, with 24x F-111E
    - 79th Tactical Fighter Squadron, with 24x F-111E
    - 42d Electronic Combat Squadron, with 18x EF-111A Raven, detached from the 66th Electronic Combat Wing, at Sembach Air Base, West Germany
  - 48th Tactical Fighter Wing, at RAF Lakenheath
    - 492d Tactical Fighter Squadron, with 24x F-111F
    - 493d Tactical Fighter Squadron, with 24x F-111F
    - 494th Tactical Fighter Squadron, with 24x F-111F
    - 495th Tactical Fighter Squadron, with 24x F-111F (Training Squadron)
  - 81st Tactical Fighter Wing, at RAF Bentwaters
    - 78th Tactical Fighter Squadron, with 24x A-10 Thunderbolt II (based at RAF Woodbridge)
    - 91st Tactical Fighter Squadron, with 24x A-10 Thunderbolt II (based at RAF Woodbridge)
    - 92d Tactical Fighter Squadron, with 24x A-10 Thunderbolt II
    - 510th Tactical Fighter Squadron, with 24x A-10 Thunderbolt II
    - 527th Tactical Fighter Training Squadron, with 16x F-16C Falcon fighters for aggressor training
  - 513th Airborne Command and Control Wing, at RAF Mildenhall
    - 10th Airborne Command and Control Squadron, with Boeing EC-135
  - 303d Tactical Missile Wing, at RAF Molesworth
    - 87th Tactical Missile Squadron, with 64x BGM-109G Ground Launched Cruise Missiles
  - 501st Tactical Missile Wing, at RAF Greenham Common
    - 11th Tactical Missile Squadron, with 96x BGM-109G Ground Launched Cruise Missiles
  - 7020th Air Base Group, at RAF Fairford, USAFE's only B-52 Stratofortress heavy bomber base
  - 7274th Air Base Group, at RAF Chicksands
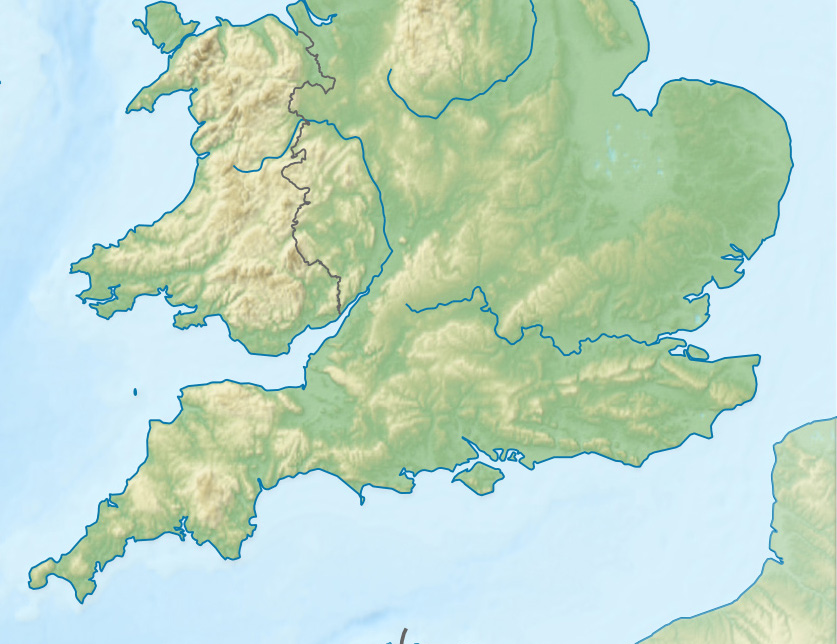
Third Air Force bases and stations in 1989

=== Sixteenth Air Force ===
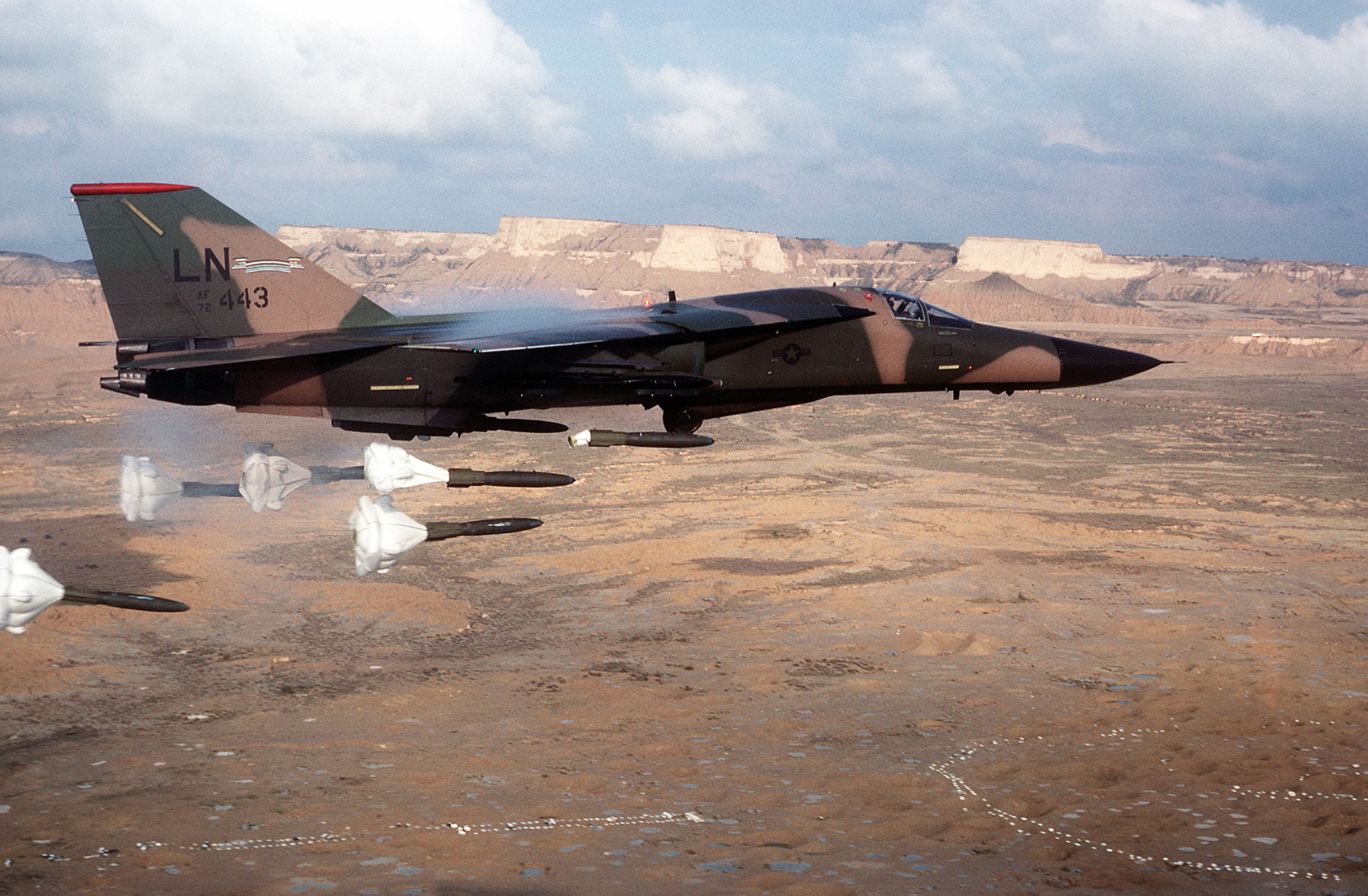
A F-111F aircraft from 494th Tactical Fighter Squadron releases its load of Mark 82 high-drag bombs over the Bardenas Reales Air-to-Ground Range.

- Sixteenth Air Force, at Torrejón Air Base, Spain
  - 401st Tactical Fighter Wing, at Torrejón Air Base
    - 612th Tactical Fighter Squadron, with 24x F-16C Block 30 Falcon
    - 613th Tactical Fighter Squadron, with 24x F-16C Block 30 Falcon
    - 614th Tactical Fighter Squadron, with 24x F-16C Block 30 Falcon
    - Detachment 2, at Morón Air Base, Spain
  - 406th Tactical Fighter Training Wing, at Zaragoza Air Base, Spain, supporting squadrons training at the Bardenas Reales Air-to-Ground Range
  - 487th Tactical Missile Wing, at Comiso Air Base, Italy
    - 302d Tactical Missile Squadron, with 112x BGM-109G Ground Launched Cruise Missiles
  - 40th Tactical Group, at Aviano Air Base, Italy, supporting squadrons training at the Maniago Air-to-Ground Range
    - 7401st Munitions Support Squadron, at Rimini Air Base, Italy
    - 7402d Munitions Support Squadron, at Ghedi Air Base, Italy
  - The United States Logistics Group (TUSLOG), at Ankara Air Station, Turkey
    - 39th Tactical Group, at Incirlik Air Base, Turkey
    - 7217th Air Base Group, at Ankara Air Station
    - 7241st Air Base Group, at Izmir Air Station
    - 7022d Air Base Squadron, at Pirinçlik Air Station, Turkey
    - 7391st Munitions Support Squadron, at Balıkesir Air Base
    - 7392d Munitions Support Squadron, at Eskisehir Air Base
    - 7393d Munitions Support Squadron, at Murted Air Base
    - 7394th Munitions Support Squadron, at Erhac Air Base
  - 7206th Air Base Group, at Hellenikon Air Base, Greece
    - Detachment 1, HQ, 7206th ABG – Iraklion AS (Kreta, GR)
    - 7206th Security Police Squadron
    - 7206th Supply Squadron
    - 7206th Air Base Group Hospital
    - 7061st Munitions Support Squadron, at Araxos Air Base, Greece
  - 7275th Air Base Group, at San Vito dei Normanni Air Station, Italy
  - 7276th Air Base Group, at Iraklion Air Station, Crete, Greece
  - 7555th Tactical Training Squadron, at Decimomannu Air Base, Italy, supporting squadrons training at the Air Combat Maneuvering and Instrumentation Range (ACMI) to the West of Sardinia
  - 7116th Tactical Control Flight, at Torrejón Air Base
  - 7120th Air Base Flight, at Morón Air Base
Sixteenth Air Force bases and stations in 1989

=== Seventeenth Air Force ===
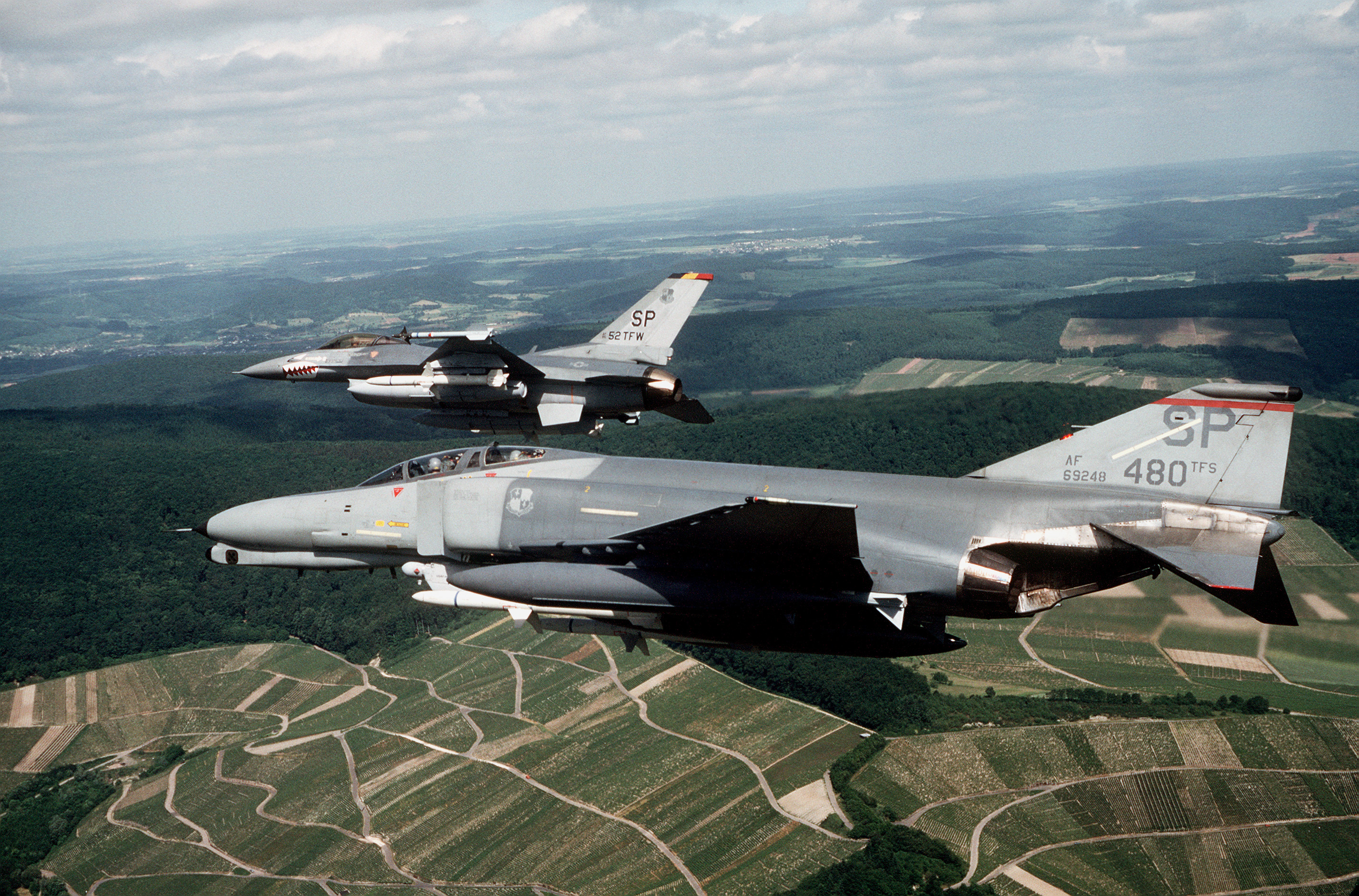
A F-4G Phantom II Wild Weasel from 480th Tactical Fighter Squadron and a F-16C Block 25 Falcon from 52nd Tactical Fighter Wing Commander fly over Germany in June 1989

- Seventeenth Air Force, at Sembach Air Base
  - 65th Air Division, at Lindsey Air Station
    - 52d Tactical Fighter Wing, at Spangdahlem Air Base
      - 23d Tactical Fighter Squadron, with 12x F-4G Phantom II Wild Weasel and 12x F-16C Block 25 Falcon
      - 81st Tactical Fighter Squadron, with 12x F-4G Phantom II Wild Weasel and 12x F-16C Block 25 Falcon
      - 480th Tactical Fighter Squadron, with 12x F-4G Phantom II Wild Weasel and 12x F-16C Block 25 Falcon
    - 66th Electronic Combat Wing, at Sembach Air Base
      - 42d Electronic Combat Squadron, detached to Third Air Force, at RAF Upper Heyford, UK
      - 43d Electronic Combat Squadron, with EC-130H Compass Call
  - 316th Air Division, at Ramstein Air Base
    - 86th Tactical Fighter Wing, at Ramstein Air Base
      - 512th Tactical Fighter Squadron, with 24x F-16C Block 30 Falcon
      - 526th Tactical Fighter Squadron, with 24x F-16C Block 30 Falcon
    - 377th Combat Support Wing, at Ramstein Air Base
  - 26th Tactical Reconnaissance Fighter Wing, at Zweibrücken Air Base
    - 38th Tactical Reconnaissance Squadron, with 22x RF-4C Phantom II
  - 36th Tactical Fighter Wing, at Bitburg Air Base
    - 22nd Tactical Fighter Squadron, with 24x F-15C Eagle
    - 53rd Tactical Fighter Squadron, with 24x F-15C Eagle
    - 525th Tactical Fighter Squadron, with 24x F-15C Eagle
  - 50th Tactical Fighter Wing, at Hahn Air Base
    - 10th Tactical Fighter Squadron, with 24 F-16C Block 25 Falcon
    - 313th Tactical Fighter Squadron, with 24 F-16C Block 25 Falcon
    - 496th Tactical Fighter Squadron, with 24 F-16C Block 25 Falcon
  - 38th Tactical Missile Wing, at Pydna Missile Base, Germany
    - 89th Tactical Missile Squadron, with 96x BGM-109G Ground Launched Cruise Missiles
  - 485th Tactical Missile Wing, at Florennes Air Base, Belgium
    - 71st Tactical Missile Squadron, with 48x BGM-109G Ground Launched Cruise Missiles
  - 601st Tactical Control Wing, at Sembach Air Base (operating AN/TPS-43 mobile radars)
  - 7100th Combat Support Wing, at Lindsey Air Station
    - 7100th Supply Squadron
    - 7100th Transportation Squadron
    - 7100th Comptroller Squadron
    - 7100th Combat Support Wing Medical Center, in Wiesbaden (GE), Medical Center Compound
      - 18th Aeromedical Staging Flight
    - 610th USAF Contingency Hospital, at Lindsey Air Station (GE)
    - 652d USAF Contingency Hospital, in Donaueschingen (GE), Donaueschingen Contingency Hospital Annex
    - 653d USAF Contingency Hospital, in Wiesbaden (GE)
    - 7261st Munitions Support Squadron, in Memmingerberg (GE), Fliegerhorst Memmingen (special weapons storage and maintenance)
    - 7361st Munitions Support Squadron, at Kleine Brogel Air Base, Belgium (special weapons storage and maintenance)
    - 7362d Munitions Support Squadron, at Volkel Air Base, Netherlands (special weapons storage and maintenance)
    - 7501st Munitions Support Squadron, in Alflen (GE), Büchel Air Base (special weapons storage and maintenance)
    - 7502d Munitions Support Squadron, in Nörvenich (GE), Nörvenich Air Base (special weapons storage and maintenance)
  - 4th Air Support Operations Group, in Frankfurt am Main (Liaison with V US Corps)
  - 8th Air Support Operations Group, in Stuttgart (Liaison with VII US Corps)
  - 32d Tactical Fighter Squadron, with 24x F-15C Eagle, at Soesterberg Air Base, Netherlands
  - 7104th Air Base Group, at Chièvres Air Base, Belgium
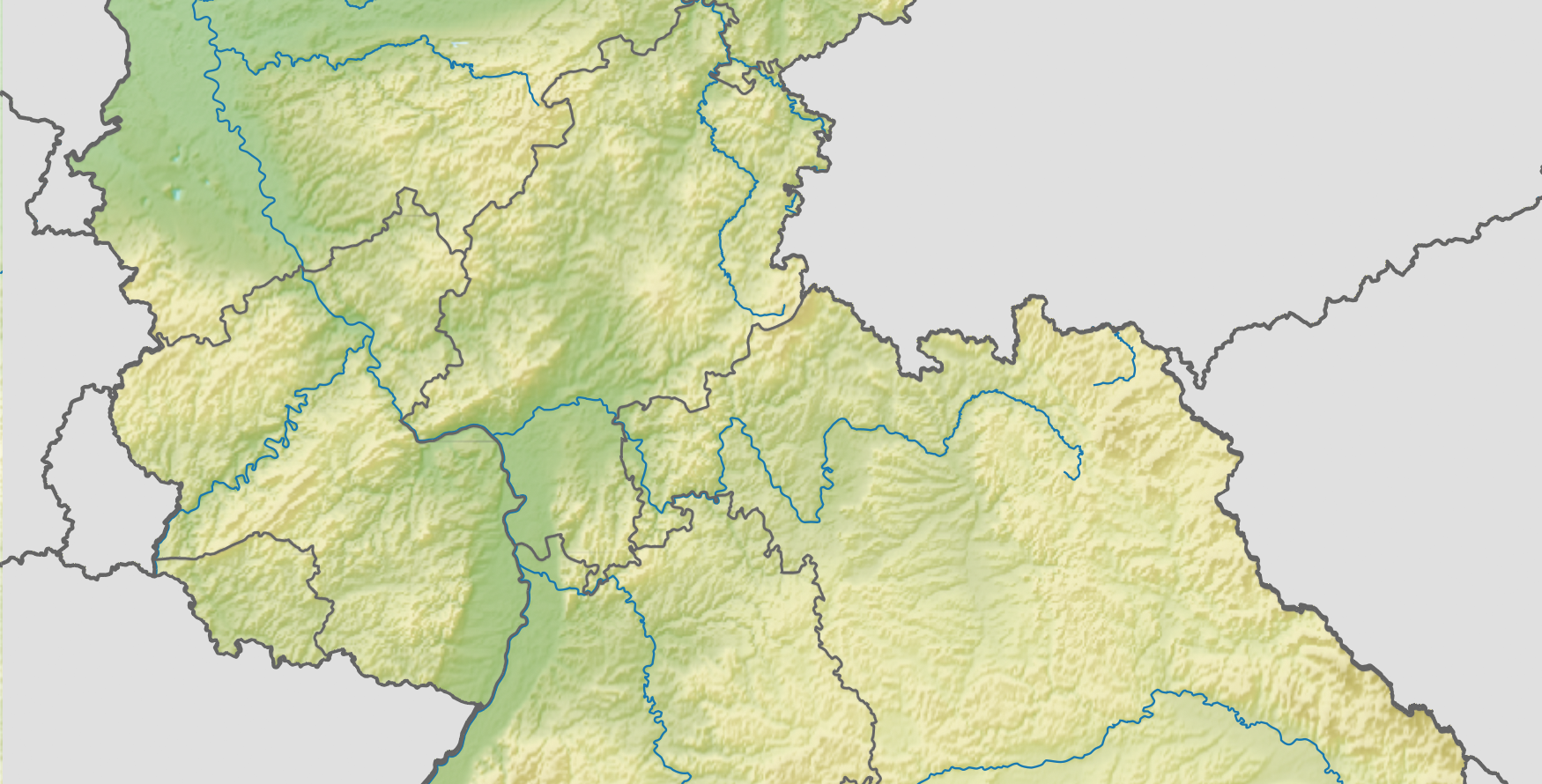
Seventeenth Air Force bases in Central West Germany 1989

=== 7455th Tactical Intelligence Wing ===
- 7455th Tactical Intelligence Wing, at Ramstein Air Base, West Germany
  - 497th Reconnaissance Technical Group, at Schierstein Kaserne in Wiesbaden, West Germany
    - Det. 1, HQ 497th RTG, at Ramstein Air Base, West Germany (disbanded September 1989)
    - 495th Reconnaissance Technical Squadron, at Ramstein Air Base (activated September 1989)
    - 496th Reconnaissance Technical Squadron, at RAF Alconbury, United Kingdom
  - 7450th Tactical Intelligence Squadron, at Ramstein Air Base
    - Det. 1, 7450th TIS, at Boerfink Mountain Kaserne in Börfink
  - 7451st Tactical Intelligence Squadron, in Wüschheim, operating Metro Tango Station
  - 7452d Special Activities Squadron, in West Berlin
  - 7453d Tactical Electronics Squadron, at Lindsey Air Station
  - 7454th Tactical Intelligence Squadron, in Börfink, operating the USAFE Tactical Fusion Center
  - 7456th Tactical Intelligence Squadron, at Ramstein Air Base, operating the USAFE Combat Operations Intelligence Center

== Strategic Air Command ==
- 7th Air Division, at Ramstein Air Base, West Germany, from the Strategic Air Command
  - 17th Reconnaissance Wing, at RAF Alconbury, (UK)
    - 95th Reconnaissance Squadron, with 14x TR-1
  - 306th Strategic Wing, at RAF Mildenhall, (UK)
    - Detachment 1, HQ, 306th SW, at Naval Air Station Keflavik (Iceland)
    - 2nd Strategic Squadron, supporting US based KC-135 Stratotanker and RC-135 deployed to RAF Mildenhall
    - 922d Strategic Squadron, at Hellenikon Air Base, Greece, supporting US based KC-135 Stratotanker and RC-135 deployed to Hellenikon Air Base
  - 11th Strategic Group, at RAF Fairford
    - 42d Strategic Squadron, at RAF Fairford, supporting US based KC-135 Stratotanker deployed to RAF Fairford
    - 34th Strategic Squadron, at Zaragoza Air Base, Spain, supporting US based KC-10 Extender deployed to Zaragoza Air Base
  - 9th Strategic Reconnaissance Wing, at Beale Air Force Base (California)
    - Detachment 3, HQ, 9th SRW, with 2x U-2R Dragon Lady, at RAF Akrotiri (Cyprus)
    - Detachment 4, HQ, 9th SRW, with 2x SR-71A Blackbird, at RAF Mildenhall (UK)

== Military Airlift Command ==
Military Airlift Command (MAC)

=== Twenty-First Air Force ===
- Twenty-First Air Force, at McGuire Air Force Base (New Jersey)
  - 322d Airlift Division, at Ramstein Air Base, West Germany, from the Military Airlift Command
    - Detachment 1, HQ, 322 ALD, at Campbell Barracks in Heidelberg (West Germany)
    - Detachment 2, HQ, 322 ALD, at Dhahran International Airport (Saudi Arabia)
    - Detachment 3, HQ, 322 ALD, at Rhein Main Air Base (West Germany)
    - 435th Tactical Airlift Wing, at Rhein-Main Air Base, West Germany
      - Detachment 1, HQ, 435th TAW, with VC-9A (based at Chievres Air Base (Belgium) as liaison aircraft for SACEUR)
      - 37th Tactical Airlift Squadron, with C-130E Hercules
      - 55th Aeromedical Airlift Squadron, with Douglas C-9A Nightingale
      - 435th Aerial Port Squadron
    - 313th Tactical Airlift Group, at RAF Mildenhall, supporting US based C-130 Hercules squadrons deployed to RAF Mildenhall
      - 313th Aerial Port Squadron
    - 608th Military Airlift Group, at Ramstein Air Base, West Germany
      - 10th Military Airlift Squadron, at Zweibrücken Air Base, with 20x C-23A Sherpa
      - 58th Military Airlift Squadron, at Ramstein Air Base, with C-12F Huron, C-20A, C-21A, T-43A and C-135B Stratolifter
      - 608th Aerial Port Squadron
    - 625th Military Airlift Support Group at Torrejon Air Base (Spain)
      - 625th Aerial Port Squadron
      - Detachment 1, HQ, 625th MASG, at Naval Station Rota (Spain)
      - Detachment 2, HQ, 625th MASG, at Naval Air Station Sigonella (Italy)
      - Detachment 3, HQ, 625th MASG, at Hellenikon Air Base (Greece)
      - Detachment 4, HQ, 625th MASG, at Naval Support Activity Naples (Italy)
      - Detachment 5, HQ, 625th MASG, at Aviano Air Base (Italy)
    - 628th Military Airlift Support Squadron, at Incirlik Air Base (Turkey)

=== Twenty-Third Air Force ===
At the beginning of 1989 the US Air Force's special forces and air rescue units were under command of Twenty-Third Air Force. As Twenty-Third Air Force's two types of units did not fit well together the Air Force decided to split it in two. In August 1989 Search and Rescue (SAR) units were moved to the newly established Air Rescue Service, which came under direct command of MAC, while special forces remained under Twenty-Third Air Force, which was redesignated Air Force Special Operations Command and elevated to major command on 22 May 1990. Here below only units of Twenty-Third Air Force are listed which were based in Europe.

- Twenty-Third Air Force (redesignated Air Force Special Operations Command 22 May 1990), at Hurlburt Field (Florida)
  - 39th Special Operations Wing, at Rhein Main Air Base (West Germany)
    - 7th Special Operations Squadron with 4x MC-130E Combat Talon I
    - 21st Special Operations Squadron with 6x MH-53J Pave Low III (based at RAF Woodbridge)
    - 67th Special Operations Squadron with 1x HC-130H, 4x HC-130N, 2x HC-130P (based at RAF Woodbridge)
    - 667th Consolidated Aircraft Maintenance Squadron, at RAF Woodbridge
  - 41st Rescue and Weather Reconnaissance Wing (redesignated Air Rescue Service in August 1989), at McClellan Air Force Base (California)
    - 56th Aerospace Rescue and Recovery Squadron, at Naval Air Station Keflavik (Iceland), with HH-3E Jolly Green Giant (renamed 56th Air Rescue Squadron in July 1989)
  - 375th Aeromedical Airlift Wing, at Scott Air Force Base (Illinois)
    - 2d Aeromedical Evacuation Squadron, at Rhein Main Air Base (West Germany)
    - 1467th Facility Checking Squadron, at Scott Air Force Base (Illinois)
      - Detachment 2, 1467th FCS, North American T-39A, at Rhein Main Air Base (West Germany)
  - 1720th Special Tactics Group, at Hurlburt Field (Florida)
    - 1723d Combat Control Squadron, at Hurlburt Field (Florida)
      - Detachment 1, 1723d CCS, at Rhein Main Air Base (West Germany)

=== Air Weather Service ===
The Air Weather Service provided weather and meteorological services to all branches of the US military.

- 2d Weather Wing (Air Weather Service), at Kapaun Air Station (West Germany)
  - Detachment 6, HQ, 2nd WW, at Patch Barracks in Stuttgart (GE),
  - Detachment 13, HQ, 2nd WW, at Hahn Air Base (GE)
  - Detachment 40, HQ, 2nd WW, at RAF Croughton (UK)
  - 7th Weather Squadron, at Campbell Barracks in Heidelberg, supporting US Army Europe units in West Germany
    - Detachment 1, 7th WS, at Feucht Army Airfield in Feucht
    - Detachment 2, 7th WS, at Fliegerhorst Kaserne in Erlensee
    - Detachment 3, 7th WS, at Königstuhl Radio Relay Station in Heidelberg
    - Detachment 4, 7th WS, at Dolan Barracks in Schwäbisch Hall
    - Detachment 5, 7th WS, at Katterbach Kaserne in Ansbach
    - Detachment 6, 7th WS, at Sickels Army Airfield in Fulda
    - Detachment 7, 7th WS, at East Camp Grafenwöhr in Grafenwöhr
    - Detachment 8, 7th WS, at Maurice Rose Army Airfield in Frankfurt am Main
    - Detachment 9, 7th WS, at Echterdingen Army Airfield in Filderstadt
    - Detachment 10, 7th WS, at Giebelstadt Army Airfield in Giebelstadt
    - Detachment 11, 7th WS, at Coleman Barracks in Mannheim
    - Detachment 12, 7th WS, at Finthen Army Airfield in Mainz
    - Detachment 13, 7th WS, at Storck Barracks in Illesheim
    - Detachment 26, 7th WS, at Wiesbaden Air Base (West Germany)
  - 28th Weather Squadron, at RAF Mildenhall, supporting Third Air Force
    - Detachment 3, 28th WS, at RAF Lakenheath
    - Detachment 4, 28th WS, at RAF Bentwaters
    - Detachment 15, 28th WS, at RAF Mildenhall
    - Detachment 17, 28th WS, at RAF Upper Heyford
    - Detachment 18, 28th WS, at RAF Fairford
    - Detachment 26, 28th WS, at RAF Greenham Common
    - Detachment 36, 28th WS, at RAF Alconbury
  - 31st Weather Squadron, at Sembach Air Base, supporting United States Air Forces in Europe with the exception of Third Air Force
    - Detachment 1, 31st WS, at Bitburg Air Base (West Germany)
    - Detachment 2, 31st WS, at Ramstein Air Base (West Germany)
    - Detachment 3, 31st WS, at Florennes Air Base (Belgium)
    - Detachment 7, 31st WS, at Aviano Air Base (Italy)
    - Detachment 8, 31st WS, at Zweibrücken Air Base (West Germany)
    - Detachment 9, 31st WS, at Comiso Air Base (Italy)
    - Detachment 11, 31st WS, at Spangdahlem Air Base (West Germany)
    - Detachment 12, 31st WS, at Torrejon Air Base (Spain)
    - Detachment 14, 31st WS, at Hahn Air Base (West Germany)
    - Detachment 16, 31st WS, at Zaragoza Air Base (Spain)
    - Detachment 19, 31st WS, at Incirlik Air Base (Turkey
    - Detachment 20, 31st WS, at Sembach Air Base (West Germany)
    - Detachment 25, 31st WS, at Rhein Main Air Base (West Germany)

=== Aerospace Audiovisual Service ===
The Aerospace Audiovisual Service was the Air Forces audiovisual production arm. It consisted of seven squadron, one of which was based in Europe.

- 1367th Audiovisual Squadron, at Ramstein Air Base (West Germany)
  - Detachment 1, 1367th AVS, at RAF Mildenhall (UK)
  - Detachment 2, 1367th AVS, at Sembach Air Base (West Germany)
  - Detachment 3, 1367th AVS, at Rhein Main Air Base (West Germany)
  - Detachment 4, 1367th AVS, at Torrejon Air Base (Spain)
  - Detachment 5, 1367th AVS, at Aviano Air Base (Italy)
  - Detachment 6, 1367th AVS, at Lajes Field (Azores islands, Portugal)

== European Communications Division, AFCC ==
The Deputy Chief of Staff, Communications of United States Air Forces in Europe (USAFE) double-hatted as Commander European Communications Division.

- European Communications Division (Air Force Communications Command), at Kapaun Air Station, West Germany
  - 1st Combat Communications Group, at Schierstein Compound in Wiesbaden
  - 1856th Communications Group, at Ramstein Air Base
    - Detachment 1, HQ, 1856th CG, at Lindsey Air Station
    - Detachment 2, HQ, 1856th CG, at Metro Tango Station in Wüschheim
    - 2062nd Communications Squadron, at Boerfink Mountain Kaserne in Börfink
  - 1946th Communications Squadron, at Tempelhof Central Airport in West Berlin
  - 1989th Communications Wing, at Torrejon Air Base (Spain), supporting Sixteenth Air Force
    - 2003rd Communications Group, at Ankara Air Station (Turkey)
      - Detachment 1, HQ, 2003rd CG, at Murted Air Base
      - Detachment 2, HQ, 2003rd CG, at Pirinçlik Air Station
      - Detachment 5, HQ, 2003rd CG, at Eskisehir Air Base
      - Detachment 6, HQ, 2003rd CG, at Balıkesir Air Base
      - Detachment 7, HQ, 2003rd CG, at Izmir Air Station
      - Detachment 12, HQ, 2003rd CG, at Sahintepe Radio Relay Site in Şahinyurdu
      - Detachment 14, HQ, 2003rd CG, at Yamanlar Radio Relay Site in Yamanlar
      - Detachment 16, HQ, 2003rd CG, at Elmadag Radio Relay Site in Elmadağ
      - 2006th Communications Squadron, at Incirlik Air Base
        - Detachment 11, 2006th CS, at Karatas Radio Relay Site in Yemişli
    - 2140th Communications Group, at Hellenikon Air Base (Greece)
      - Detachment 11, HQ, 2140th CG, at Mount Parnis Radio Relay Site in Parnis
      - Detachment 20, HQ, 2140th CG, at Mount Pateras Radio Relay Site in Pateras
      - 2115th Communications Squadron, at Iraklion Air Station
    - 2187th Communications Group, at Aviano Air Base (Italy)
      - Detachment 1, HQ, 2187th CG, at Monte Corna Radio Relay Site in Castiglione delle Stiviere (Italy)
      - Detachment 2, HQ, 2187th CG, at Decimomannu Air Base in Decimomannu (Italy)
      - 2113th Communications Squadron, at San Vito dei Normanni Air Station (Italy)
        - Detachment 26, 2113th CS, at Monte Nardello Radio Relay Site in Gambarie (Italy)
      - 2181st Communications Squadron, at Monte Vergine Radio Relay Site in Mercogliano (Italy)
      - 2189th Communications Squadron, at Comiso Air Base (Italy)
      - 1986th Communications Squadron, at Zaragoza Air Base (Spain)
      - 2186th Communications Squadron, at Torrejon Air Base (Spain)
        - Detachment 1, 2186th CS, at Humosa Radio Relay Site in Los Santos de la Humosa (Spain)
        - Detachment 4, 2186th CS, at Moron Air Base (Spain)
  - 2005th Communications Wing, at Sembach Air Base (West Germany), supporting Seventeenth Air Force
      - Detachment 3, HQ, 2005th CW, at Soesterberg Air Base (Netherlands)
    - 1945th Communications Group, at Rhein Main Air Base
      - Detachment 12, HQ, 1945th CG, at Camp King in Oberursel
      - Detachment 23, HQ, 1945th CG, at Prüm Air Station
      - Detachment 25, HQ, 1945th CG, at Langerkopf Communications Station in Wilgartswiesen
    - 1964th Communications Group, at Ramstein Air Base
    - 2063rd Communications Squadron, at Lindsey Air Station
    - 2134th Communications Squadron, at Sembach Air Base
      - Detachment 1, 2134th CS, at Hessisch Oldendorf Air Station
    - 2135th Communications Squadron, at Florennes Air Base (Belgium)
    - 2137th Communications Squadron, at Spangdahlem Air Base
      - Operating Location Chievres Air Base (Belgium)
    - 2139th Communications Squadron, at Bitburg Air Base
    - 2141st Communications Squadron, at Wüschheim Air Station
    - 2143rd Communications Squadron, at Zweibrücken Air Base
    - 2167th Communications Squadron, at Kalkar Communications Site in Kalkar
    - 2184th Communications Squadron, at Hahn Air Base
  - 2147th Communications Wing, at RAF Mildenhall (UK), supporting Third Air Force
    - 2130th Communications Group, at RAF Croughton
    - 1979th Communications Squadron, at RAF Lakenheath
    - 2112th Communications Squadron, at RAF Chicksands
    - 2119th Communications Squadron, at RAF Uxbridge
    - 2142nd Communications Squadron, at RAF Molesworth
    - 2160th Communications Squadron, at RAF Fairford
    - 2161st Communications Squadron, at RAF Greenham Common
    - 2164th Communications Squadron, at RAF Bentwaters
      - Detachment 1, 2164th CS, at RAF Martlesham Heath
    - 2166th Communications Squadron, at RAF Alconbury
      - Detachment 1, 2166th CS, at RAF Wethersfield
    - 2168th Communications Squadron, at RAF Upper Heyford
    - 2176th Communications Squadron, at RAF Mildenhall
      - Detachment 1, 2176th CS, at Allied Forces Northern Europe (AFNORTH) Headquarters in Kolsås (Norway)

== Electronic Security Command ==
- European Electronic Security Division (Electronic Security Command), at Ramstein Air Base, West Germany
  - Detachment 1, HQ, EESD, at Boerfink Mountain Kaserne in Börfink
  - Detachment 3, HQ, EESD, at McGraw Kaserne in Munich
  - 690th Electronic Security Wing, at Tempelhof Central Airport in West Berlin
    - Detachment 1, HQ, 690th ESW
  - 691st Electronic Security Wing, at Lindsey Air Station, West Germany
    - Detachment 1, HQ, 691st ESW
    - Detachment 2, HQ, 691st ESW, at Patch Barracks in Stuttgart
    - Detachment 3, HQ, 691st ESW, at McGraw Kaserne in Munich
    - Detachment 4, HQ, 691st ESW, at Echterdingen Army Airfield in Filderstadt
    - 6911th Electronic Security Squadron, at Metro Tango Station in Wüschheim
    - 6913th Electronic Security Squadron, at Flak Kaserne in Augsburg, operating the USASA Field Station Augsburg AN/FLR-9 Wullenweber radio direction finding antenna array
    - 6914th Electronic Security Squadron, at Mehlingen Communications Annex at Sembach Air Base
    - 6915th Electronic Security Squadron, at Bad Aibling Kaserne in Bad Aibling
    - 6919th Electronic Security Squadron, at Sembach Air Base
  - 693rd Electronic Security Wing, at RAF Chicksands (United Kingdom)
    - Detachment 1, HQ, 693rd ESW
    - Detachment 2, HQ, 693rd ESW, at RAF Edzell
    - Detachment 3, HQ, 693rd ESW, at RAF Menwith Hill
    - Detachment 4, HQ, 693rd ESW, at RAF Lakenheath
    - 6950th Electronic Security Group, at RAF Chicksands operating an AN/FLR-9 Wullenweber radio direction finding antenna array
    - 6952nd Electronic Security Squadron, at RAF Alconbury
    - 6988th Electronic Security Squadron, at RAF Mildenhall
  - 6917th Electronic Security Group, at San Vito dei Normanni Air Station
    - Detachment 1, HQ, 6917th ESG operating an AN/FLR-9 Wullenweber radio direction finding antenna array
  - 6916th Electronic Security Squadron, at Hellenikon Air Base (Greece)
  - 6931st Electronic Security Squadron, at Iraklion Air Station (Crete, Greece)

== See also ==
- Allied Air Forces Central Europe
  - Second Allied Tactical Air Force
  - Fourth Allied Tactical Air Force
