= HCMR =

HCMR may refer to:

- Hellenic Centre for Marine Research, a Greek research organization.
- Abdullahi Yusuf Airport, an airport in Somalia. (ICAO code)
- Household Cavalry Mounted Regiment, a cavalry regiment of the British Army
