= 22d Air Transport Squadron (disambiguation) =

The 22d Air Transport Squadron may refer to:

- The 922d Expeditionary Reconnaissance Squadron, which was active as the 22d Air Transport Squadron, Medium at Charleston Air Force Base, South Carolina from 8 March 1954 to 18 March 1958.
- The 22d Air Transport Squadron, which was active from 1 June 1948 at Fairfield-Suisun Air Force Base. This squadron replaced the second listed 22d Air Transport Squadron (Provisional). On 1 October 1948 it was redesignated the 1267th Air Transport Squadron. It was discontinued on 23 April 1949.
- The 22d Air Transport Squadron (Provisional), which was active from c. 14 March 1947 to 7 May 1947 at Morrison Field, Florida.
- The 22d Air Transport Squadron (Provisional), which was active from c. 23 April 1947 to 2 June 1948 at Fairfield-Suisun Army Air Field (later Fairfield-Suisun Air Force Base), California. This unit was replaced by the 22d Air Transport Squadron.
