= 1976 Tehran UFO incident =

Sighting of a UFO over Tehran, Iran

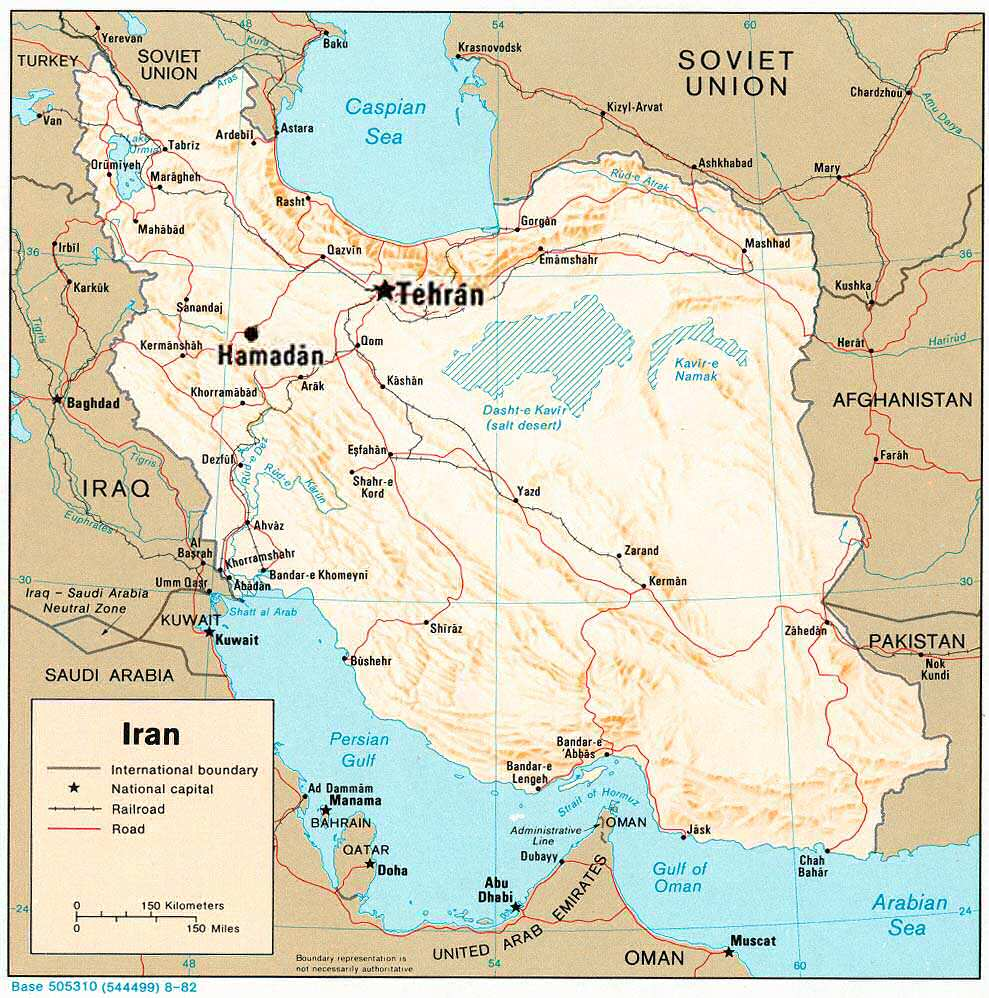
Map of Iran and surrounding countries, showing Tehran and Hamadan, where two F-4 jet interceptors were launched

On 19 September 1976, a radar and visual sighting of an unidentified flying object (UFO) occurred over Tehran, the capital of Iran, by civilians and military personnel. In separate incidents, two Imperial Iranian Air Force F-4 Phantom II jet interceptors reported losing instrumentation and communications as they approached the object. These were restored upon withdrawal. One of the aircraft also reported a temporary weapons systems failure while the crew was preparing to open fire. An airliner also reported radio failure.

== Background ==
Tehran is the capital of Iran, which was under the rule of the Pahlavi dynasty.

The incident occurred during the Cold War, when Unidentified Anomalous Phenomena were a serious concern.

== Incident ==
In the early hours of 19 September 1976, Hossein Pirouzi, an air traffic controller at the Mehrabad Airport Control Tower, received reports of a shining object in the sky above the Shemirān neighbourhood of Tehran by at least four civilians. Pirouzi himself saw the object, which he described as rectangular in shape with two large lights, one at either end, and a small red light circling its midsection. He reported this to General Youssefi of the Imperial Iranian Air Force (IIAF), who also observed the object from his balcony and subsequently authorized an interception with directions provided by Pirouzi.

An Iranian F-4 Phantom II in the 1970s, similar to the involved interceptors

At 1:30 a.m., Lieutenant Yaddi Nazeri (Yadollah Nazeri), plus a backseat weapons officer, were dispatched in an F-4 Phantom II jet interceptor to investigate. They could see the object from 70 miles (110 km) away. When 25 nautical miles (29 mi; 46 km) distant, he lost all instrumentation and UHF/Intercom communications, so they returned to base, reporting that the instruments came back online upon doing so. Nazeri later said in an interview in 1994 that the object outpaced him even at Mach 2, which was the time that he started to believe he was dealing with an extraterrestrial UFO.

Ten minutes later, Major Parviz Jafari, an IIAF squadron commander, along with First Lieutenant Jalal Damirian as weapons officer, were dispatched in a second F-4 Phantom II to intercept the object. This was ordered by General Youssefi, who advised the pilot that the object was comparable in size to a Boeing 707. Jafari reported acquiring a radar lock on the object at a range of 27 nautical miles (50 km; 31 mi) at 12 o'clock high position, and a rate of closure of 150 knots (280 km/h; 170 mph). Its size of radar return was similar to a Boeing KC-135 Stratotanker. At 25 nautical miles (46 km; 29 mi) distant, the object appeared to move away, as if to keep a distance.

As he approached the object, which Jafari described as "flashing with intense red, green, orange and blue lights so bright that I was not able to see its body", his plane's communications system shut off. Jafari later said he was "startled by a round object which came out of the primary object and started coming straight toward me at a high rate of speed, almost as if it were a missile", but as he attempted to fire an AIM-9 Sidewinder infrared guided missile, the pilot experienced a sudden power loss in the weapons control panel, as well as UHF and internal communications. The pilot promptly performed a turn and negative-G dive in an evasive manoeuvre, but the object took a position behind the F-4 at a distance of 3–4 nautical miles (3.5–4.6 mi; 5.6–7.4 km). The pilot then observed the second object "turn inside of him and then away", (Note: An object "turning inside" of an aircraft means it was capable of making a sharper turn, allowing it to approach a potentially more advantageous position within the fighter's turn circle.) subsequently returning and reuniting with the primary object. In addition to the powered equipment and communication shut down, the ejection seat, which was a mechanical mechanism, had also failed. According to General Youssefi, the second F-4 made another attempt at Mach 2 speed to intercept the object but failed to catch up with it.

When he was able to report to air traffic control, Jafari was instructed to return. As he did so, Jafari looked to his left and saw "the primary, diamond-shaped thing up there, and another bright object came out of it and headed directly toward the ground". Expecting an explosion that did not happen, he claimed that it "seemed to slow down and land gently on the ground, radiating a high bright light". The pilot then descended from an altitude of 25,000 feet (7,600 m) to 15,000 feet (4,600 m), marking the object's location.

Upon returning to the base and landing, further technical issues were reported by the jet. A nearby airliner also reported radio failure.

The next day, Jafari and Damirian flew by helicopter to the location of the object's "landing", finding nothing. As the helicopter circled to the west, a beeping transponder that appeared to have come from a military transport aircraft was detected in the area. Occupants of the nearby house reported hearing a loud noise and a bright flash of light during the previous night. Arrangements were made to do various tests, including radiation checks, on that area; the results were not reported.

== Aftermath ==
The crew were interviewed by the former Iranian Air Force commander Lt. Gen. Shapour Azarbarzin. A report of the incident was passed on to the US Air Force which, according to the Iranian general, was the procedure in case of a UFO sighting. Azarbarzin revealed further details in an interview on 4 January 1977. He said the speed of the object was estimated to be Mach 3. Other involved people were interviewed in 1994.

An initial report of the incident was relayed to the U.S. Joint Chiefs of Staff on the day of the incident. Other offices and agencies in the United States that received the report included the Secretary of State, the Central Intelligence Agency (CIA), the White House, the Air Force (CSAF), the Army Chiefs of Staff (CSA), the Chief of Naval Operations (CNO), the Defense Intelligence Agency (DIA), the Commander in Chief of U.S. Naval Forces in the Middle East, the Commander in Chief of the U.S. Air Force in Europe, the European Defense Air Command, and the Commander in Chief of Forces in Europe. However, it was reportedly a routine procedure to relay such incidents in "the sensitive Middle East area" to these offices.

== Analysis ==
According to Martin Bridgstock of Griffith University:

Stripped of details, a couple of F4 jets from the Iranian airforce were scrambled to investigate some sightings of lights in the sky. Reports vary, but at least one jet suffered grave electrical failures, tried to fire a missile at something and had something fired at it. A nearby jet airliner also suffered radio failure.

According to U.S. journalist Philip J. Klass, it was likely the pilots initially saw an astronomical body, probably Jupiter, an explanation also cited by aerospace researcher James Oberg. Klass wrote that pilot incompetence and equipment malfunction likely accounted for the reported equipment failures.

According to Klass, the Westinghouse technician at Shahrokhi Airbase stated that only the first F-4 reported failing equipment, and that this F-4 was known for equipment failures with a long history of electrical outages, having been repaired only a month before the incident. Klass cites a McDonnell Douglas repair supervisor's opinion that the F-4's radar could have been in "manual track" mode, causing a wrong interpretation of the radar lock.

Bridgstock criticized ufologists' reports as "not a reliable account of the Iran UFO incident" and summed up Klass' conclusions:

Klass found that only one aircraft had suffered electrical malfunctions, not two. What is more, that plane had had a history of unexplained electrical faults, and the electrical workshop responsible for it was notorious for poor performance. In this context, a temporary electrical malfunction can hardly be characterised as mysterious. He also points out that the aircrews at the time were tired and rattled, and could have mistaken stars or meteors for UFOs and "missiles". In addition, Klass points out that radio faults on airliners are not unknown, and that is why they carry backup radio sets.

Regarding one pilot's report of "bright objects" that "came at him, and that shot straight down into the ground", American sceptic author Brian Dunning observes that 19 September, the day of the incident, was the height of two annual meteorite showers, the Gamma Piscids and the Southern Piscids and the tail of the Eta Draconids shower, so observation of falling objects or odd lights would not have been unusual. The beeping transponder found at the supposed touchdown site was from a C-141 aircraft, according to investigating Col. Mooy, but "they'd been having problems with the beepers being ejected simply by turbulence over the mountains just north of Tehran".

According to Dunning:

Once we look at all the story's elements without the presumption of an alien spaceship, the only thing unusual about the Tehran 1976 UFO case is that planes were chasing celestial objects and had equipment failures. There have been many cases where planes had equipment failures, and there have been many cases where planes misidentified celestial objects. Once in a while, both will happen on the same flight.

Dunning criticized ufologists and UFO-themed television programs such as Sightings for describing all the events related to the incident "from the context of a presumption that the light was a hostile and intelligently guided alien spacecraft".

== UFOlogy ==
UFOlogists regard the incident as one of the most "credible" in ufology due to the level of documentation and the professional status of people involved.

A report by the National Aviation Reporting Center on Anomalous Phenomena headed by retired NASA scientist and ufologist Richard Haines noted a section of a document by the Defense Intelligence Agency (DIA), which described the reported incident as "outstanding", and a classic that meets all the criteria for a ufological study.

== In popular culture ==
Retired General Parviz Jafari later testified about the incident publicly at the 2007 National Press Club conference in Washington, D.C.

The event was also the subject of an Iranian movie, and it has been cited in the following media:

- The Sightings television program covered the incident in 1994, interviewing many of the participants.
- The Daily Telegraph's top 10 UFO sightings (#7).
- The Guardian's top 10 UFO sightings (#10).

An editorial (see below) was published in the United States Air Force Security Services quarterly MIJI (Meaconing, Intrusion, Jamming, and Interference) newsletter that is "often waved by the UFOlogists as compelling evidence". According to Dunning, "because this service requires a security clearance, their newsletter is protected as well. There is nothing especially interesting about the actual article; it's just a dramatized retelling of the same information in Col. Mooy's memo, offered in the newsletter as a curious editorial on the subject of jamming and interference."

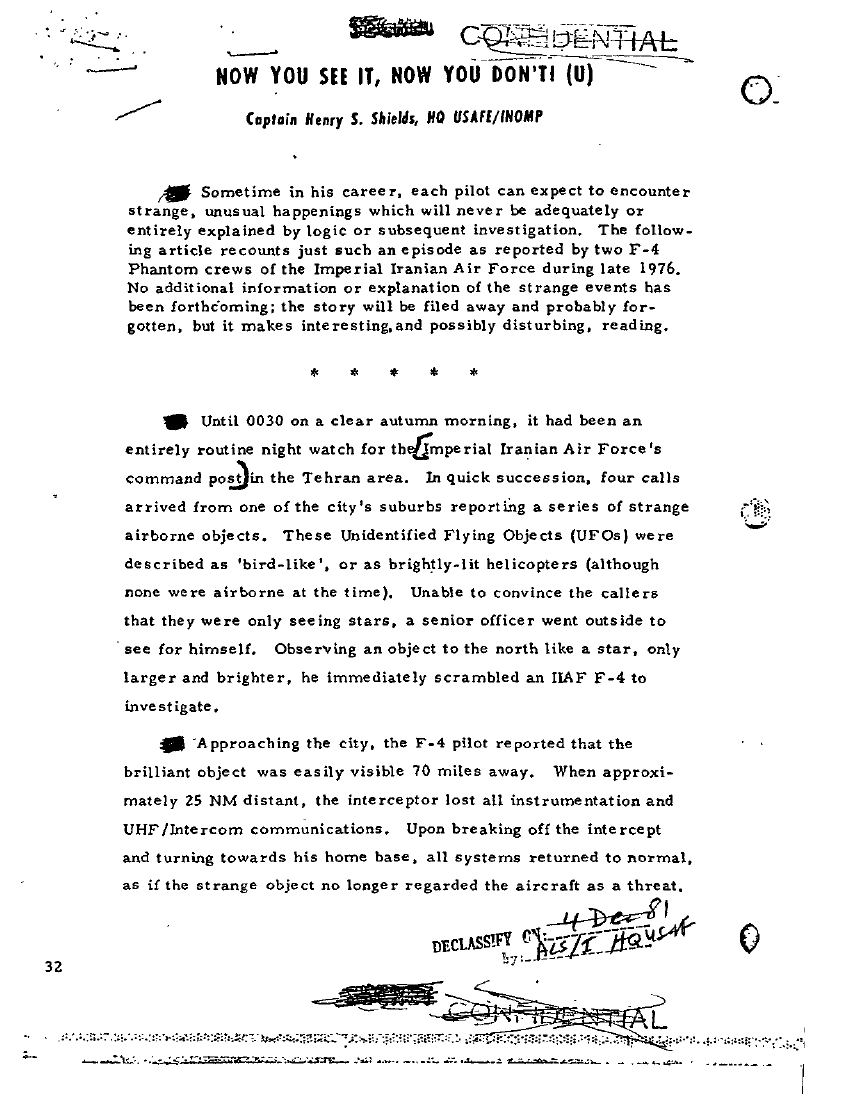
Editorial from the US Air Force MIJI newsletter (page 1)

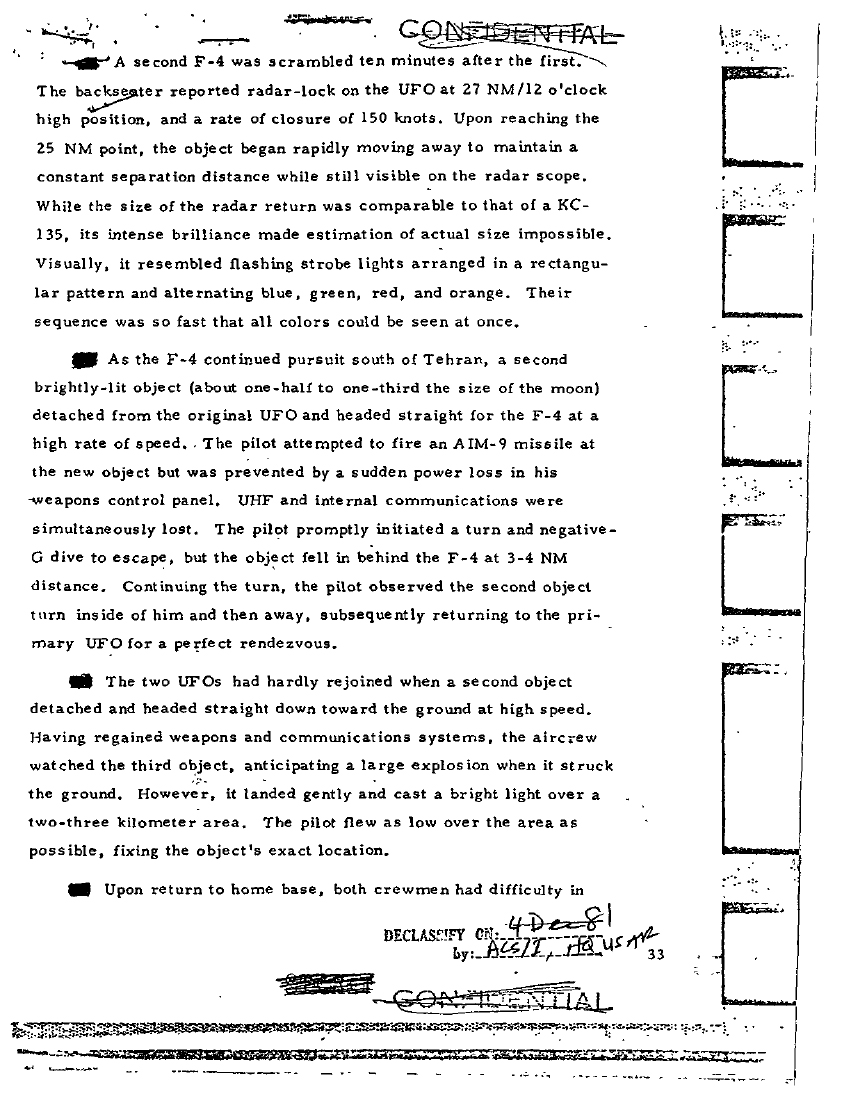
Editorial from the US Air Force MIJI newsletter (page 2)

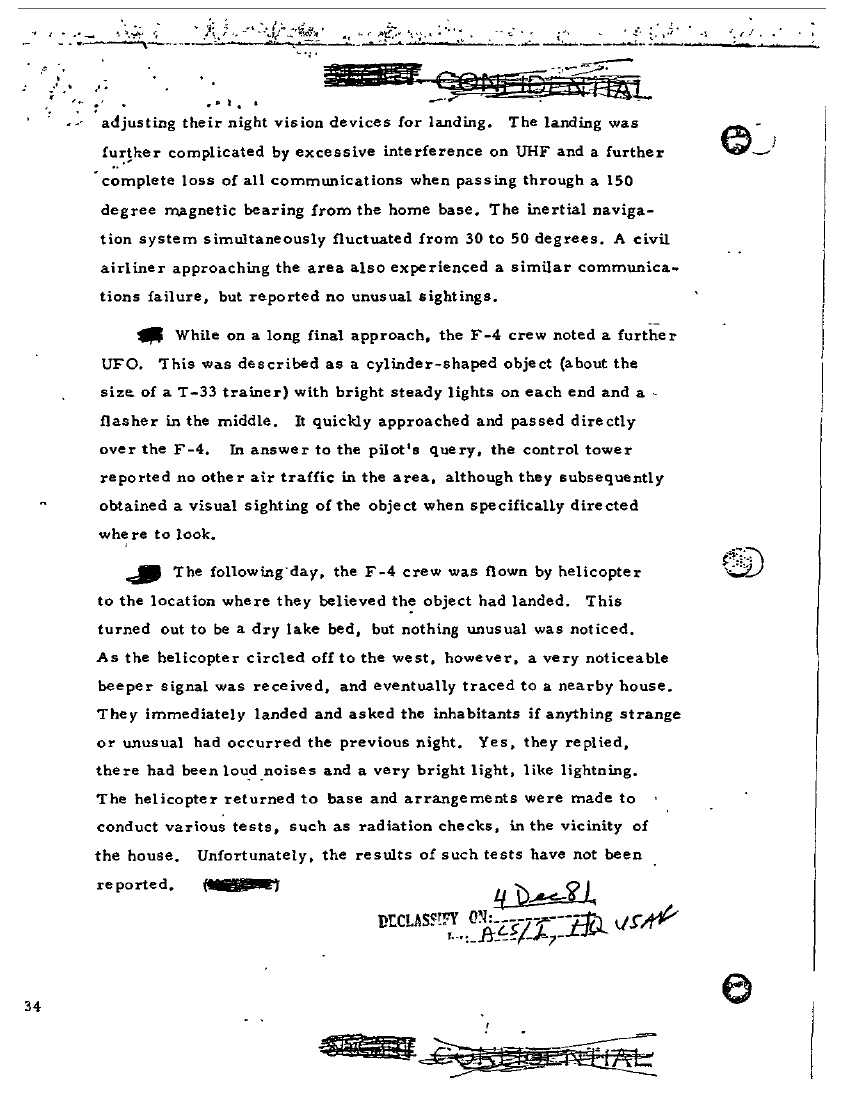
Editorial from the US Air Force MIJI newsletter (page 3)

== See also ==
- UFO sightings in Iran
- List of UFO sightings
