= Natural History Museum of Crete =

- Μουσείο Φυσικής Ιστορίας Κρήτης
- Established: 1981
- Location: Sof. Venizelou Avenue, Heraklion
- Coordinates: 35°20′31″N 25°07′36″E
- Type: Natural history museum
- Website: http://www.nhmc.uoc.gr

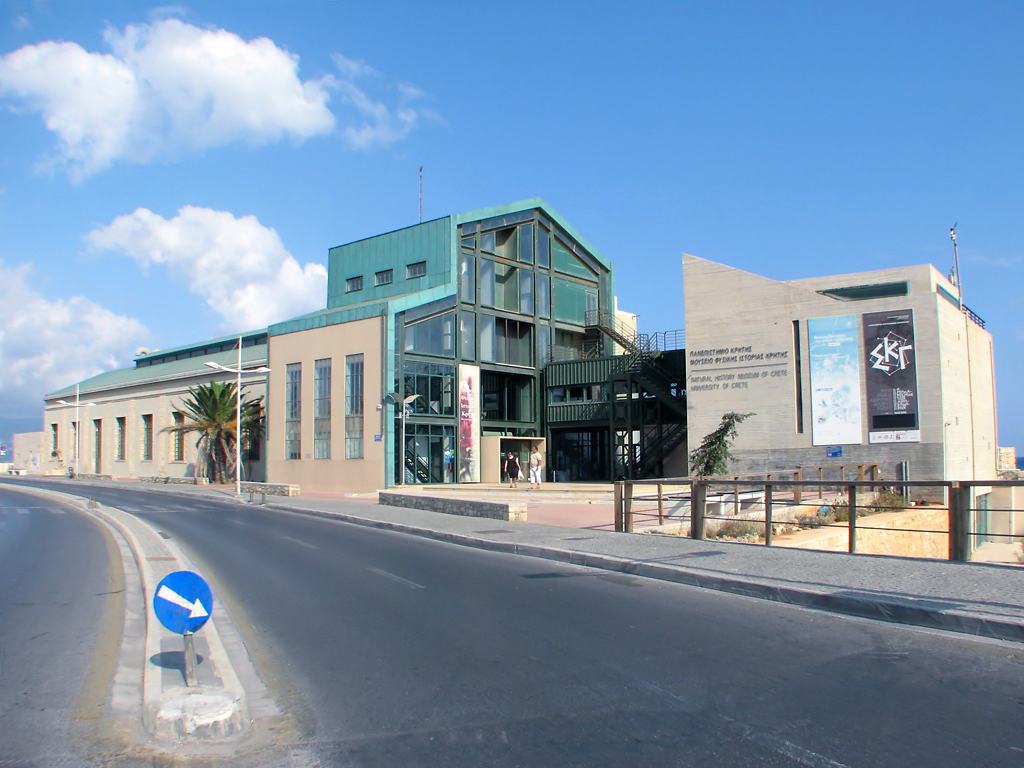
NHMC exterior view

The Natural History Museum of Crete (NHMC) (Greek: Μουσείο Φυσικής Ιστορίας Κρήτης, ΜΦΙΚ) in Heraklion, Crete is a natural history museum that operates under the auspices of the University of Crete. Its aim is the study, protection and promotion of the diverse flora and fauna of the Eastern Mediterranean region. The museum is based in a restored industrial building that used to house an electricity power plant.

The museum is committed to the study, protection, and preservation of the region's unique flora and fauna, as well as its geological and paleontological heritage.

The Natural History Museum of Crete is actively involved in research and educational programs, collaborating with the University of Crete and other institutions. The museum's research focuses on biodiversity, conservation, geology, and paleontology, with an emphasis on the Mediterranean region. Additionally, the museum offers educational programs for schools, as well as workshops, seminars, and public lectures on various topics related to the natural world.

== Awards ==
In late December 2012, NHMC was awarded by the Academy of Athens with the Benaki award for “its diverse educational, research, writing and publishing work, its exemplary organization and its promotion of scientific research and training”.

== Nature Overheard ==
On Earth Day (April 22, 2023), the Natural History Museum introduced the community science project 'Nature Overheard,' exploring the connection between noise pollution and insect populations. The public was invited to participate by recording wildlife observations, providing essential data to understand the natural world.

== See also ==
- Cretaquarium
