= Cretaquarium =

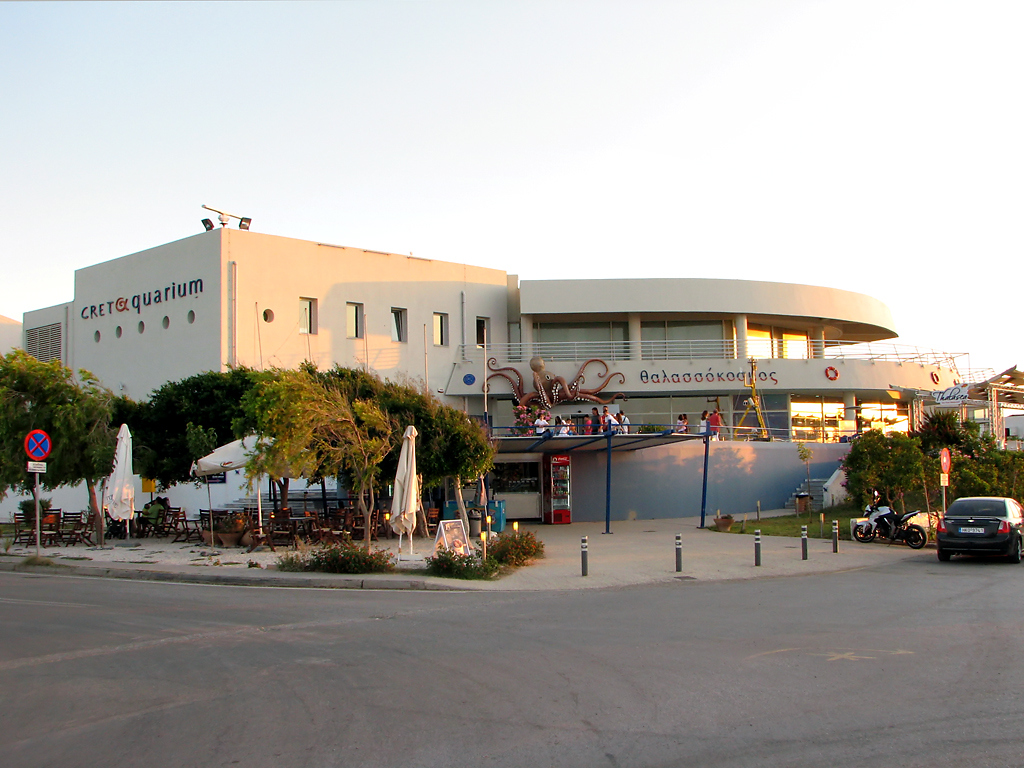
- Main entrance view
- Interactive map of Cretaquarium
- 35.332685°N 25.282474°E
- Date opened: 18 December 2005
- Location: Gournes, Crete, Greece
- Land area: 1.600 m^{2}
- No. of animals: 2,500
- No. of species: 250
- Volume of largest tank: 600,000 lt
- Total volume of tanks: 1,800,000 lt
- Management: Hellenic Centre for Marine Research
- Website: www.cretaquarium.gr

Cretaquarium (Greek: Ενυδρείο Κρήτης, Enidrio Kritis), also known as Thalassocosmos (Greek: Θαλασσόκοσμος, "sea world"), is a public aquarium located near the town of Gournes in Crete, Greece, 15 km east of the city of Heraklion.

== History ==
The Cretaquarium project was conceived by employees of the former Institute of Marine Biology of Crete (IMBC) to create the first large aquarium in Greece, as part of a marine park for research, education, culture and recreation. Its construction was co-financed by the European Investment Bank and the Greek state. Cretaquarium first opened on the site of the former USAF Iraklion Air Station near the town of Gournes in December 2005 and underwent a major expansion during the winter of 2008–9, when 25 new tanks were installed. The aquarium is currently operated by the Hellenic Centre for Marine Research, a public research institution.

== Exhibits ==
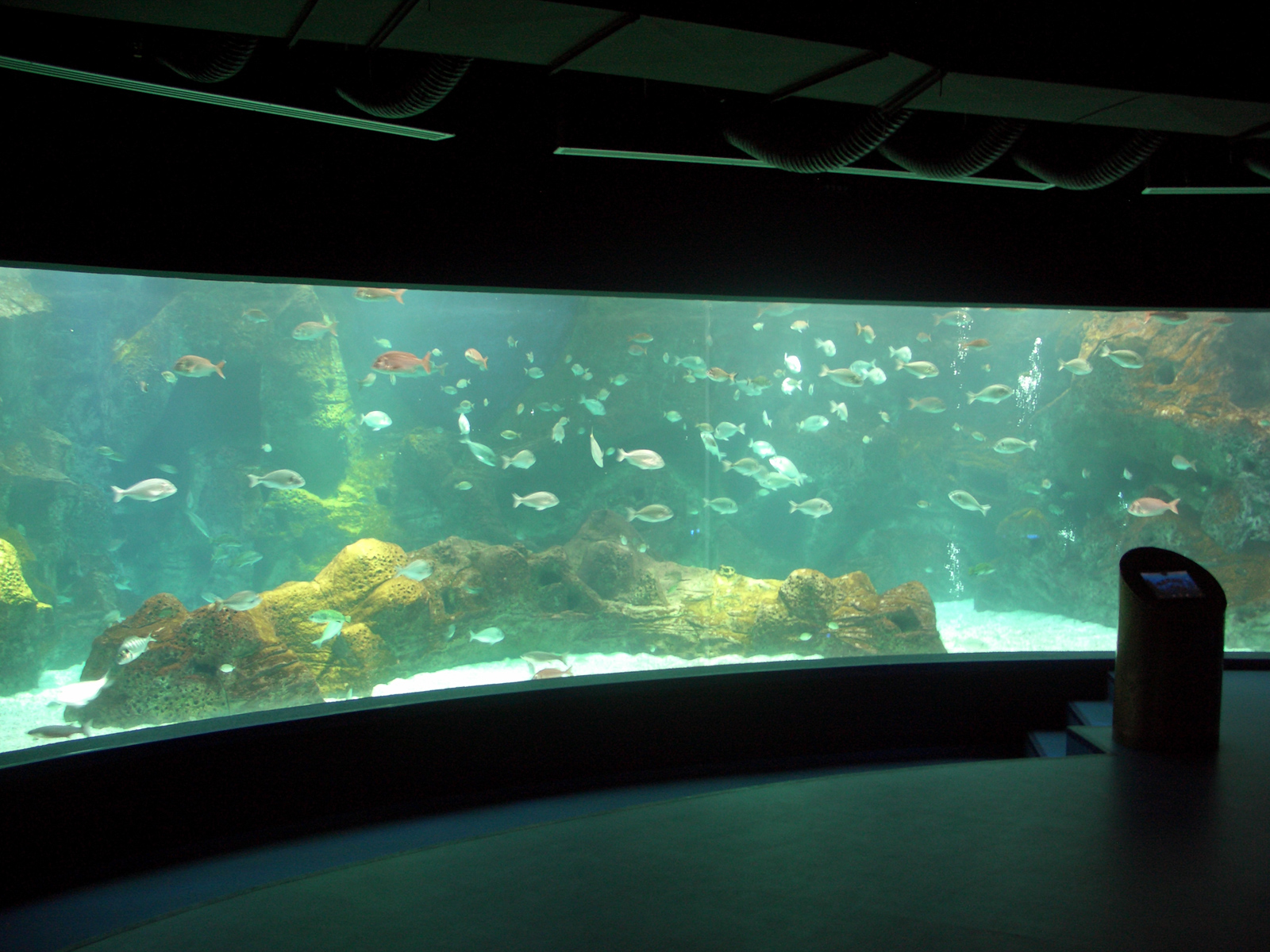
Tank in the "Open Sea" section of Cretaquarium

Cretaquarium is home to more than 2,500 animals of approximately 250 different species, most of which are native to the Mediterranean. It consists of 61 tanks of different sizes, containing a total amount of 1,800,000 liters of water.

The aquarium's exhibits are split into five sections:

=== Playing with the light ===
In the first section of Cretaquarium there are tanks with sea life typically found in caves or great depths; and they are displayed in low light conditions. Some of the species in this section are the red scorpionfish, the common stingray and the dusky grouper.

=== Open Sea ===
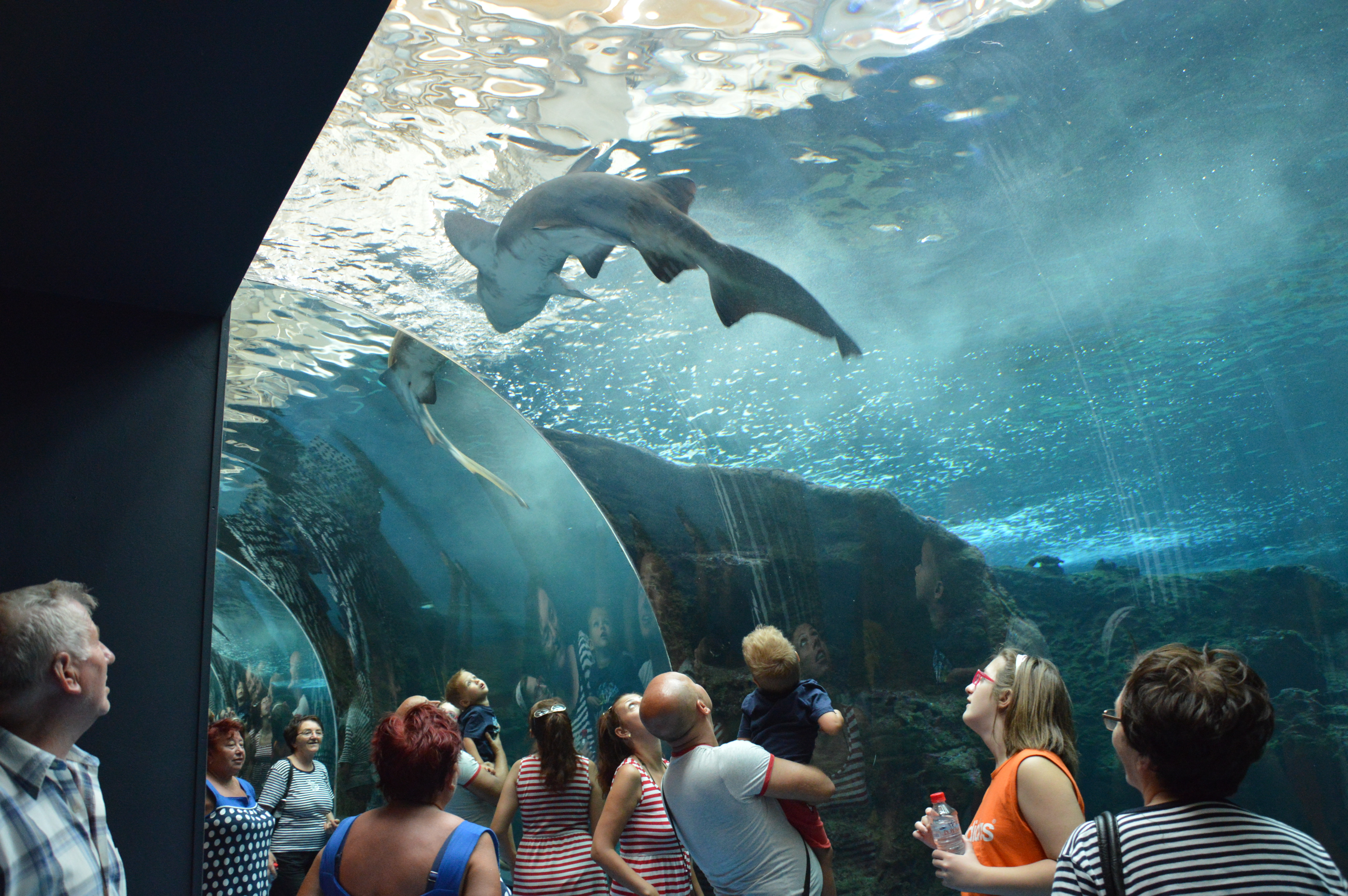
Visitors watching as a shark passes above them at the "Open Sea" section of Cretaquarium

The second section of the aquarium displays animals living in the pelagic zone of the Mediterranean Sea. Both the first and the second largest tanks of the aquarium are in this section, containing 600,000 and 400,000 liters of water each. The scenery in the tanks is inspired from the seabed of Vai and Matala. In the "Open Sea" section visitors can see among others sand tiger sharks and loggerhead sea turtles, as well as common octopuses and Mediterranean slipper lobsters in some smaller tanks.

=== Coastal areas ===
The third section of Cretaquarium is called "Coastal areas" and it displays the biotopes of the coastal zone. Here species like the European spiny lobster, the snakelocks anemone and many more can be found.

=== The Aquarium beyond the glass ===
In this section visitors can see some animals from up close in shallow open tanks and learn about tank-making and how tanks function. Some of the species that are displayed here are the Mediterranean rainbow wrasse and the moon jellyfish.

=== Travelling to the Tropics ===
The last section of the aquarium is dedicated to tropical fish and other marine life found in the tropics, focusing on species that are lessepsian migrants. In this section visitors can see clownfish, spinefoots and other animals.

== Research ==
The Institute of Marine Biology, Biotechnology and Aquaculture of the Hellenic Centre for Marine Research is based on the premises of Cretaquarium; and as a result the experimental scientific research is an important element of the function of the aquarium. Many of the animals living at the aquarium are constantly observed through cameras for the purpose of studying their life cycle and behavior. Particular emphasis is given on species that are lessepsian migrants, in order to understand the impact that these introduced fish have on the marine ecosystem of Greece.

In collaboration with local agencies and environmental organizations, Cretaquarium is also taking care of sick or wounded animals that are then reintroduced into the wild.

== See also ==
- Natural History Museum of Crete
