= 922nd Expeditionary Reconnaissance Squadron =

922d Expeditionary Reconnaissance Squadron

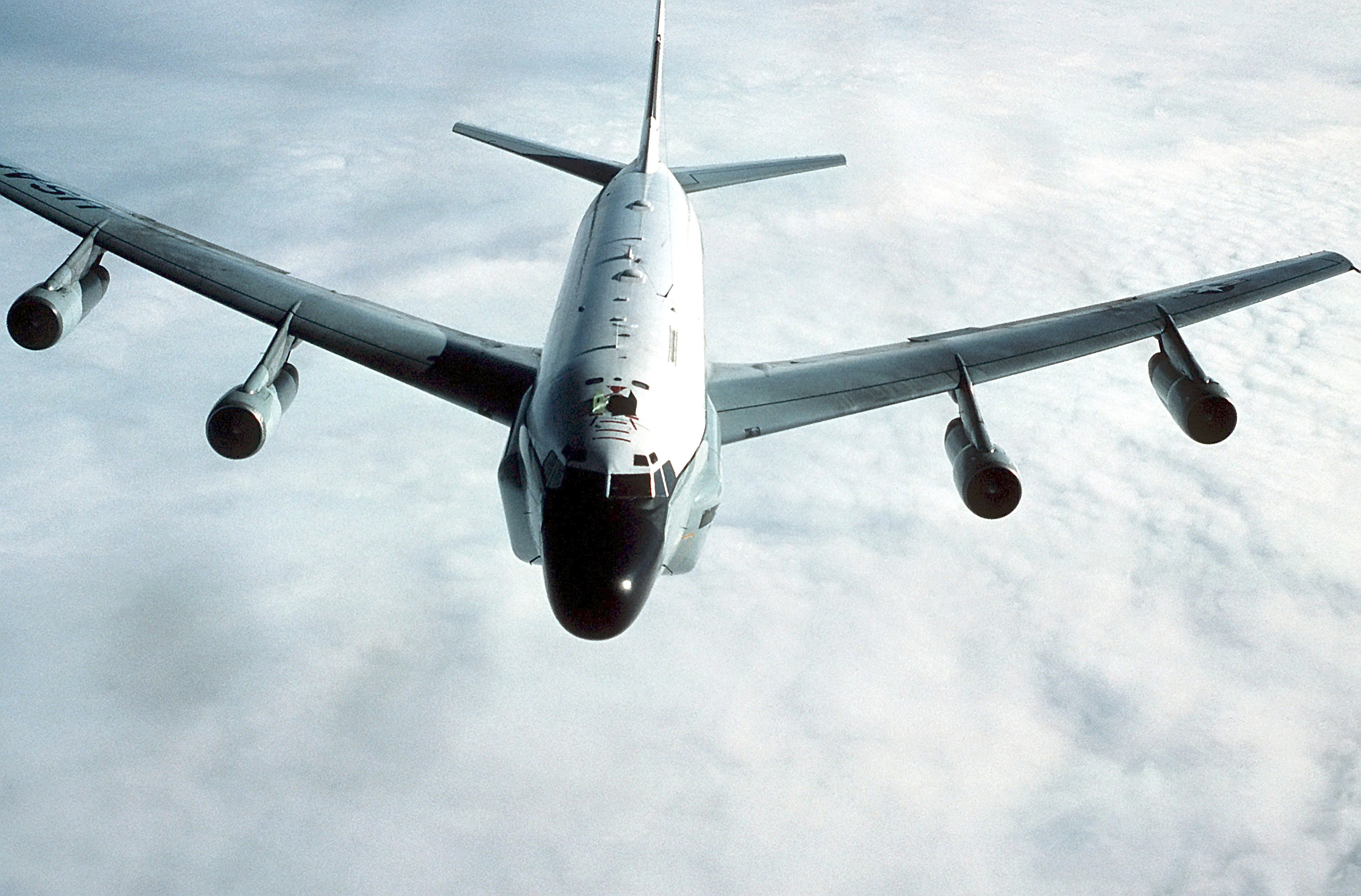
- Deployed RC-135 refueling over the North Sea
- Active: 1942–1943; 1954–1958; 1959–1975: 1978–1994; 2010
- Country: United States
- Branch: United States Air Force
- Role: Reconnaissance
- Part of: Air Combat Command
- Motto: United for Peace
- Decorations: Air Force Outstanding Unit Award

Insignia
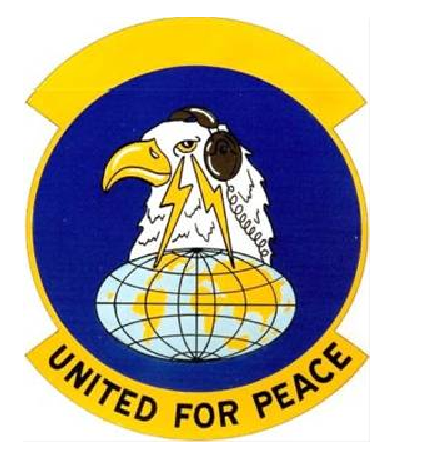
- 922d Expeditionary Reconnaissance Squadron emblem (Note: Approved 23 October 1980.)

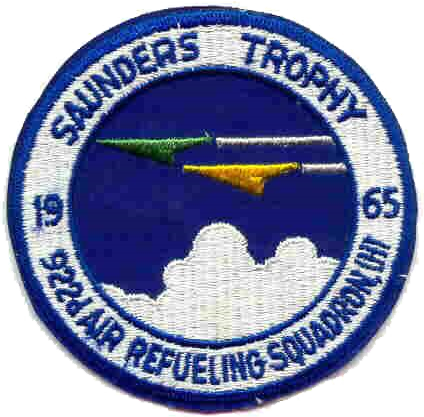
- Patch with 922d Air Refueling Squadron emblem

The 922d Expeditionary Reconnaissance Squadron is a provisional United States Air Force unit, assigned to Air Combat Command to activate or inactivate as needed. It was last assigned to the 474th Air Expeditionary Group at San Isidro Air Base, Dominican Republic in 2010.

The squadron was first activated during World War II as the 22d Air Corps Ferrying Squadron at Morrison Field, Florida in 1942. In October 1943 the squadron and its parent group were disbanded and replaced as the Air Transport Command unit at Morrison by Station 11, Caribbean Wing, Air Transport Command.

The squadron was reconstituted in 1954 as the 22d Air Transport Squadron, Medium, a Douglas C-54 Skymaster unit, at Charleston Air Force Base, South Carolina. The squadron was inactivated in 1958.

The 922d Air Refueling Squadron operated Boeing KC-135 Stratotankers at Wright-Patterson Air Force Base, Ohio from 1959 to 1975, when its parent, the 17th Bombardment Wing moved to Beale Air Force Base, California.

The 922d was reactivated three years later as the 922d Strategic Squadron to control deployed Strategic Air Command (SAC) tanker and reconnaissance aircraft operating in the Mediterranean. In September 1985, the 922d and 22d squadrons were consolidated into a single squadron. When SAC inactivated in 1992, the squadron became a reconnaissance unit, operating Boeing RC-135s from RAF Mildenhall until 1994.

The 922d was converted to provisional status as the 922d Expeditionary Reconnaissance Squadron and assigned to Air Combat Command to activate or inactivate as needed. In 2010 it was activated as part Operation Unified Response. the military response to the earthquake in Haiti.

== History ==
=== Airlift operations ===
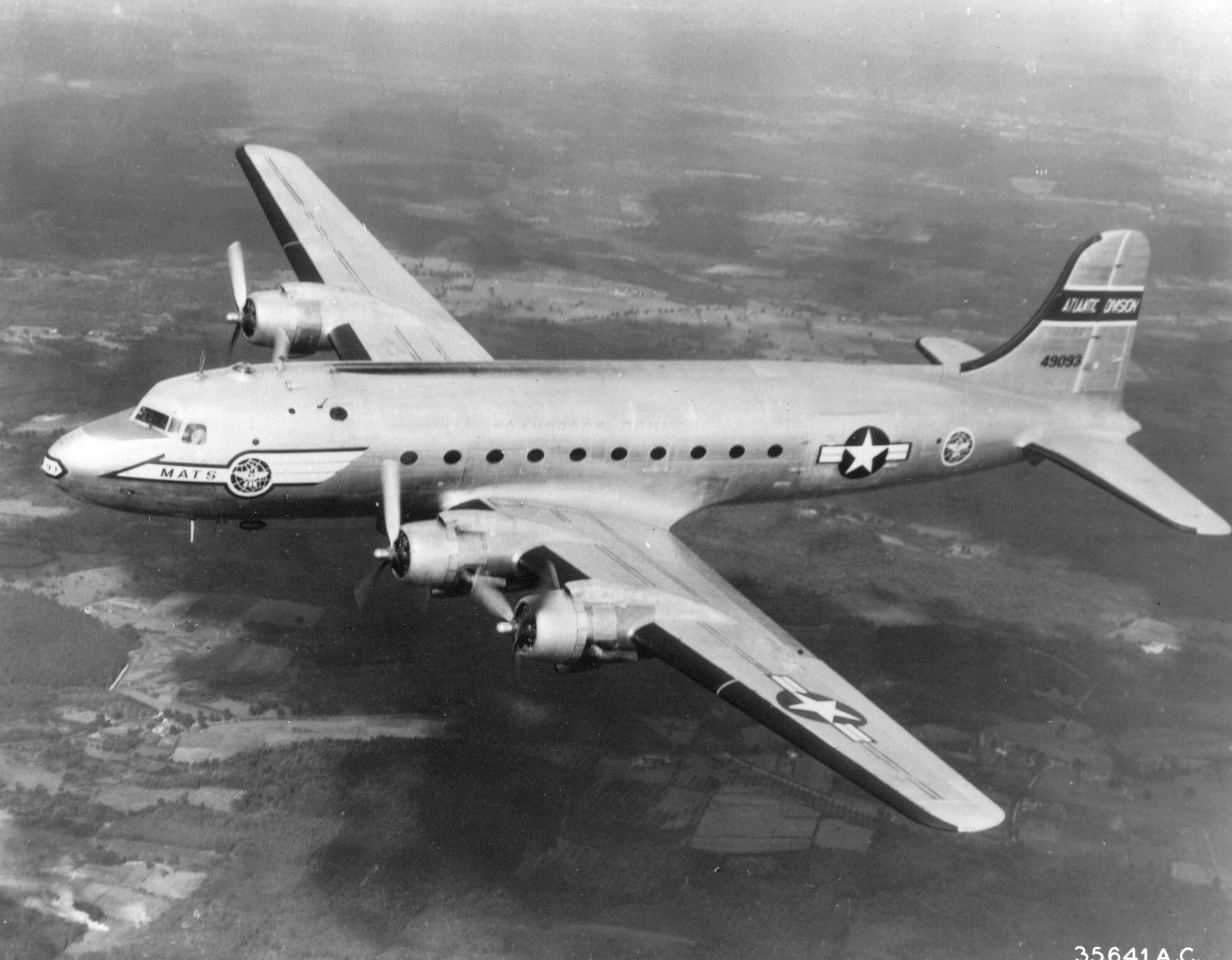
MATS C-54 Skymaster

The squadron was first activated during World War II as the 22d Air Corps Ferrying Squadron at Morrison Field, Florida in 1942. The squadron ferried aircraft between Florida and points in western Africa. From 1943, the unit then focused on the air transportation mission as the 22d Transport Squadron. Although the squadron was stationed at Morrison, its personnel were also used to man other stations of the Caribbean Wing. After a little more than a year of trying to use traditional Table of Organization units like the 22d, Air Transport Command (ATC) found them too inflexible for its operations. It, therefore, decided to replace its groups and squadrons and assign personnel directly to each of its stations, based on the needs of the station. Accordingly, in October 1943 the squadron and its parent group were disbanded as ATC combined its units at Morrison into Station 11, Caribbean Wing, Air Transport Command.

The squadron was reactivated in March 1954 at Charleston Air Force Base, South Carolina as the 22d Air Transport Squadron with the responsibility of transporting personnel, materiel, mail and other strategic cargo for the Army, Navy and civilian agencies. The squadron was assigned to the 1608th Air Transport Group, which had been activated two months earlier. However, shortages of personnel and equipment delayed the group from reaching operational status upon activation. The squadron operated Douglas C-54 Skymaster aircraft until inactivating in March 1958.

=== Air refueling operations ===
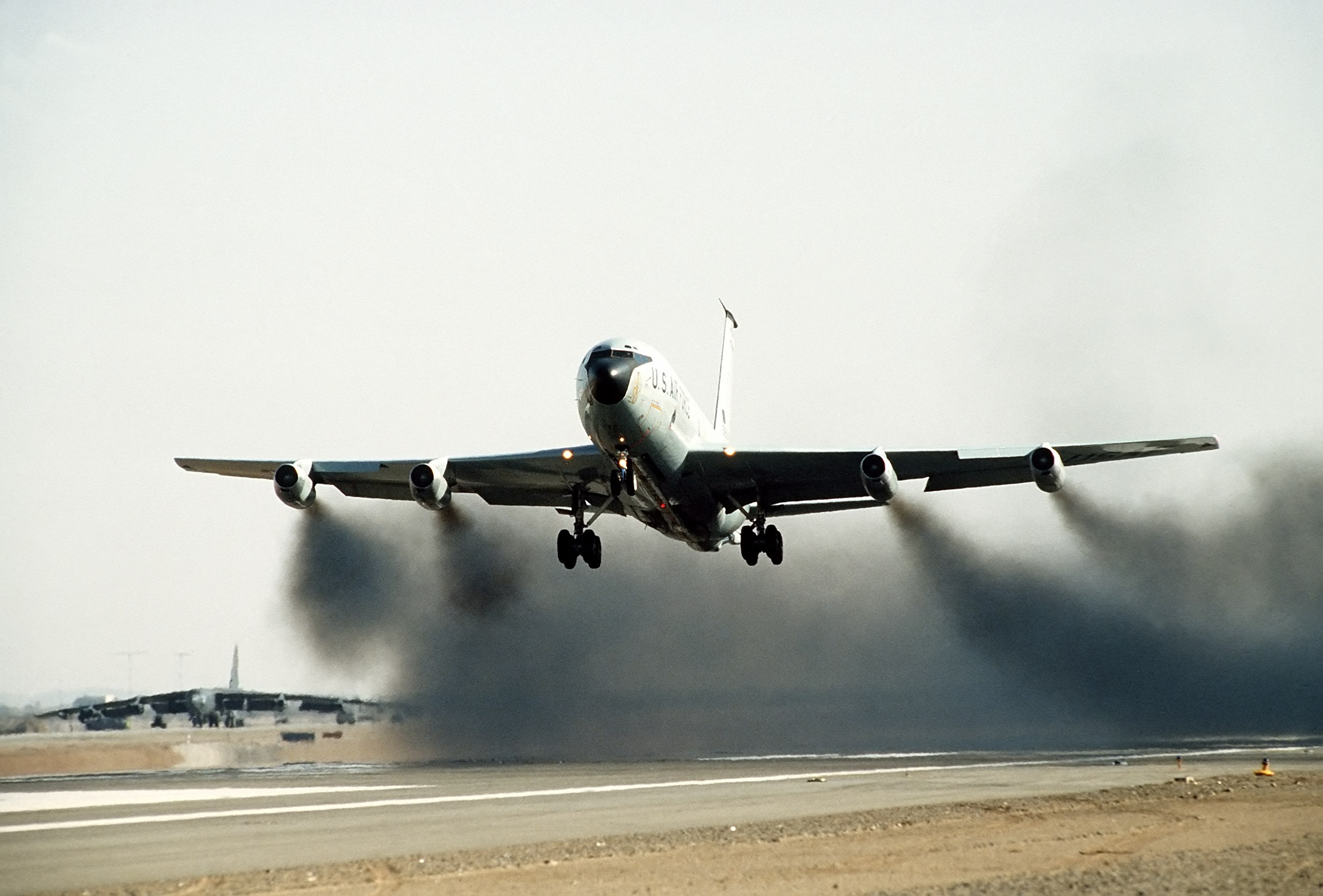
Boeing KC-135A on takeoff

The 922d Air Refueling Squadron was activated on 1 September 1959 by Strategic Air Command (SAC) at Wright-Patterson Air Force Base, Ohio where it was assigned to the 4043d Strategic Wing and equipped with Boeing KC-135 Stratotankers. The 4043d wing was established by SAC in a program to disperse its Boeing B-52 Stratofortress bombers over a larger number of bases, thus making it more difficult for the Soviet Union to knock out the entire fleet with a surprise first strike. SAC bases with large concentrations of bombers made attractive targets. SAC's response was to break up its wings and scatter their aircraft over a larger number of bases.

The squadron provided air refueling support to the Boeing B-52 Stratofortress strategic bombers of its parent wing and other USAF units as directed. Starting in 1960, one third of the squadron's aircraft were maintained on fifteen-minute alert, fully fueled and ready for combat to reduce vulnerability to a Soviet missile strike. This was increased to half the squadron's aircraft in 1962.

In February 1963 The 17th Bombardment Wing assumed the aircraft, personnel and equipment of the discontinued 4043d wing. The 4043d was a Major Command controlled (MAJCON) wing, which could not carry a permanent history or lineage, and SAC wanted to replace it with a permanent unit. The 922d was assigned to the newly activated 17th wing.

The squadron deployed aircraft and aircrews to the Western Pacific support combat operations of deployed SAC units and tactical aircraft over Indochina during the Vietnam War from 1965 to 1975. In June 1975, its aircraft were taken off alert and the squadron phased down, and its aircraft were transferred elsewhere by 7 July. The squadron inactivated in September as SAC ended its operations at Wright-Patterson.

=== Control of deployed forces ===
Three years later the squadron was reactivated as the 922d Strategic Squadron at Hellenikon Air Base, near Athens, Greece. It was assigned to the 306th Strategic Wing, which controlled SAC European operations from its station at Ramstein Air Base, Germany. The squadron provided air refueling and reconnaissance support using aircraft and crews deployed from SAC bases in the United States. It supported USAFE and North Atlantic Treaty Organization exercises. After a period of heightened tensions and anti-American activity in Greece, the Greek government notified the United States that American bases in mainland Greece would be closed by 1990. With the closure of Hellenikon, the squadron moved to Souda Bay Naval Air Station on the Island of Crete. Two years later, in anticipation of the inactivation of SAC, the squadron moved to RAF Mildenhall. and managed deployed Boeing RC-135s from RAF Mildenhall as the 922d Reconnaissance Squadron until 1994.

In 2007, the squadron was assigned to Air Combat Command as a provisional unit to activate or inactivate as needed. In 2010, it was activated in the Dominican Republic for Operation Unified Response, responding to the earthquakes in Haiti on the western half of Hispaniola.

== Lineage ==
22d Air Transport Squadron

- Constituted on 6 April 1942 as the 22d Air Corps Ferrying Squadron

Activated on 21 July 1942
Redesignated 22d Transport Squadron on 29 March 1943
Disbanded on 13 October 1943

- Reconstituted on 27 November 1953 and redesignated 22d Air Transport Squadron, Medium

Activated on 8 March 1954
Inactivated on 18 March 1958
Consolidated with the 922d Strategic Squadron on 19 September 1985 as the 922d Strategic Squadron

922d Expeditionary Reconnaissance Squadron

- Constituted as the 922d Air Refueling Squadron, Heavy on 18 August 1959

Activated on 1 December 1959
Inactivated on 30 September 1975

- Redesignated 922d Strategic Squadron on 13 June 1978

Activated on 1 July 1978
Consolidated with the 22d Air Transport Squadron on 19 September 1985
Redesignated 922d Reconnaissance Squadron on 31 March 1992
Inactivated on 30 June 1994.

- Converted to provisional status and redesignated 922d Expeditionary Reconnaissance Flight on 5 October 2007
- Redesignated 922d Expeditionary Reconnaissance Squadron

Activated for Operation Unified Response on 2 February 2010
Inactivated on 20 June 2010

=== Assignments ===
- 15th Ferrying Group (later 15th Transport Group): 21 July 1942 – 13 October 1943
- 1608th Air Transport Group: 8 March 1954 – 18 March 1958
- 4043d Strategic Wing: 1 December 1959
- 17th Bombardment Wing: 1 February 1963 – 30 September 1975
- 306th Strategic Wing: 1 July 1978
- 55th Operations Group: 31 March 1992
- 55th Wing: 1 June 1992
- 55th Operations Group: 1 July 1992 – 30 June 1994
- Air Combat Command to activate or inactivate as needed after 5 October 2007

474th Air Expeditionary Group: 2 February 2010 – 20 June 2010

=== Stations ===
- Morrison Field, Florida, 3 April 1942 – 13 October 1943
- Charleston Air Force Base, South Carolina, 8 March 1954 – 18 March 1958
- Wright-Patterson Air Force Base, Ohio, 1 December 1959 – 30 September 1975
- Hellenikon Air Base, Greece, 1 July 1978
- Souda Bay Naval Air Station, Greece, 15 April 1990
- RAF Mildenhall, England, 31 March 1992 – 30 June 1994
- San Isidro Air Base, Dominican Republic, 2 February 2010 – 20 June 2010

=== Aircraft ===
- Douglas C-54 Skymaster, 1954–1958
- Boeing KC-135 Stratotanker, 1959–1975, 1978–1992
- Boeing RC-135, 1992–1994

=== Awards and campaigns ===
Award streamer	Award	Dates	Notes
	Air Force Outstanding Unit Award	1 July 1963 – 31 Mar 1964	922d Air Refueling Squadron
	Air Force Outstanding Unit Award	1 July 1969 – 30 June 1970	922d Air Refueling Squadron
	Air Force Outstanding Unit Award	1 July 1971 – 30 June 1973	922d Air Refueling Squadron
	Air Force Outstanding Unit Award	1 July 1979 – 30 June 1981	922d Strategic Squadron
	Air Force Outstanding Unit Award	1 July 1985 – 30 June 1987	922d Strategic Squadron
	Air Force Outstanding Unit Award	1 July 1987 – 30 June 1989	922d Strategic Squadron
	Air Force Outstanding Unit Award	1 July 1989 – 30 June 1990	922d Strategic Squadron
	Air Force Outstanding Unit Award	1 July 1990 – 28 February 1991	922d Strategic Squadron
	Air Force Outstanding Unit Award	1 March 1991 – 31 March 1992	922d Strategic Squadron
	Air Force Outstanding Unit Award	1 July 1992 – 30 June 1994	922d Reconnaissance Squadron

- Saunders Perpetual Trophy, SAC Combat Competition for best combined score in refueling and navigation: 1965

Campaign Streamer	Campaign	Dates	Notes
	American Theater without inscription	3 April 1942 – 13 October 1943	22d Ferrying Squadron (later 22d Transport Squadron)

== See also ==
- Air Transport Command
- List of United States Air Force air refueling squadrons
