= Iraklion Air Station =

Former U.S. military base on Crete, Greece

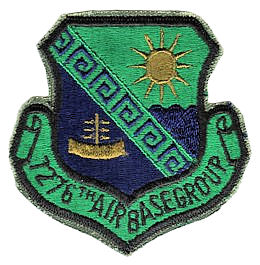
Iraklion Air Station
- Part of Air Force Intelligence Command (AFIC)
- Located adjacent to Gournes, Crete
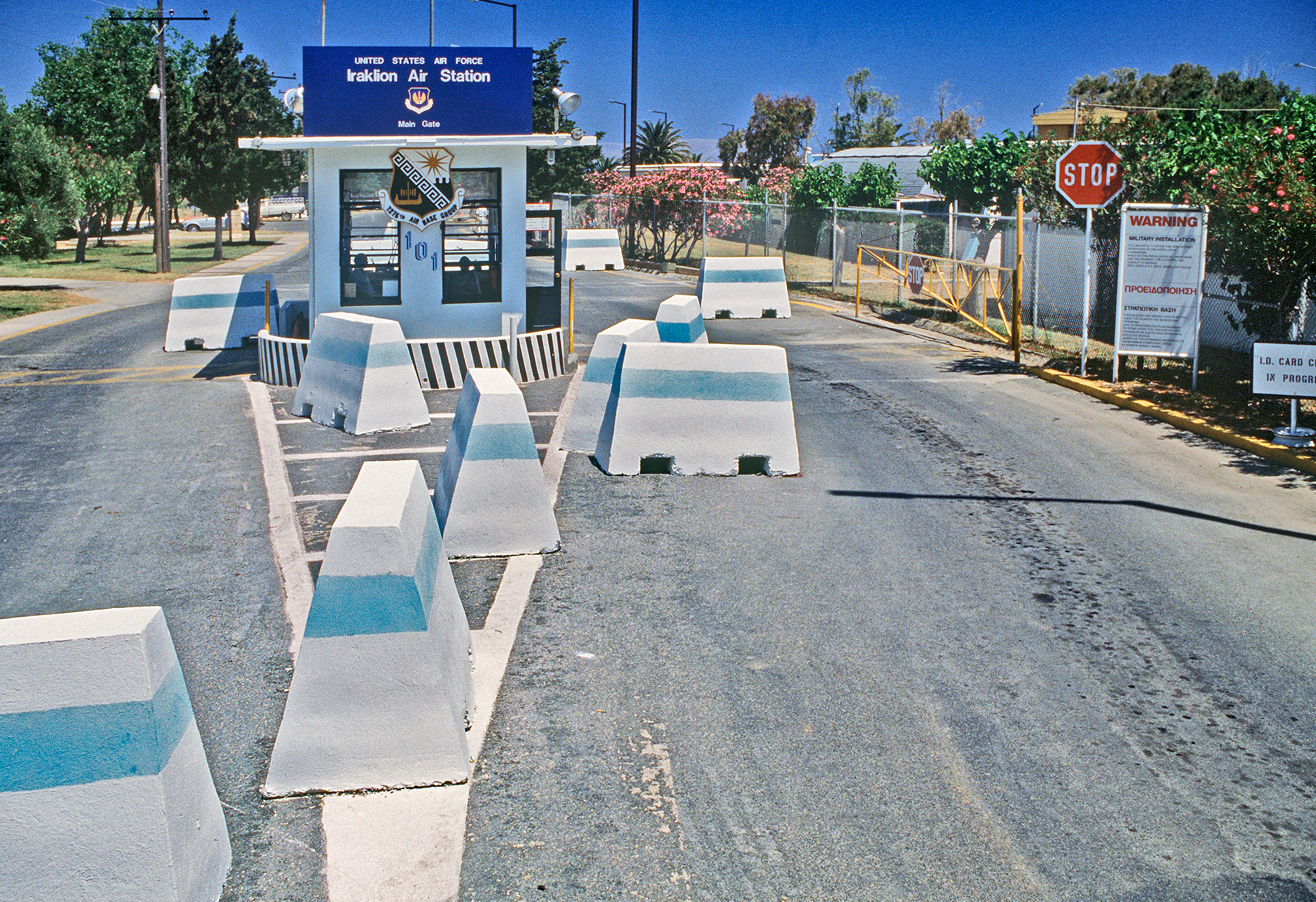
- Front gate at Iraklion Air Station in 1987

Site information
- Type: Military Air Station
- Controlled by: United States Air Force

Location
- Location of Iraklion Air Station, Crete
- Coordinates: 35°19′48″N 025°17′07″E

Site history
- Built: 1954
- In use: 1954–1993

Garrison information
- Garrison: 7276th Air Base Group

Iraklion Air Station was a United States Air Force facility located 16 kilometers (9.9 mi) east of the city of Iraklion near the village of Gournes, in the north central section of the Greek island of Crete.

== History ==
=== Major commands to which assigned ===
Detachment 2, 34th Radio Squadron Mobile, USAFSS, 1953–1955

- United States Air Forces in Europe, 1954–1979
- U.S. Air Force Electronic Security Command, 1979–1991
- Air Force Intelligence Command, 1991–1993

=== Major units assigned ===
- Det 2, 34th Radio Squadron Mobile, USAFSS 1953–1955
- Det 1, 1603rd Air Transport Wing (MATS), 1 October 1954 – January 1966
- 6938th Radio Squadron Mobile (RSM), April 1955
- 7222nd Air Base Squadron, 1 August 1955 – 1 January 1958
- Det 1, 7,206th Spt Group, 1 January 1958
- 6930th Radio Group, Mobile (RGM) [6,931st Scty Gp], 1 April 1958 – 1 July 1963

Redesignated: 6931st Security Group (SG) 1 July 1963-1 October 1978

- 6931st Security Squadron (SS), 1 July 1974 – 1 October 1979

Redesignated: 6931st Electronic Security Squadron (ESS), 1 October 1979 – 30 September 1993

- 7276th Air Base Group, 1 October 1978 – 30 June 1994
- 2115th Communications Squadron, 2 March 1979 – 30 September 1993
- USAF Hospital Iraklion 1954–1993

=== Operational history ===
A non-flying facility, Iraklion Air Station (Iraklion AS) began operations in support of activities of the 1603rd Air Transport Wing and other USAFE liaison operations in Crete beginning on 5 October 1954. The base also supported units of USAFSS, USAFE and NATO as directed. The base provided administrative and logistical support to the 6931st Electronic Security Squadron, as well as policy guidance in administrative, logistical and support matters for all regular and other tenant organizations at Iraklion AS, and as well as other dispersed U.S. Department of Defense units located on the island of Crete from October 1, 1978, until the closure of the base in 1994. Iraklion AS also provided liaison and base support services for the Embassy of the United States, Athens.

Since the station's closure in 1994, the facility has been abandoned and appears to have been looted and vandalized. It is in an unkempt state being taken over by weeds. Currently, an aquarium known as the Cretaquarium, a dinosaur park and an animal shelter are housed at the site.

== Future ==
In 2020, it was reported that the United States and Greece were considering the reactivation of the station as a base for U.S. Air Force combat and strategic assets, in lieu of Incirlik Air Base in Turkey.
