= Izmir Air Station =

United States Air Force facility in İzmir, Turkey

Coordinates: 38.4575°N 27.1705°E

Izmir Air Station is a United States Air Force facility in İzmir, Turkey. It is located 320 km (200 mi) SSW of Istanbul, on the western coast of Turkey.

== History ==
U.S. responsibilities in the İzmir area began on September 8, 1952 with the activation of Allied Land Forces South-Eastern Europe and the arrival on October 14, 1953 of the Sixth Allied Tactical Air Force at Sirinyer Garrison south of İzmir. The United States Navy supported these and other Allied Forces Southern Europe organizations, while Detachment 2, 7206th Air Base Squadron, supported USAF installations in the area after April 1, 1954.

The United States Air Forces in Europe (USAFE) assumed support responsibility for U.S. and NATO entities in the İzmir area on January 1, 1956. USAFE assumed support responsibility for all U.S. and NATO units based at Çiğli Air Base and off-base installations of Çiğli situated throughout the İzmir area on July 6, 1962.

Improvements to Çiğli AB consisted of concrete roofs of jet fuel tanks repaired and new water lines, fire hydrants and electric power lines installed during 1962, and a reinforced concrete pad for wing-tank loading built at the north hangar and air conditioning installed in dependent quarters during 1963. Cigli AB gained control of all support activities in and around İzmir on April 1, 1966.

== Turkish Air Force ==
The Turkish Air Force assumed control of Cigli AB on July 1, 1970, and Izmir AS then assumed support responsibility for U.S. and USAF units in the İzmir area, with Cigli relegated to standby base status. Following a shooting of a Turkish national border policeman in 1983, NATO was asked to coordinate all activities more closely with command.

Allied Air Command İzmir was activated at General Vecihi Akin Garrison (GVAG), Sirinyer, in 2004.

Allied Air Command İzmir was succeeded by Allied Land Command, also at İzmir, from December 2012.
