= Hellenic Centre for Marine Research =

Greek governmental research organization

- Ελληνικό Κέντρο Θαλάσσιων Ερευνών; Elliniko Kentro Thalassion Erevnon
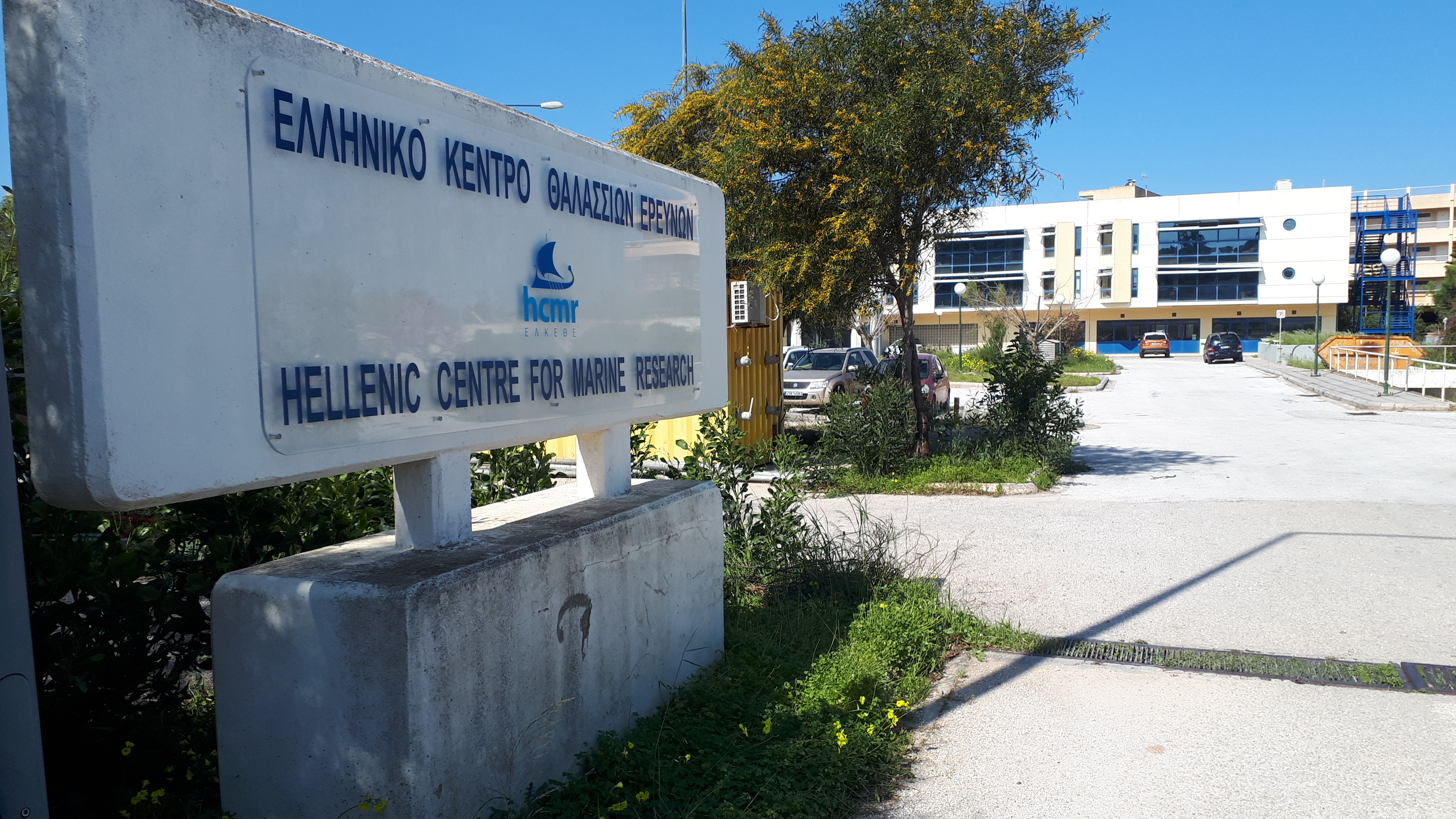
- The TRITON marine research park, headquarters of HCMR

Agency overview
- Formed: June 3, 2003
- Preceding agencies: National Centre for Marine Research; Institute of Marine Biology of Crete
- Type: Research organization
- Jurisdiction: General Secretariat for Research and Innovation of the Ministry of Development and Investment
- Headquarters: Anavyssos, Greece
- Agency executive: Antonios Magoulas, President of the Board of Directors and Director of HCMR
- Child agencies: Institute of Marine Biology, Biotechnology and Aquaculture; Institute of Marine Biological Resources and Inland Waters; Institute of Oceanography
- Website: https://www.hcmr.gr/en/

The Hellenic Centre for Marine Research (HCMR) (Greek: Ελληνικό Κέντρο Θαλάσσιων Ερευνών, ΕΛ.ΚΕ.ΘΕ.) is a Greek governmental research organisation, focusing on various fields of marine science. It is operating multiple facilities across Greece, which include scientific laboratories, public aquaria and experimental tanks. It also owns three research vessels, a crewed submersible and several Remotely Operated Vehicles for underwater exploration. Additionally, its activities encompass conservation projects and educational programs for the public.

== History ==
In 1912, the Greek government decided to create the first Greek marine research institute and consulted the director of the Ichthyological Station of Rome, professor Decio Vinciguerra. With his suggestions, the Marine Hydrobiological Station was established in 1914 and was located in Palaio Faliro. 34 years later, in 1948, it came under the direction of the Ministry of Agriculture (now Ministry of Rural Development and Food) and it was renamed Laboratory of Fisheries Studies.

In 1945, after the Second World War, the Hellenic Hydrobiological Institute of the Academy of Athens was founded in Piraeus, incorporating the Hydrobiological Station of Rhodes which had been set up by the Italians during their occupation of the Dodecanese.

Two decades later, in 1965, it merged with the Laboratory of Fisheries Studies forming the Institute of Oceanographic and Fisheries Research, which would then evolve to the National Centre for Marine Research in 1985. It was now a public sector organisation under the jurisdiction of the General Secretariat of Research and Technology, part of the Ministry of Industry, Energy and Technology (now Ministry of Development).

In 1987, the Institute of Marine Biology of Crete was established in Heraklion. This institute was amalgamated with the National Centre for Marine Research on June 3, 2003; forming the Hellenic Centre for Marine Research. This new organisation is a public sector body operating under the supervision of the General Secretariat for Research and Innovation of the Ministry of Development and Investments.

== Research institutes ==
The Hellenic Centre for Marine Research comprises three research institutes:

- Institute of Marine Biology, Biotechnology and Aquaculture
- Institute of Marine Biological Resources and Inland Waters
- Institute of Oceanography

== Fleet ==
=== Μanned submersible ===
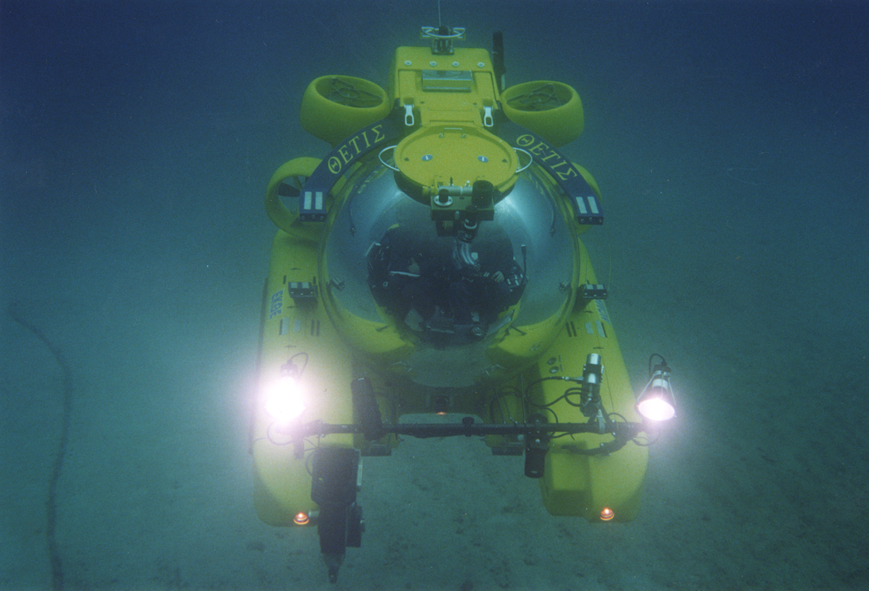
THETIS submersible of the Hellenic Centre for Marine Research

The Hellenic Centre for Marine Research is operating a Remora 2000 type submersible named THETIS, which was constructed by COMEX in 1999. It has a crew capacity of two; and can dive at a depth of 610 metres (2,000 ft), while moving at a speed of 2.5 knots. It can operate for as much as nine hours, though missions normally do not last for more than six hours. Its two robotic arms have the ability to lift objects of up to 100 kilograms (220 lb). THETIS is deployed by R/V AEGAEO and it has a special intercom system for communication with the ship. The purchase cost of the submersible was €2,069,000.

=== Research vessels ===
| Image | Name | Type | Built/refitted | Length | Breadth | Crew | Home port | Citation |
|---|---|---|---|---|---|---|---|---|
| | Aegaeo | Research vessel | 1985/1997 | 61.51m | 9.6m | 21 | Piraeus | |
| | Philia | Fisheries research vessel | 1986/1997 | 26.10m | 7.25m | 13 | Heraklion | |
| | Alcyone | Survey vessel | 2009 | 13.40m | 3.7m | 2 | Rhodes | |

=== Remotely operated vehicles ===
| Name | Origin | Constructor | Type | Weight | Payload | Max depth | Mothership | Citations |
|---|---|---|---|---|---|---|---|---|
| ROV Super Achille | France | COMEX | Super Achille | 120 kg | 10 kg | 1000 m | Aegaeo or Philia | |
| ROV Max Rover | USA | Deep Sea Systems International | Max Rover Mark II | 850 kg | 100 kg | 2000 m | Aegaeo or Philia | |
| ROV Seaeye Falcon | UK | Saab Seaeye | Falcon | 650 kg | 16 kg | 300 m | Alcyone | |
| ROV Seabotix LBV | USA | Seabotix | LBV 200 | 12 kg | 3 kg | 200 m | Any | |

== Facilities ==
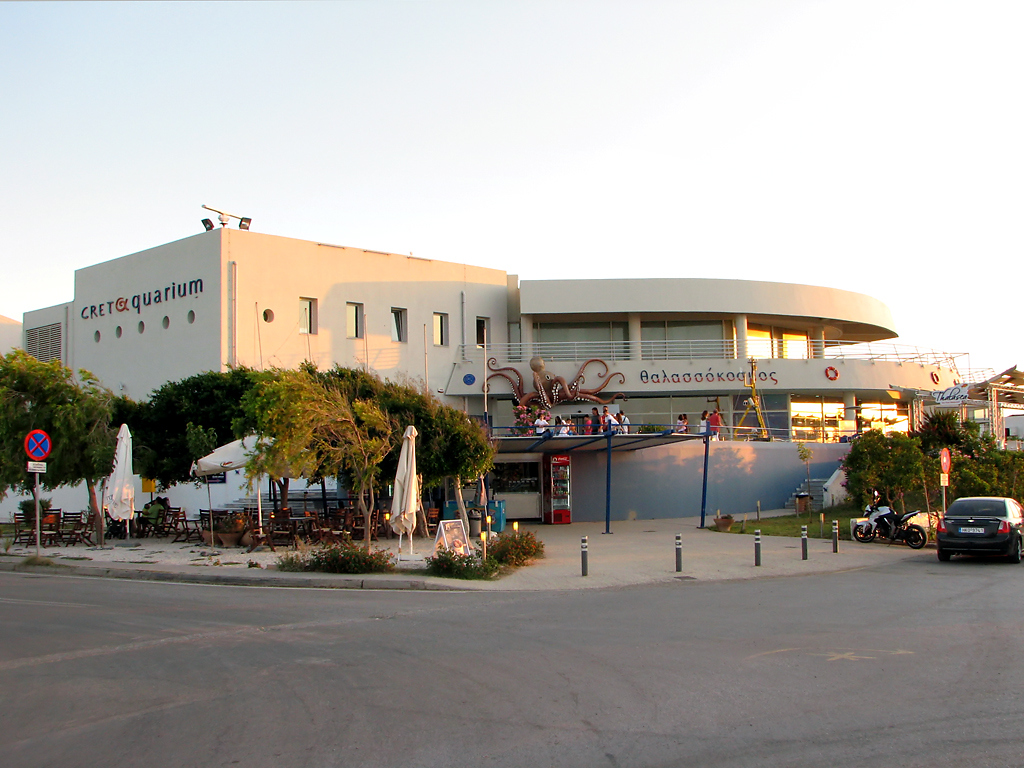
Cretaquarium, a public aquarium operated by the Hellenic Centre for Marine Research

=== TRITON marine research park ===
The TRITON ultra-modern marine research park is the headquarters of the Hellenic Centre for Marine Research. It is a three-story building situated in Anavyssos and it houses 34 laboratories, 65 offices, a library, a computer centre, a 200 seats auditorium and two small conference rooms with a seating capacity of 30 to 40. In the facility the Research Institutes of Oceanography and of Inland Waters, the Educational Unit, the Maritime Service Unit and the Underwater Activities Unit are hosted.

=== Agios Kosmas offices and laboratories ===
It is a two-story building in the Agios Kosmas area of Elliniko with offices and laboratories of the Institute of Marine Biological Resources and Institute of Aquaculture. At the facility there are indoor tanks and an external space with outdoor ones.

=== Hydrobiological Station of Rhodes ===
The Hydrobiological Station of Rhodes is a research centre, a public aquarium and a museum located on the island of Rhodes. It is an important research institute on physics, chemistry, biology and geology of the seas and the inner waters, at national and international level. Some of its most famous exhibits include the embalmed body of a Cuvier's beaked whale; and a 2000 years old skeleton of a Mediterranean monk seal that was found inside a grave in an archaeological site at the port of Rhodes.

=== Cretaquarium ===
Cretaquarium is the largest public aquarium in Greece and it consists of 61 tanks with a total amount of 1.800.000 litres of water. It is located in Gournes, near Heraklion in Crete. Research is conducted at the aquarium by the constant observation of some of the animals living there with cameras, for the purpose of studying their behavior and life cycle. Cretaquarium is also taking care of wounded or sick animals that are then reintroduced into the wild, in collaboration with local agencies and environmental organisations.

=== Aqualabs ===
The HCMR-Aqualabs-Cages infrastructure is the largest facility for marine experimental tanks in the Mediterranean; it consists of inland installations, net-pen cages and analytical laboratories. In Aqualabs is conducted multidisciplinary research about the reproduction, development, nutrition, pathology and husbandry of many Mediterranean species, like the European seabass, the gilt-head bream and the sharpsnout seabream, as well as non-native species like the greater amberjack, the meagre and the Atlantic wreckfish.

== Research ==
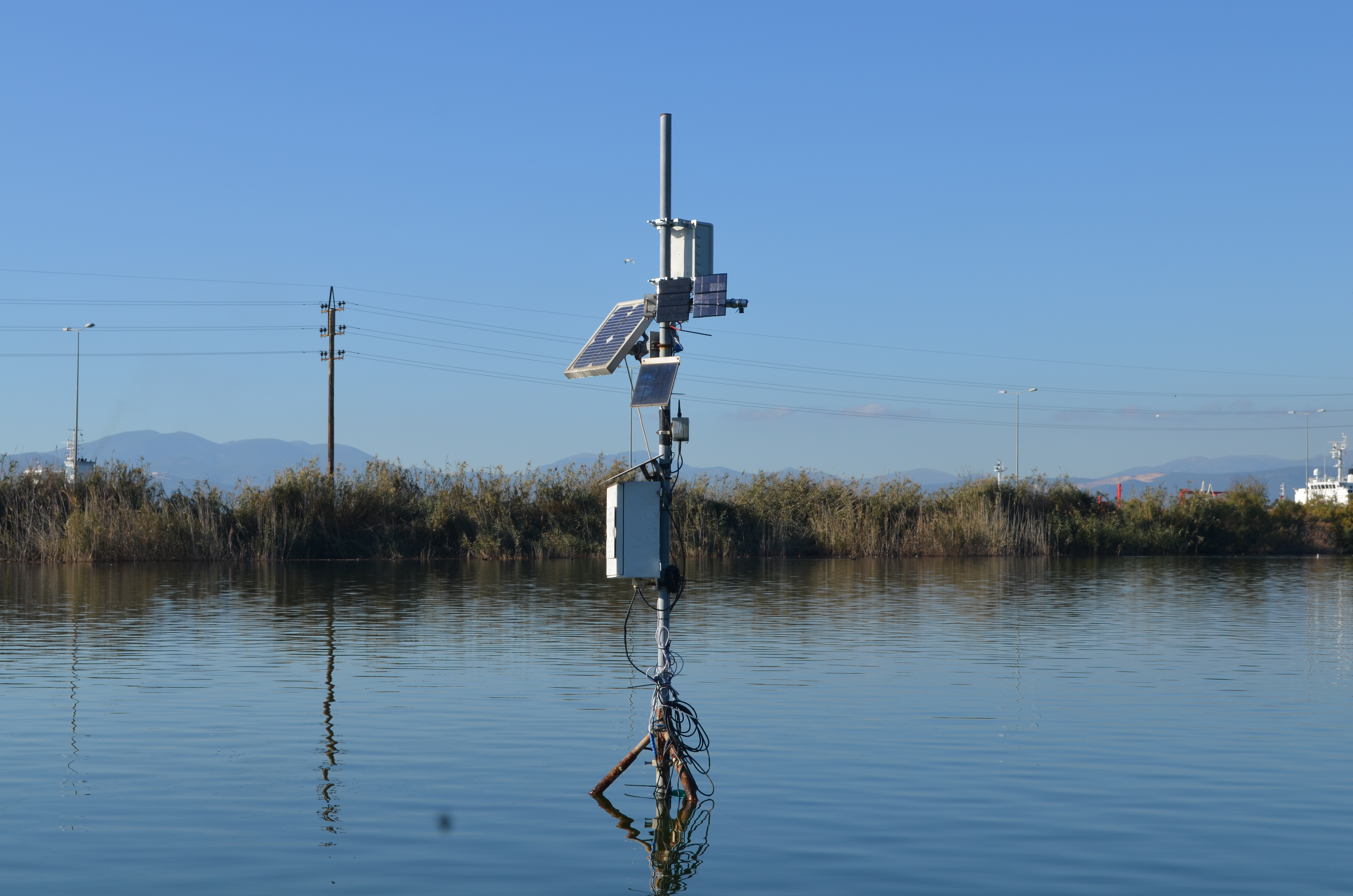
Automatic telemetric water quality and quantity measuring station of the IMBRIW

The Hellenic Centre for Marine Research is conducting research mainly in the following areas:

- Structure and functioning of inland, coastal and marine ecosystems, including ecosystem modeling
- Aquatic biodiversity at all levels
- Integrated marine observing and forecasting systems in the Greek seas
- The role of climatic change in the evolution of marine and terrestrial aquatic ecosystems
- Effects of natural and human-induced pressures and hazards on the marine environment
- Life cycle of fish, fisheries dynamics, fisheries ecology, modelling and management
- Aquaculture of fish and other organisms
- Population genetics and genomics of marine organisms
- Biotechnological applications
- Integrated river basin and coastal zone management

== Publications ==
The Publications Department of the Hellenic Centre for Marine Research is responsible for the publication of scientific articles, monographs, periodicals, textbooks, conference proceedings, workshops, brochures and other publications. The publications of the HCMR include:

=== Mediterranean Marine Science ===
The journal Mediterranean Marine Science is a scientific journal that is issued in three volumes annually. It focuses on aquatic science, oceanography, environmental engineering and ecology, evolution, behavior and systematics.

=== Monographs on Marine Sciences ===
Monographs on Marine Sciences is a non periodical scientific publication of the Hellenic Center for Marine Research. It consists of monographs focused on integral themes of marine sciences in general.

=== Special publications ===
The Hellenic Centre for Marine Research makes special publications from time to time. As of 2025, it has published two ebooks: the State of the Hellenic Marine Environment; published in 2005, and the State of Hellenic Fisheries; published in 2007.
