= Hellenikon Air Base =

Decommissioned US Air Force Base in Athens

- IATA: none; ICAO: none

Summary
- Airport type: Military
- Operator: Closed
- Location: Athens
- Elevation AMSL: 21 m / 68 ft
- Coordinates: 37°53′54″N 23°43′46″E
- Interactive map of Hellenikon Air Base

Runways
Direction	Length		Surface
Direction	m	ft	Surface
15L/33R	3,500	11,483	Paved
15R/33L	3,148	10,331	Paved

Hellenikon Air Base is a decommissioned United States Air Force base located in Athens, Greece. After its closure, it was redeveloped into Ellinikon International Airport.

== History ==
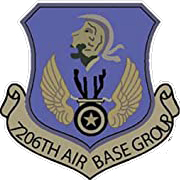
Emblem of 7206th Air Base Group.

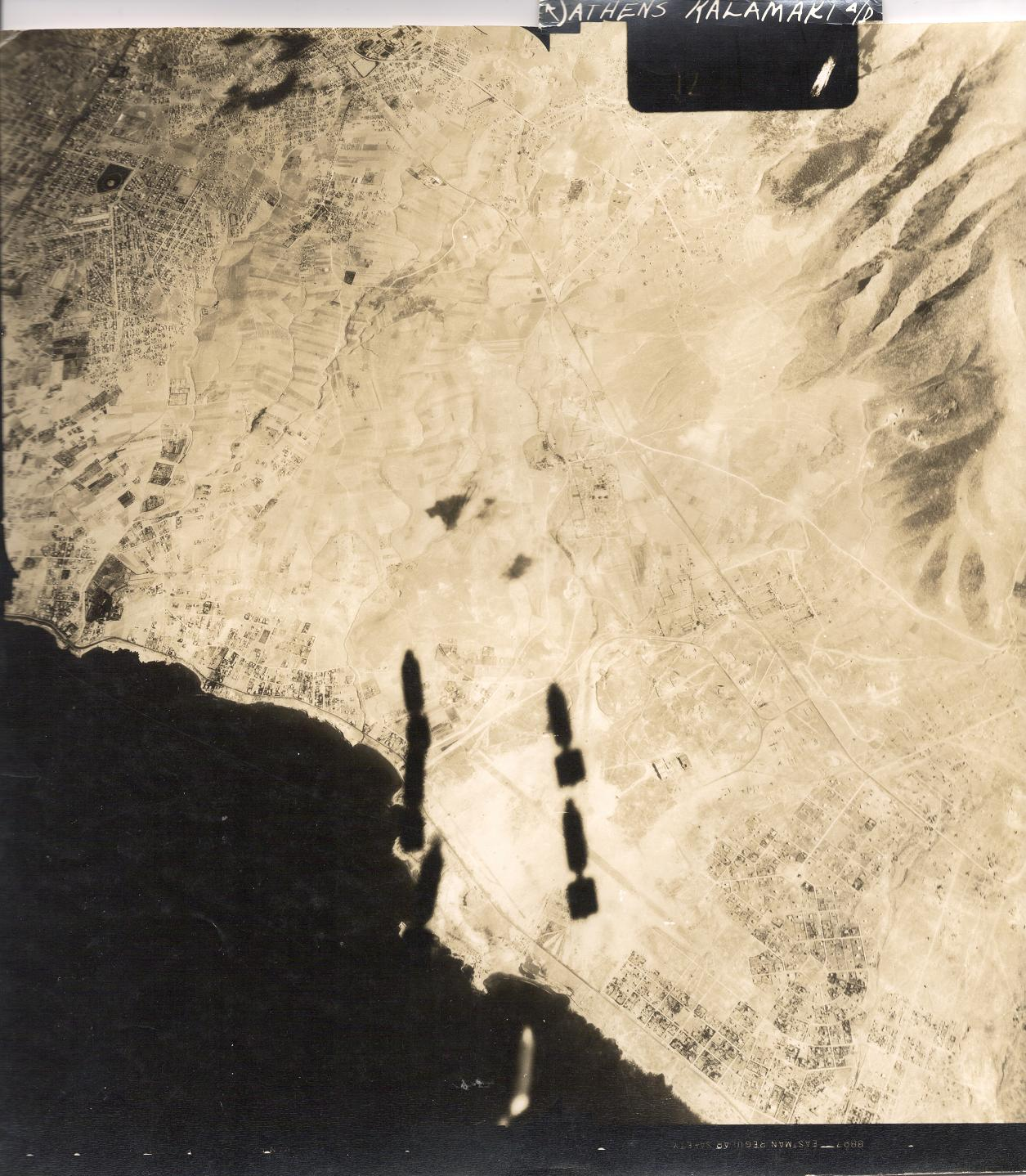
Kalamaki Airfield being bombed by the USAAF 463rd Bomb Group (B-17's) on 15 September 1944

The airport was built in 1938, and after the German invasion of Greece in 1941, Kalamaki Airfield was used as a Luftwaffe air base during the occupation. Following the end of World War II, the Greek government allowed the United States to use the airport from 1945 until 1993. Known as Hassani Airport in 1945, it was used by the United States Army Air Forces as early as 1 October 1945, as a base of operations for Air Transport Command flights between Rome, Italy and points in the Middle East.

A semi-permanent USAAF presence was established in May 1947 as the facility was being reconstructed to facilitate Marshall Plan aid to Greece and Turkey. On 5 October 1948, the United States Air Force assigned the Military Air Transport Service 1632d Air Base Squadron to the airport with ten C-47 Skytrain cargo aircraft being based at the airport.

A new control tower opened in 1951, and by 1954 with the end of Marshall Plan, the United States Air Forces in Europe 7206th Air Base Squadron (later Group) was assigned to the airport. Commercial airline service returned to the facility in 1956 with the airport being turned over to Greek civil aviation authorities. The airport was renamed Athenai International Airport, and the USAF used a small part of the airport for military cargo use, along with United States diplomatic air traffic.

The 7206th Air Base Group remained the primary USAF unit at the airport with the 6916th Security Squadron providing electronic aerial surveillance of the eastern Mediterranean and the Middle East). The USAF used the airport for airlift evacuation operations from Middle East (1967), Cyprus (1975), Ethiopia (1977), and Iran (1979, 1981). The American base was renamed Hellenikon Air Base on 25 February 1976, and also provided administrative and logistical support to U.S. units and organizations in Greece, the Middle East, Eastern Mediterranean, and parts of Africa. With the end of the Cold War, it was agreed to end the USAF presence at the airport and the United States closed its facilities in 1993.

In 1963, the Finnish star architect Eero Saarinen designed the East Terminal building. Prior to closing its passenger service, the airport was serving 12 million passengers per year.
