= List of United States Air Force aeromedical evacuation squadrons =

This article is a list of United States Air Force aeromedical evacuation squadrons both active, inactive, and historical. An aeromedical evacuation squadron's purpose is to evacuate wounded military personnel and civilians from areas of danger to medical facilities with the use of military transport aircraft.

== List ==
Squadron	Shield	Location	Nickname	Note
1st Aeromedical Evacuation Squadron		Rhein-Main Air Base, Germany 1951–58; Pope AFB, North Carolina 1975-94		Inactive - redesignated 23d AES (C-130), originally activated as 1st Medical Air Evacuation Squadron (C-47, C-54, C-131)
2d Aeromedical Evacuation Squadron		Rhein-Main Air Base, Germany 1975-94		Formerly a group; Inactive - replaced by 86th AES (C-9A)
3d Aeromedical Evacuation Squadron		RAF Burtonwood, England 1954–57; RAF Bovingdon, England 1957–62; RAF Mildenhall, England 1962-63		Inactive (C-47, C-131)
7th Aeromedical Evacuation Squadron		Wheelus Air Base, Libya 1955–57; Athens International Airport, Greece 1957-58		Inactive (C-47, C-54)
9th Aeromedical Evacuation Squadron		Clark Air Base, Philippines 1957–66, 1975–89; Yokota Air Base, Japan 1989-94		Inactive - replaced by 374th AES (C-9A, C-47, C-54, C-118, C-130, C-131, C-141); successor to 801st MAES/AES (1942–1953), which was redesignated 6481st MAEG (1953–1956), which then was redesignated 9th AES, (1956–1966), which gained Group status again (1966–1975), before being redesignated back to 9th AES.
10th Aeromedical Evacuation Squadron		Kelly AFB, Texas 1963–69; Travis AFB, California 1972-75		Inactive (C-131, C-141)
10th Expeditionary Aeromedical Evacuation Flight		Ramstein Air Base, Germany		C-17
18th Aeromedical Evacuation Squadron		Kadena Air Base, Japan		C-130, KC-135; 374th AES was redesignated 18th AES, 2003.
21st Aeromedical Evacuation Squadron		Pope AFB, NC 1957-70		Inactive (C-130)
22nd Aeromedical Evacuation Squadron		Donaldson AFB, South Carolina 1957; Sewart AFB, Tennessee 1957–68; Pope AFB, NC 1968-70		Inactive (C-130)
23rd Aeromedical Evacuation Squadron		Pope AFB, NC 1994-97		Inactive - redesignated 43d AES (C-130)
31st Aeromedical Evacuation Squadron		Mather AFB, CA 1961–67; McClellan AFB, CA 1967–70; Charleston AFB, SC 1971-1994		Inactive - redesignated 315th AES (C-124, C-141)
32d Aeromedical Evacuation Squadron		Salt Lake City International Airport, Utah 1962-66		Inactive (C-124)
33d Aeromedical Evacuation Squadron		Pittsburgh International Airport, PA 1961-94		Inactive, redesignated 911th AES (C-119, C-123, C-124, C-130)
34th Aeromedical Evacuation Squadron		Brooks AFB, TX 1959–60; Kelly AFB, TX 1960–68, 69–94; Yokota AB, Japan 1968–69; Peterson Air Force Base, Colorado 2008-		C-119, C-124, C-141, C-130; 302d Airlift Wing (C-130)
35th Aeromedical Evacuation Squadron		Birmingham, Alabama 1961–72; Maxwell AFB, AL 1972-94		Inactive, redesignated 908th AES (C-119, C-123, C-124, C-7, C-130)
36th Aeromedical Evacuation Squadron		Richards-Gebaur AFB, Missouri, 1964–93; Pope AFB, NC 2008–17; Keesler AFB, MS 2017-		C-130 C-124, C-130; 403d Wing (C/WC-130)
37th Aeromedical Evacuation Squadron		Miami International Airport, Florida 1959–71; Homestead AFB, FL 1971-74		Inactive (C-119, C-124)
40th Aeromedical Evacuation Squadron		Portland International Airport, Oregon 1958–71; McChord AFB, Washington 1971-94		Inactive, redesignated 446th AES (C-119, C-141)
43rd Aeromedical Evacuation Squadron		Pope Field, NC 1997-2020		Inactive, moved to Travis AFB and redesignated 60th AES (C-130)
45th Aeromedical Evacuation Squadron		Richards-Gebaur AFB, Missouri 1959–71; Selfridge AFB, Michigan 1971–93; MacDill AFB, Florida 2008-		C-119, C-124, C-130; 927th Air Refueling Wing (KC-135)
46th Aeromedical Evacuation Squadron		Chanute AFB, Illinois 1959-67		Inactive (C-124)
47th Aeromedical Evacuation Squadron		Minneapolis-St Paul International Airport, Minnesota 1959-94		Inactive, redesignated 934th AES (C-119, C-130)
55th Aeromedical Evacuation Squadron		Elmendorf AFB, Alaska 1970-71		Inactive (C-141).
56th Aeromedical Evacuation Squadron		Tachikawa Air Base, Japan 1963–68; Yokota Air Base, Japan 1968-72		Inactive (C-130, C-141)
57th Aeromedical Evacuation Squadron		Clark AB, Philippines 1965–72; Scott Air Force Base, Illinois 1973-94		Inactive - replaced by 375th AES (C-130, C-141, C-9A)
58th Aeromedical Evacuation Squadron		Rhein-Main Air Base, Germany 1968–72; McGuire AFB, New Jersey 1972-75		Inactive (C-130, C-131, C-141)
60th Aeromedical Evacuation Squadron	60th Aeromedical Evacuation Sq emblem	Andrews AFB, Maryland 1967–94; Travis AFB, California 2020-		(C-124, C-130, C-141) Andrews, (C-17) Travis
61st Aeromedical Evacuation Flight		Barksdale AFB, Louisiana 1967-73		Inactive (C-124)
63rd Aeromedical Evacuation Squadron		Chanute AFB, Illinois 1967–72; O'Hare International Airport, IL 1972-94		Inactive (C-124, C-130)
64th Aeromedical Evacuation Squadron		Dobbins AFB, Georgia 1971-94		Inactive, redesignated 94th AES (C-124, C-7, C-130)
65th Aeromedical Evacuation Squadron		Hamilton AFB, California 1967–70; Travis AFB, CA 1970-94		Inactive, redesignated 349th AES (C-124, C-141)
67th Aeromedical Evacuation Squadron		Hanscom AFB, Massachusetts 1967–73; Rickenbacker ANGB, Ohio 1973–93; Wright-Patterson Air Force Base, Ohio 1993-94		Inactive - redesignated 445th AES (C-124, C-123, C-130, C-141)
68th Aeromedical Evacuation Squadron		Norton AFB, CA 1967–93; March AFB, CA 1993-94		Inactive, redesignated 452d AES (C-141)
69th Aeromedical Evacuation Squadron		McChord AFB, WA ?-1971; McGuire AFB, NJ 1971-1994		Inactive, redesignated 514th AES (C-141)
70th Aeromedical Evacuation Squadron		Naval Air Station New Orleans 1967–71; Niagara Falls International Airport, New York 1978-94		Inactive, redesignated 914th AES (C-124, C-130)
72d Aeromedical Evacuation Squadron		Stewart AFB, New York 1967–69; Dover Air Force Base, Delaware 1969–73; McGuire AFB, NJ 1973-1994		Inactive, redesignated 714th AES (C-124, C-141)
73d Aeromedical Evacuation Squadron		Tinker Air Force Base, OK 1970–72; Scott AFB, IL 1972-94		Inactive - redesignated 932d AES (C-124, C-9A)
74th Aeromedical Evacuation Squadron		Westover Air Reserve Base, MA 1974-94		Inactive, redesignated 439th AES (C-124, C-123, C-130)
86th Aeromedical Evacuation Squadron		Ramstein Air Base, Germany		C-17, C-130
94th Aeromedical Evacuation Squadron	94th Aeromedical Evacuation Squadron Unit Shield	Dobbins AFB, Georgia		C-130
102d Aeromedical Evacuation Flight		Floyd Bennett Field, New York 1963-67		inactive (MC-119, C-97)
103d Aeromedical Evacuation Flight		Philadelphia International Airport, PA 1961–63, Naval Air Station Willow Grove, PA 1963-73		Inactive (C-97, C-121)
106th Aeromedical Evacuation Squadron		Floyd Bennett Field, New York 1963-67		Inactive (MC-119, C-97)
109th Aeromedical Evacuation Squadron		Minneapolis, MN		C-130
116th Aeromedical Evacuation Squadron		Dobbins AFB, GA 1961-67		Inactive (C-97)
118th Aeromedical Evacuation Squadron		Nashville, TN 1962-2014		Inactive (C-17, C-130, C-124)
125th Aeromedical Evacuation Flight		Tulsa, OK 1961-73		Inactive (C-97)
133d Aeromedical Evacuation Squadron		Minneapolis-St Paul International Airport, MN 1961-1967		Inactive (C-97)
133d Aeromedical Evacuation Flight		Grenier Air Force Base, NH 1961–66; Pease AFB, NH 1966-73		Inactive (C-97, C-124)
137th Aeromedical Evacuation Squadron		Oklahoma City, Oklahoma 1961–73, 1986- Will Rogers Air National Guard Base, OK		C-97, C-124, C-130, KC-135; No Assigned Aircraft
139th Aeromedical Evacuation Squadron		Schenectady, NY		109th Airlift Wing (C/LC-130)
142d Aeromedical Evacuation Squadron		New Castle, Delaware		166th Airlift Wing (C-130)
146th Aeromedical Evacuation Squadron		Naval Air Station Point Mugu, CA		C-130
147th Aeromedical Evacuation Flight		Pittsburgh International Airport, PA 1964-72		Inactive (C-121)
150th Aeromedical Evacuation Flight		Newark International Airport, NJ 1964–65; McGuire AFB, NJ 1965-69		Inactive (C-121)
156th Aeromedical Evacuation Squadron		Charlotte, North Carolina		145th Airlift Wing (C-17)
167th Aeromedical Evacuation Squadron		Charleston, West Virginia		130th Airlift Wing (C-130)
183d Aeromedical Evacuation Squadron		Jackson, Mississippi		172d Airlift Wing (C-17)
187th Aeromedical Evacuation Squadron		Cheyenne, Wyoming		153d Airlift Wing (C-130)
315th Aeromedical Evacuation Squadron		Charleston AFB, SC		C-17
349th Aeromedical Evacuation Squadron		Travis AFB, CA		C-17
374th Aeromedical Evacuation Squadron		Yokota AB, Japan 1994-2003		Inactive, redesignated 18th AES (C-9A)
375th Aeromedical Evacuation Squadron		Scott AFB, IL		C-130
379th Expeditionary Aeromedical Evacuation Squadron		Al Udeid Air Base, Qatar		C-17, C-130
386th Expeditionary Aeromedical Evacuation Squadron		Ali Al Salem AB, Kuwait		Inactive (C-130)
433d Aeromedical Evacuation Squadron		Lackland AFB, Texas		C-130
405th Expeditionary Aeromedical Evacuation Squadron		Bagram Air Base, Afghanistan		C-17, C-130
439th Aeromedical Evacuation Squadron		Westover Air Reserve Base, MA		C-130
445th Aeromedical Evacuation Squadron		Wright-Patterson AFB, Ohio		C-17
446th Aeromedical Evacuation Squadron		McChord AFB, WA		C-17
452nd Aeromedical Evacuation Squadron		March Air Reserve Base, California		C-17
459th Aeromedical Evacuation Squadron		Andrews AFB, MD		KC-135
514th Aeromedical Evacuation Squadron		McGuire AFB, NJ		C-17
610th Aeromedical Evacuation Squadron		MacDill AFB, FL 1994-97		Inactive
622d Aeromedical Evacuation Squadron		MacDill AFB, FL 1997-2008		Inactive, redesignated 45th AES
651st Expeditionary Aeromedical Evacuation Squadron		Kandahar, Afghanistan 2011–13 Camp Bastion, Afghanistan (Detachment 1) 2011–13		Inactive (C-17, C-130, HC-130N/P)
714th Aeromedical Evacuation Squadron		McGuire AFB, New Jersey 1994-2008		Inactive, merged with 514 AES (C-141, C-130)
775th Expeditionary Aeromedical Evacuation Flight		Andrews/Lackland/Travis, 2004-		C-17, C-130, KC-135
801st Medical Air Evacuation Squadron		Tachikawa Air Base, Japan 1947–50, 1951–56; Ashiya Air Base, Japan 1950-51		Inactive (C-47, C-54); WWII service 13th AF, 5th AF, & MAG-25, Pacific, 1942–1947; redesignated 6481st MAEG, 18 Jun 1953; 6481st Group redesignated 9th AES, 1956.
830th Medical Air Evacuation Squadron		Andrews AFB, MD 1947-49		Inactive (C-47)
901st Aeromedical Evacuation Squadron		Tachikawa AB, Japan 1966-1970		Inactive (C-118, C-130)
902d Aeromedical Evacuation Squadron		Clark AB, PI 1966-1972		Inactive (C-47, C-54, C-118, C-130, C-141)
903d Aeromedical Evacuation Squadron		Tan Son Nhut Air Base, South Vietnam 1966–71, 1972; Cam Ranh Bay AB, RVN 1966-1972		Inactive (C-7, C-118, C-123, C-130)
908th Aeromedical Evacuation Squadron		Maxwell AFB, Alabama		C-130
911th Aeromedical Evacuation Squadron		Pittsburgh, Pennsylvania		C-130/C-17
914th Aeromedical Evacuation Squadron		Niagara Falls, New York		KC-135
932nd Aeromedical Evacuation Squadron		Scott AFB, Illinois		C-130
934th Aeromedical Evacuation Squadron		Minneapolis-Saint Paul IAP		C-130

== See also ==
- List of United States Air Force squadrons
