= List of United States Air Force Groups =

This is a list of Groups in the United States Air Force that do not belong to a host wing.

The last level of independent operation is the group level. When an organization is not part of the primary mission of the base it will be made an independent group. They may report to a wing or they may be completely independent (the 317th Airlift Group at Dyess Air Force Base). They may also be organized as an expeditionary unit, independent but too small to warrant a wing designation. The organization of the independent group is usually similar to the operations group, but with a few squadrons or flight from the support side added to make the organization more self-sufficient, but not large enough to become a wing.

== Current Groups ==
Group	Shield	Location	MAJCOM/DRU	Weapons System
1st Air Support Operations Group		Joint Base Lewis-McChord, Washington	PACAF	
1st Weather Group (WXG)		Offutt AFB, Nebraska	AFWA	
2nd Weather Group		Offutt AFB, Nebraska	AFWA	
3rd Air Support Operations Group		Fort Cavazos, Texas	ACC	
3rd Combat Communications Group (CCG)		Tinker AFB, Oklahoma	AFSPC	
4th Air Support Operations Group		Campbell Barracks, Germany	USAFE	
5th Combat Communications Group		Robins AFB, Georgia	AFSPC	
18th Air Support Operations Group		Pope Field, North Carolina	ACC	
23rd Fighter Group		Moody AFB, Georgia	ACC	A-10
26th Network Operations Group		Joint Base San Antonio, Texas	AFSPC	
38th Cyberspace Engineering Group		Tinker AFB, Oklahoma	AFSPC	
43rd Air Mobility Operations Group		Pope Field, North Carolina	AMC	
44th Fighter Group		Holloman AFB, New Mexico	AFRC	F-22
53rd Electronic Warfare Group		Eglin AFB, Florida	ACC	
53rd Test and Evaluation Group		Nellis AFB, Nevada	ACC	
53rd Test Management Group		Eglin AFB, Florida	ACC	
53rd Weapons Evaluation Group		Tyndall AFB, Florida	ACC	QF-4
54th Fighter Group		Holloman AFB, New Mexico	AETC	F-16
55th Electronic Combat Group		Davis–Monthan AFB, Arizona	ACC	EC-130
61st Air Base Group		Los Angeles AFB, California	AFSPC	
64th Air Expeditionary Group		Eskan Village, Saudi Arabia	USAFCENT	
65th Air Base Group		Lajes Field, Azores	USAFE	
66th Air Base Group		Hanscom AFB, Massachusetts	AFMC	
69th Reconnaissance Group		Grand Forks AFB, North Dakota	ACC	
162nd Combat Communications Group		North Highlands ANGS, California	AFSPC/ANG	
170th Group		Offutt AFB, Nebraska	ACC/ANG	
214th Reconnaissance Group		Davis–Monthan AFB, Arizona	ACC/ANG	
226th Combat Communications Group		Abston ANGS, Alabama	AFSPC/ANG	
251st Cyberspace Engineering Installation Group		Springfield ANGB, Ohio	AFSPC/ANG	
253rd Cyberspace Engineering Installation Group		Otis ANGB, Massachusetts	AFSPC/ANG	
254th Combat Communications Group		Hensley Field, Texas	AFSPC/ANG	
306th Flying Training Group		USAF Academy, Colorado	AETC	
308th Armament Systems Group		Inactive	AFMC	
317th Airlift Group		Dyess AFB, Texas	AMC	C-130
318th Information Operations Group		Joint Base San Antonio, Texas	AFSPC	
328th Armament Systems Group		Inactive	AFMC	
336th Training Group		Fairchild AFB, Washington	AETC	UH-1
340th Flying Training Group		Joint Base San Antonio, Texas	AFRC	T-1A T-6 T-37 T-38
347th Rescue Group		Moody AFB, Georgia	ACC	HC-130 HH-60
353rd Special Operations Group		Kadena AB, Japan	AFSOC	MC-130 MH-53
360th Recruiting Group		Defense Distribution Center Susquehanna	AETC	
363rd Training Group		Al Dhafra AB, United Arab Emirates	USAFCENT	
367th Recruiting Group		Robins AFB, Georgia	AETC	
369th Recruiting Group		Lackland AFB, Texas	AETC	
372nd Recruiting Group		Hill AFB, Utah	AETC	
381st Training Group		Vandenberg AFB, California	AETC	Minuteman III
387th Air Expeditionary Group		Kuwait City IAP, Kuwait	USAFCENT	
404th Air Expeditionary Group		Ramstein AB, Germany	USAFE	C-130
407th Air Expeditionary Group		Iraq	USAFCENT	
408th Armament Systems Group		Inactive	AFMC	
409th Air Expeditionary Group		Ramstein AB, Germany	USAFE	C-130
413th Flight Test Group		Robins AFB, Georgia	AFRC	
414th Fighter Group		Seymour Johnson AFB, North Carolina	AFRC	
420th Air Base Group		RAF Fairford, Gloucestershire, England	USAFE	
422nd Air Base Group		RAF Croughton, Northamptonshire, England	USAFE	
423rd Air Base Group		RAF Alconbury, Cambridgeshire, England	USAFE	
438th Air Expeditionary Advisory Group		Shindand Air Base, Afghanistan	USAFCENT	
447th Air Expeditionary Group		Baghdad International Airport, Iraq	USAFCENT	
449th Air Expeditionary Group		Camp Lemonier, Djibouti	USAFE	
463rd Airlift Group		Inactive	AMC	
466th Air Expeditionary Group		Afghanistan	AFCENT	
476th Fighter Group		Moody AFB, Georgia	AFRC	A-10
477th Fighter Group		Joint Base Elmendorf–Richardson, Alaska	AFRC	F-22
495th Fighter Group		Shaw Air Force Base, South Carolina	AFRC	F-16 A-10
504th Expeditionary Air Support Operations Group		Bagram AB, Afghanistan	USAFCENT	
506th Air Expeditionary Group		Inactive	USAFCENT	
513th Air Control Group		Tinker AFB, Oklahoma	AFRC	E-3
526th ICBM Systems Group		Inactive	AFMC	
563rd Rescue Group		Davis–Monthan AFB, Arizona	ACC	HH-60/HC-130
582nd Helicopter Group		F.E. Warren AFB, Wyoming	AFGSC	UH-1
595th Command and Control Group		Offutt AFB, Nebraska	AFGSC	
605th Air Operations Group		Inactive	PACAF	
607th Air Support Operations Group		Osan AB, South Korea	PACAF	
611th Air Support Group		Joint Base Elmendorf–Richardson, Alaska	PACAF	
615th Air Mobility Operations Group		Travis AFB, California	AMC	
621st Air Mobility Operations Group		Joint Base McGuire-Dix-Lakehurst, New Jersey	AMC	
688th Cyberspace Operations Group		Scott AFB, Illinois	AFSPC	
690th Network Support Group		Joint Base San Antonio, Texas	AFSPC	
708th Armament Systems Group		Inactive	AFMC	
715th Air Mobility Operations Group		Joint Base Pearl Harbor–Hickam, Hawaii	AMC	
720th Special Tactics Group		Hurlburt Field, Florida	AFSOC	
721st Air Mobility Operations Group		Ramstein AB, Germany	AMC	
728th Armament Systems Group		Inactive	AFMC	
738th Air Expeditionary Advisory Group		Kandahar Airfield, Afghanistan	USAFCENT	
752nd Special Operations Group		RAF Mildenhall, UK	AFSOC	MC-130 MH-53
808th Armament Systems Group		Inactive	AFMC	
820th Base Defense Group		Moody AFB, Georgia	ACC	
821st Air Base Group		Thule AB, Greenland	AFSPC	
838th Air Expeditionary Advisory Group		Shindand AB, Afghanistan	USAFCENT	
844th Communications Group		Joint Base Anacostia-Bolling, DC	AFDW	
917th Fighter Group		Barksdale AFB, Louisiana	AFRC	
924th Fighter Group		Davis–Monthan AFB, Arizona	AFRC	
926th Group		Nellis AFB, Nevada	AFRC	
931st Air Refueling Group		McConnell AFB, Kansas	AFRC	KC-135
943rd Rescue Group		Davis–Monthan AFB, Arizona	AFRC	HH-60
960th Cyberspace Operations Group		Lackland AFB, Texas	AFRC/AFSPC	

== Inactive Groups ==
The 1st, 2nd, and 9th Aeromedical Evacuation Groups all previously existed.

The 1045th Observation, Evaluation and Training Group was active at Bolling Air Force Base DC, 21 October 1963-30 June 1975, and at Eglin AFB, FL. Detachment 2, 1045th OETG was established at Kadena AB, Okinawa in 1955. Det. 2's mission was to conduct high-altitude, high-risk, clandestine logistics support flights to Tibet. It used a single C-118 Liftmaster marked as Civil Air Transport, a CIA front organisation.

The 427th Special Operations Training Squadron (tail code IJ) at England Air Force Base, Louisiana, flew the Cessna A-37 Dragonfly (OA-37B FAC variant) from 1970–1972, assigned to the provisional 4410th Special Operations Training Group, Tactical Air Command.

During and immediately after the Korean War, Tactical Air Command (TAC) trained aircrews for the Douglas B-26 Invader at Langley Air Force Base, Virginia. The three squadrons of the 4400th Combat Crew Training Group performing this mission were Air National Guard units that had been mobilized for the war. At the start of 1953, these squadrons were returned to state control and the 423d Bombardment Squadron was activated and took over the mission, personnel, and equipment of the 117th Bombardment Squadron, which returned to the Pennsylvania Air National Guard. In January 1954, the group mission shifted to tactical bombardment and it was redesignated the 4400th Bombardment Group. The group expected to transition to Martin B-57 Canberra aircraft. As this was to take place, TAC decided to replace the Table of Distribution 4400th Group and its squadrons with the regular 345th Bombardment Group, which took over their mission in July 1954 and the 423d BS was inactivated.

In 1988, Tactical Air Command activated the 4443rd Test and Evaluation Group as an operational test unit at Eglin Air Force Base, an Air Force Systems Command (AFSC) base. The 4443rd Tactics and Training Group (Air Warrior), aligned under the 35th Tactical Training Wing, was active at George Air Force Base, Ca., in 1989. It was inactivated in 1991.

The 4450th Standardization Evaluation Group (SEG) was activated in the early 1960s.

Colonel Abner M. Aust served as Deputy Commander and then Commander of the 6002nd Standardization Evaluation Group at Kadena Air Base, Okinawa, from September 1963 to June 1965. The group was inactivated on 20 November 1967.

It appears that the 6903rd, 6912th, 6917th, and 6920th Electronic Security Groups all previously existed. The 6922d Security Group was activated in April 1970 at Clark Air Base in the Philippines. Initially, the group intercepted and listened to foreign electronic communications through subordinate detachments ranging from Thailand through Japan. With the withdrawal of the United States from Vietnam, operations were substantially reduced, and by 1974 were limited to direction finding, and the group was reduced to the 6922d Security Squadron.

After the departure of its last flying squadron, the 25th Tactical Reconnaissance Wing continued to wind down operations at Chambley Air Base, France, until 15 October 1966, when it inactivated, although it was no longer operational. Its remaining support personnel were transferred to the 7367th Tactical Group, which managed US Air Force operations at Chambley until they terminated in April 1967.

The 7382nd Guided Missile Group (Tactical) was stationed at Hahn Air Base, West Germany, in the 1960s, before being replaced by the 701st Tactical Missile Wing.

Group	Shield	Location	MAJCOM / DRU	Years active
311th Air Base Group		Brooks City-Base	AFMC	???? – 2011
368th Expeditionary Air Support Operations Group		Iraq	AFCENT	Inactivated 18 Dec 2011
370th Air Expeditionary Advisory Group		New Al Muthana AB, Iraq	USAFCENT	200? – 2011
467th Air Expeditionary Group		Iraq	USAFCENT	Inactivated 18 Dec 2011
586th Air Expeditionary Group		Iraq	USAFCENT	2005–2010
732nd Air Expeditionary Group		Iraq	USAFCENT	Replaced by 467 AEG
755th Air Expeditionary Group		Afghanistan	USAFCENT	Replaced by 466 AEG
800th Air Base Group		Whiteman AFB, MO	SAC	Redesignated 1960 as 800th Combat Support Group
801st Air Base Group		Lockbourne AFB, OH	SAC	Redesignated 1960 as 801st Combat Support Group
802nd Air Base Group		Schilling AFB, KS	SAC	Redesignated 1960 as 802nd Combat Support Group
803rd Air Base Group		Davis–Monthan AFB, AZ	SAC	Redesignated 1960 as 803rd Combat Support Group
804th Air Base Group		Hunter AFB, GA	SAC	Redesignated 1960 as 804th Combat Support Group
805th Air Base Group		Barksdale AFB, LA	SAC	Redesignated 1960 as 805th Combat Support Group
806th Air Base Group		Lake Charles AFB, LA	SAC	Redesignated 1960 as 806th Combat Support Group
807th Air Base Group		March AFB, CA	SAC	Redesignated 1960 as 807th Combat Support Group
808th Air Base Group		March AFB, CA	SAC	Redesignated 1960 as 808th Combat Support Group
809th Air Base Group		Francis E. Warren Air Force Base, WY	SAC	
810th Air Base Group		Biggs AFB, TX	SAC	Redesignated 1960 as 810th Combat Support Group
811th Air Base Group		Bergstrom AFB, TX	SAC	Redesignated 1960 as 811th Combat Support Group
812th Air Base Group		Walker AFB, NM	SAC	Redesignated 1960 as 812th Combat Support Group
813th Air Base Group		Pinecastle AFB, FL	SAC	
814th Air Base Group		Fairchild AFB, WA	SAC	Relocated: 1955
814th Air Base Group		Westover AFB, MA	SAC	Redesignated 1960
815th Air Base Group		Forbes AFB, KS	SAC	Redesignated 1960 as 815th Combat Support Group
816th Air Base Group		Altus AFB, OK	SAC	Redesignated 1960 as 816th Combat Support Group
817th Air Base Group		Pease AFB, NH	SAC	Redesignated 1960 as 817th Combat Support Group
818th Air Base Group		Lincoln AFB, NE	SAC	Redesignated 1960 as 818th Combat Support Group
819th Air Base Group		Dyess AFB, TX	SAC	Redesignated 1960 as 819th Combat Support Group
820th Air Base Group		Plattsburgh AFB, NY	SAC	Redesignated 1960 as 820th Combat Support Group
821st Air Base Group		Ellsworth AFB, SD	SAC	Redesignated 1960 as 821st Combat Support Group
822nd Air Base Group		Turner AFB, GA	SAC	Redesignated 1960 as 822nd Combat Support Group
823rd Air Base Group		Homestead AFB, FL	SAC	Redesignated 1960 as 823rd Combat Support Group
824th Air Base Group		Carswell AFB, TX	SAC	Redesignated 1960 as 824th Combat Support Group
825th Air Base Group		Little Rock AFB, AR	SAC	Redesignated 1960 as 825th Combat Support Group
862nd Air Base Group		Minot AFB, ND	SAC	Redesignated 1960 as 862nd Combat Support Group
866th Combat Support Group		McConnell AFB, KS	SAC	
1000th Satellite Operations Group		Offutt AFB, NB	Air Force Space Command	1 May 1983 - 31 July 1992, 1st Space Wing
1503rd Air Transport Group				
1600th Air Transport Group				
1607th Air Transport Group				
1700th Air Transport Group				
1701st Air Transport Group				
1703rd Air Transport Group				
1705th Air Transport Group				
1706th Air Transport Group (Aeromedical Evacuation)				Discontinued 1956 - see 13th Aeromedical Airlift Squadron
918th Armament Systems Group		Eglin AFB, FL	AFMC	
1001st Air Base Group		Andrews AFB	MATS	Base operating group for Andrews Air Force Base from 1 July 1968 to 1 July 1969.
1450th Medical Air Evacuation Group		Andrews AFB	MATS?	4 January 1969 - 6 September 1969.
1931st Communications Group				
2049th Communications Group		McClellan AFB, CA	AFCC	
2714th Ammunition Supply Group (Depot)		Tachikawa Air Base, Japan		1 October 1955 - 1 June 1956
3200th Proof Test Group				
3205th Drone Group				
3700th Technical Training Group		Sheppard AFB, TX	Air Training Command	From 1 February 1992, succeeded 3700th TTW
3906rd Air Base Group		Sidi Slimane Air Base, French Morocco	SAC	Redesignated 1960 as 3906th Combat Support Group
3909rd Air Base Group		RAF Greenham Common, UK	SAC	Redesignated 1960 as 3909th Combat Support Group
3910th Air Base Group		RAF Lakenheath / RAF Mildenhall, UK	SAC	Redesignated 1960 as 3910th Combat Support Group
3911th Air Base Group		RAF West Drayton, UK	SAC	Redesignated 1960 as 3911th Combat Support Group
3914th Air Base Group		RAF Chelveston, UK	SAC	Redesignated 1960 as 3914th Combat Support Group
3917th Air Base Group		RAF Manston, UK	SAC	Redesignated 1960 as 3917th Combat Support Group
3918th Air Base Group		RAF Upper Heyford, UK	SAC	Redesignated 1960 as 3918th Combat Support Group and in 1964 as the 3918th Strategic Wing
3919th Air Base Group		RAF Fairford, UK	SAC	Redesignated 1960 as 3919th Combat Support Group
3920th Air Base Group		RAF Brize Norton, UK	SAC	Redesignated 1960 as 3920th Combat Support Group and in 1964 as the 3920th Strategic Wing
3922nd Combat Support Group		Nouasseur Air Base, French Morocco	SAC	
3926th Combat Support Group		Ben Guerir Air Base, French Morocco	SAC	
3928th Air Base Group		RAF Sturgate, UK	SAC	1954-57; redesignated 1960 as 3928th Combat Support Group
3936th Combat Support Group		Boulhaut Air Base, French Morocco	SAC	
3960th Air Base Group		Andersen AFB, Guam	SAC	Redesignated 1960 as 3960th Combat Support Group and in 1964 as the 3960th Strategic Wing
3970th Combat Support Group		Torrejon AB, Spain	SAC	Redesignated in 1964 as the 3970th Strategic Wing
3973rd Air Base Group		Moron AB, Spain	SAC	Redesignated 1960 as 3973rd Combat Support Group and in 1964 as the 3973rd Strategic Wing
3974th Combat Support Group		Zaragoza AB, Spain	SAC	
4000th Support Group		Offutt AFB, NB	SAC	4000th SG organized on 1 February 1963; redesignated 4000th Aerospace Application Group on 1 January 1973; redesignated 4000th Satellite Operations Group on 3 April 1981
4037th Air Base Group		Altus AFB, OK	TAC	Base operating group for Altus Air Force Base 15 Oct - 18 Nov. 1953.
4082nd Air Base Group		CFB Goose Bay, Canada	SAC	Redesignated 1960 as 4082nd Combat Support Group and in 1964 as the 4082nd Strategic Wing
4083rd Air Base Group		Thule AB, Greenland	SAC	Redesignated 1960 as 4083rd Air Base Wing and later as the 4083rd Strategic Wing
4084th Air Base Group		Sondrestrom Air Base, Greenland	SAC	
4157th Combat Support Group		Eielson AFB, AK	SAC	Redesignated 1964 as the 4157th Strategic Wing
4158th Air Base Group		Elmendorf Field, AK	SAC	Redesignated 1960 as 4158th Combat Support Group and in 1964 as the 4158th Strategic Wing
4402nd Tactical Training Group		Shaw AFB, SC	TAC	Aircraft
4450th Tactical Group		Tonopah Test Range Airport / Nellis AFB, NV	TAC	
4460th Tactical Control Group		Waco, TX	TAC	Discontinued (disbanded) 1 March 1966.
6029th Support Group		Chitose Air Base, Japan		8–31 December 1957
6332nd Air Base Group		Kadena Air Base, Okinawa	FEAF	April 1949 – January 1950, then redesignated 6332nd Air Base Wing
6400th Air Base Group		Tachikawa Air Base, Japan	FEAF?	1 Feb 1952– ????; redesignation of pre-1 Feb 1952 13th Air Base Group
6400th Maintenance & Supply Group		Tachikawa Air Base, Japan	FEAF?	1 Feb 1952 - unknown
6401st Ammunition Supply Group (Depot)		Tachikawa Air Base, Japan	FEAF?	1 Dec 1954– ????; stationed at FEAMCOM AB, a sub-installation of Tachikawa AB
6481st Medical Air Evacuation Group		Tachikawa Air Base, Japan	FEAF?	18 June 1953– ????; the 6481st MAEG, a Table of Distribution unit, replaced the 801st MAES.
6594th Test Group		Hickam AFB, HI	AFSC	
6900th Communications-Computer Group		Lackland AFB, TX	Electronic Security Command	1 April 1991, redesignated Air Intelligence Agency Intelligence Systems Group on 1 October 1993.
6937th Communications Group		Peshawar Air Station, Pakistan		Group at the base from July 17, 1959 until being evacuated on 7 January 1970.
7020th Air Base Group		Ramstein AB, Germany	USAFE	
7030th Air Base Group		Ramstein AB, Germany	USAFE	
7375th Combat Support Group		RAF Sculthorpe, UK		
7382nd Guided Missile Group		Hahn Air Base, West Germany	USAFE	Later 7382nd Tactical Missile Group; supervised 69th Tactical Missile Squadron, 15 April 1956 – 15 September 1956
7416th Aeromedical Evacuation Group		Évreux-Fauville Air Base, France	USAFE	7416 AEG and its assigned units were reorganized on 8 April 1957 as the 2nd AEG, comprised the 1st, 3rd, and 7th Aeromedical Evacuation Squadrons and the 18th Casualty Staging Flight.
7499th Support Group		Wiesbaden, Germany	USAFE	
7560th Air Base Group		RAF Alconbury, UK	USAFE	
7575th Operations Group		Wiesbaden AB / Rhein-Main AB, Germany	USAFE	
Group	Shield	Location	MAJCOM / DRU	Years active

== Sources ==
USAF Historical Research Agency list of current Groups and Wings.
