= 420 =

420 may refer to:

== Science and technology ==
- 420 (number), in mathematics
- 420 Bertholda, a main-belt asteroid
- 4:2:0, a chroma subsampling layout
- NGC 420, a lenticular galaxy

== Cannabis culture ==
- 420 (cannabis culture), informal reference to cannabis use and celebrations on April 20
  - California Senate Bill 420 or the Medical Marijuana Program Act
  - "420" (Family Guy), an episode of Family Guy
  - "4-2-0" (song), a song by Kottonmouth Kings from Rollin' Stoned

== Dates ==
- AD 420, a year in the 5th century of the Julian calendar
- 420 BC, a year
- April 20

== Culture of India ==
- Section 420 of the Indian Penal Code, a law against cheating and dishonesty
  - Shree 420, a 1955 Indian Hindi-language comedy-drama film, starring Raj Kapoor
  - Chachi 420, a 1997 Indian Hindi-language comedy-drama film, starring Kamal Haasan
  - Uyarthiru 420, a 2011 Indian Tamil-language film
  - Mr. 420 (2012 film), an Indian Kannada-language romantic comedy film
  - 420 IPC (film), a 2021 Indian Hindi-language crime thriller film

== Other uses ==
- 4-2-0, a classification of steam locomotives
- 420 (dinghy), a class of double-handed racing sailboats
- "4:20", a song by Six Feet Under on the 1997 album Warpath
- +420, calling code of the Czech Republic
- Maserati 420, a saloon

== See also ==
- 420th (disambiguation)
- List of highways numbered 420
