= 420th =

420th may refer to:

- 420th Air Base Group or RAF Fairford (IATA: FFD, ICAO: EGVA), Royal Air Force (RAF) station in Gloucestershire, England
- 420th Air Refueling Squadron, inactive United States Air Force unit
- 420th Bombardment Squadron, inactive United States Air Force unit
- 420th Engineer Brigade (United States), combat engineer brigade of the United States Army based in Bryan, Texas
- 420th Flight Test Flight, United States Air Force Reserve squadron based at Phoenix-Mesa Gateway Airport Arizona

== See also ==
- 420 (number)
- 420 (disambiguation)
- AD 420, the year 420 (CDXX) of the Julian calendar
- 420 BC
