= Murder of Andreen McDonald =

Murder case of Andreen McDonald

- English name: Andreen McDonald
- Date: February 28, 2019
- Location: San Antonio, Texas, U.S.
- Cause: Homicidal violence (blunt force trauma and sharp force injuries)
- Motive: Jealousy motivated attack
- Arrests: Andre McDonald
- Trial: 2019
- Verdict: Guilty
- Convictions: Andre Sean McDonald: First-degree Manslaughter, kidnapping
- Sentence: 20 years’ imprisonment; additional five years for Tampering with evidence (consecutive)

Andreen Nicole McDonald (September 23, 1989 – February 28, 2019) was a 29-year-old businesswoman and philanthropist from Port Antonio, Jamaica, who lived in San Antonio, Texas. She owned an assisted living facility and was involved in her local community. In the months leading up to her disappearance, her marriage to Andre McDonald, a cyberwarfare operations officer in the U.S. Air Force Reserve major, was reported to have experienced difficulties.

In February 2019, Andreen was killed at her home and was later reported missing after she failed to appear for work. Her friends and family became concerned after being unable to contact her.

Following Andreen’s disappearance in 2019, law enforcement authorities identified Andre McDonald as a suspect in the case. On July 11, 2019, he was arrested and charged with first-degree murder. The charge followed the discovery of human skeleton remains in a field by a farmer, which were later identified as those of Andreen McDonald. In 2022, he was convicted of murder and sentenced to 20 years’ imprisonment. He also pleaded guilty to a separate charge of evidence tampering and received an additional five-year sentence to be served consecutively.

The case attracted media attention due to the circumstances surrounding McDonald’s disappearance and the subsequent investigation.

== Background ==
Andreen Nicole Anderson was born on September 23, 1989, in Port Antonio, Jamaica, to Hyacinth Mureen Ferron and Paul Anderson, She was the second of two children in the family. She attended Norwich Primary School and Titchfield High School.

Andreen obtained an associate degree in Business Studies with a concentration in Marketing from Excelsior Community College. She later emigrated to the United States, where she earned a Bachelor of Business Administration degree in Finance from the University of Texas at San Antonio.

Andreen married Andre Sean McDonald in Broward County, Florida, in 2009. She relocated to San Antonio, where Andre McDonald served as a cyberwarfare operations officer in the U.S. Air Force Reserve major, joining the 426th Network Warfare Squadron in October 2014.

At the age of 22, she established Starlight Homes Assisted Living in San Antonio, Texas, operating the business as equal partners with her husband.

== Disappearance ==
On the morning of March 1, 2019, Andreen did not report to work. Her friend, Carol Ghanbar, received a call from one of Andreen’s employees stating that she was not answering her phone and had failed to appear at work. Ghanbar later contacted Andreen’s gym, where she usually began her day, and learned she had not been there either. When she was unable to reach Andreen, she went to the McDonald residence and entered the home, where she noticed some irregularities. In the master bathroom, Ghanbar discovered blood on a light switch. She contacted Andreen's mother, Maureen Smith (née Ferron), and she drove to the Andreen home, where Smith contacted police and reported her daughter missing.

Upon arriving at the home to conduct a welfare check, Bexar County Sheriff's deputy observed blood and hair on a bathroom light switch. In the backyard, investigators discovered a burn pile, containing a zipper later identified as belonging to Andreen's blouse. Her purse, identification, and keys remained in the house, though her phone was absent.

Investigators focused on her husband, Andre McDonald, during the early stages of the investigation. Authorities later revealed that he had visited Camp Bullis, a military training facility north of San Antonio, on a day when he was not scheduled to be there, after Andreen had already been reported missing.

Within weeks of her disappearance, Bexar County Sheriff Javier Salazar stated publicly that investigators believed Andreen was dead. Search efforts nevertheless continued, with volunteers organising weekend searches throughout Bexar County. Texas Search and Rescue also participated in the operation before deputies later suspended its involvement.

The Federal Bureau of Investigation(FBI) joined the Bexar County Sheriff’s Office in the investigation. FBI Special Agent Michelle Lee made public appeals for information from potential witnesses and said confidentiality would be maintained for those who came forward. The bureau’s Evidence Response Team also assisted in the investigation, while Crime Stoppers of San Antonio offered a reward of up to $5,000 for information leading to an arrest.

A break in the case came on July 11, 2019, when a farmer discovered a human skeleton in a field, with the remains scattered among cow bones. Though McDonald's injuries were consistent with blunt-force trauma, pathologists could not determine an official cause of death due to the degraded state of her remains. Her skeletal remains were located in a field six miles from the McDonald home. Andre was arrested and charged with first-degree murder, to which he pleaded not guilty.

=== Accused ===
Her husband, Andre Sean McDonald (born February 16, 1979), (Note: This was highlighted during his trial because his wife, Andreen, hosted a 40th birthday party for him at their home on February 16, 2019, just twelve days before he killed her. Based on this, his birth year is 1979.) a Jamaican-born American and a major in the U.S. Air Force, was identified as a suspect in the case. Days after Andreen was reported missing, investigators searched the couple’s home. When Andre McDonald returned to the residence and encountered law enforcement officers, he stated that he did not know his wife’s whereabouts but acknowledged that the couple had argued the previous evening. He later declined to answer additional questions and requested legal counsel. According to court documents, McDonald subsequently claimed that Andreen was receiving treatment at Baptist Emergency Hospital; however, investigators later determined that hospital officials had no record of a patient by that name.

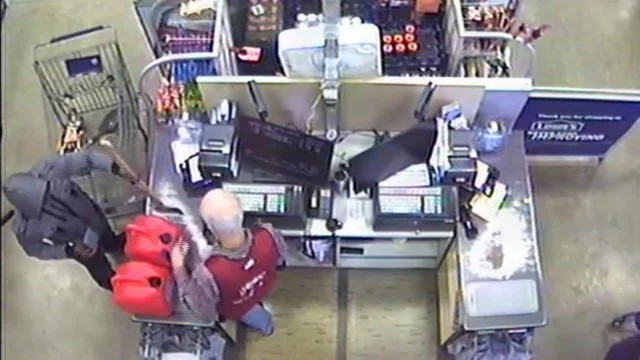
CCTV still of Andre McDonald at Lowe's hardware store shortly after the murder of Andreen McDonald

The following morning, surveillance footage captured Andre McDonald at a Lowe's hardware store purchasing a shovel, an axe, a hatchet, heavy-duty trash bags, gloves, and two five-gallon gas cans. Later that afternoon, an undercover investigator observed him purchasing a 9mm handgun and ammunition at a nearby gun shop. He was detained by authorities, who believed he may have been intending to harm himself, and was turned over to military authorities for a mental health evaluation.

On March 3, 2019, following his release from military custody, Andre McDonald was arrested by civil authorities on a charge of tampering with evidence, based on a torn Lowe's receipt recovered from the household trash. He posted bond and was released in April 2019.

== Trial and sentencing ==
Three days before the trial was set to begin, Andre McDonald telephoned Andreen's sister, Cindy Ann Johnson, and admitted to killing his wife, though he framed the act as one of self-defence. He would repeat this claim at trial, taking the stand in his own defence. McDonald told jurors in a Bexar County courtroom that on the night of February 28, 2019, following the dispute over the business filing, he returned home and informed his wife he intended to file for divorce. He claimed this provoked a physical confrontation in which Andreen threw punches, prompting him to trip her and kick her as she fell to the bathroom floor. He said he heard wheezing and, believing she had merely had the wind knocked out of her, left to put their seven-year-old autistic daughter back to bed. When he returned approximately thirty minutes later, his wife had no pulse.

McDonald testified that he then placed his wife's body in trash bags, transported her in the trunk of his vehicle to a soccer field in north Bexar County, removed her clothing, and burned it in the backyard. The following night, in what he described as a state of rage, he returned to the site, poured gasoline on the body and set it alight. When the fire died down, he struck the body repeatedly with a claw hammer, at one point lodging the claw in her neck before pulling it free.

After thirteen hours of deliberation, the jury returned a guilty verdict on manslaughter but declined to convict on the murder charge. Judge Frank Castro sentenced McDonald to 20 years in prison, the maximum permitted for the manslaughter conviction. McDonald later pleaded guilty to a separate charge of tampering with evidence, for which he received an additional five-year sentence to be served consecutively.

At the sentencing hearing, McDonald’s daughter, who was seven years old at the time of the killing, had a letter read on her behalf by a victim advocate, stating: "[Y]ou killed my mother. You took away my life, and you broke my heart. And you hurt my feelings".

== Aftermath ==
=== Custody battle over daughter ===
Andre McDonald's parents sought custody of their granddaughter, arguing that they were fit and capable of providing a stable environment. However, Andreen McDonald's mother, who lived in Jamaica, contended that her daughter would have wanted her granddaughter to be raised by her family. She argued that Andre's family, given their connection to her daughter's killer, was not a suitable environment for the child.

After a drawn-out legal battle, the court ultimately sided with Andreen McDonald's mother, granting her custody of the child. The decision was heavily influenced by the court's consideration of the child's best interests and the connection she had with her maternal grandmother.

=== Wrongful death lawsuit ===
In addition to the custody battle, Andreen McDonald's family pursued a civil lawsuit against Andre McDonald for her wrongful death. In March 2024, a San Antonio civil jury awarded Andreen's family $210 million in a wrongful death lawsuit against Andre McDonald. His criminal appeal was denied in August 2024.

== In popular culture ==
- In December 2023, the case was the topic of a 48 Hours episode.
- Killers: Caught On Camera - Series 3 - Episode 2

== See also ==
- List of solved missing person cases: post–2000
