= 1st Aeromedical Evacuation Group =

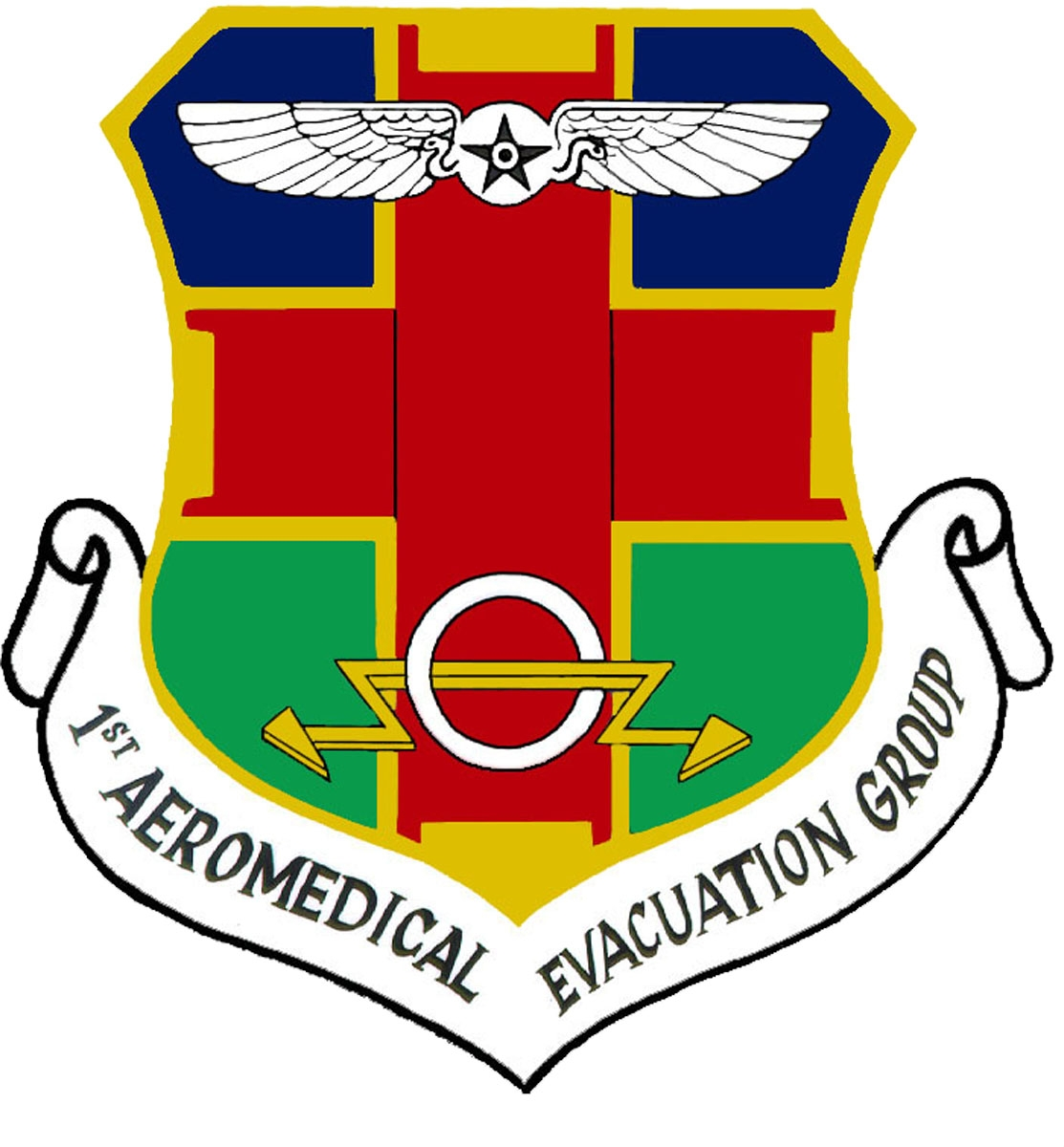
- Active: 1951–1975
- Country: United States
- Branch: Air Force

The 1st Aeromedical Evacuation Group (1 AEG) was a unit of the United States Air Force. It was created in 1951, and inactivated on 1 July 1975 when it was replaced by 1st Aeromedical Evacuation Squadron.

== Lineage ==
- Constituted as the 1st Aeromedical Evacuation Group

Activated on 28 November 1951
Inactivated on 1 September 1954
Activated on 19 March 1957
Inactivated on 1 July 1975

=== Assignments ===
- Eighteenth Air Force: 28 November 1951
- Tactical Air Command: unknown
- Eighteenth Air Force: 1 January 1954 – 1 September 1954
- USAF Tactical Medical Center, 19 March 1957
- 464th Troop Carrier Wing, ca. 15 September 1957
- Tactical Air Command, ca, 1 July 1970
- 375th Aeromedical Airlift Wing, 1 December 1974 – 1 July 1975

=== Stations ===
- Donaldson Air Force Base, South Carolina, 28 November 1951 – 1 September 1954
- Donaldson Air Force Base, South Carolina, 19 March 1957
- Pope Air Force Base, North Carolina, 15 September 1957 – 1 July 1975

=== Components ===
- 21st Aeromedical Evacuation Squadron, 19 March 1957 – 1 July 1970
- 22nd Aeromedical Evacuation Squadron, 19 March 1957 – 1 July 1970
- 18th Casualty Staging Flight (later 18th Aeromedical Staging Flight), 1 July 1968 – 1 July 1975
