= 22d Aeromedical Evacuation Squadron =

- Country: United States
- Branch: USAF
- Role: Aeromedical Evacuation
- Size: Squadron
- Part of: 1st Aeromedical Evacuation Group

The 22d Aeromedical Evacuation Squadron (22 AES) was a unit of the United States Air Force. It was created in 1957 in South Carolina, and inactivated on 1 July 1970.

== History ==
21st Aeromedical Evacuation Squadron and 22d Aeromedical Evacuation Squadrons were activated under the 1st Aeromedical Evacuation Group of the USAF Tactical Medical Center on 19 March 1957 at Donaldson Air Force Base, South Carolina.

On 30 June 1957, the USAF Tactical Medical Center and subordinate units were assigned to the 464th Troop Carrier Wing and relocated to Pope Air Force Base, North Carolina. The USAF Tactical Medical Center was inactivated on 16 September 1957, while at the same time, the 22d Aeromedical Evacuation Squadron was reassigned to Sewart Air Force Base, Tennessee; it moved again to Pope in 1968.

On 1 July 1970, the 22d Aeromedical Evacuation Squadrons was inactivated. All personnel and equipment were reassigned to the 1st Aeromedical Evacuation Group.

== Lineage ==
- Constituted as the 22nd Aeromedical Evacuation Squadron

Activated on 19 March 1957
Inactivated on 1 July 1970

=== Assignments ===
- 1st Aeromedical Evacuation Group 19 March 1957 – 1 July 1970 (attached to 314th Combat Support Group until March 1968, then 464th Combat Support Group)

=== Stations ===
- Donaldson Air Force Base, South Carolina, 19 March 1957
- Sewart Air Force Base, Tennessee, 15 September 1957
- Pope Air Force Base, North Carolina, 20 March 1968 – 1 July 1970
