= 21st Aeromedical Evacuation Squadron =

- Active: 1957–1970
- Country: United States
- Branch: United States Air Force
- Role: Aeromedical evacuation

Insignia
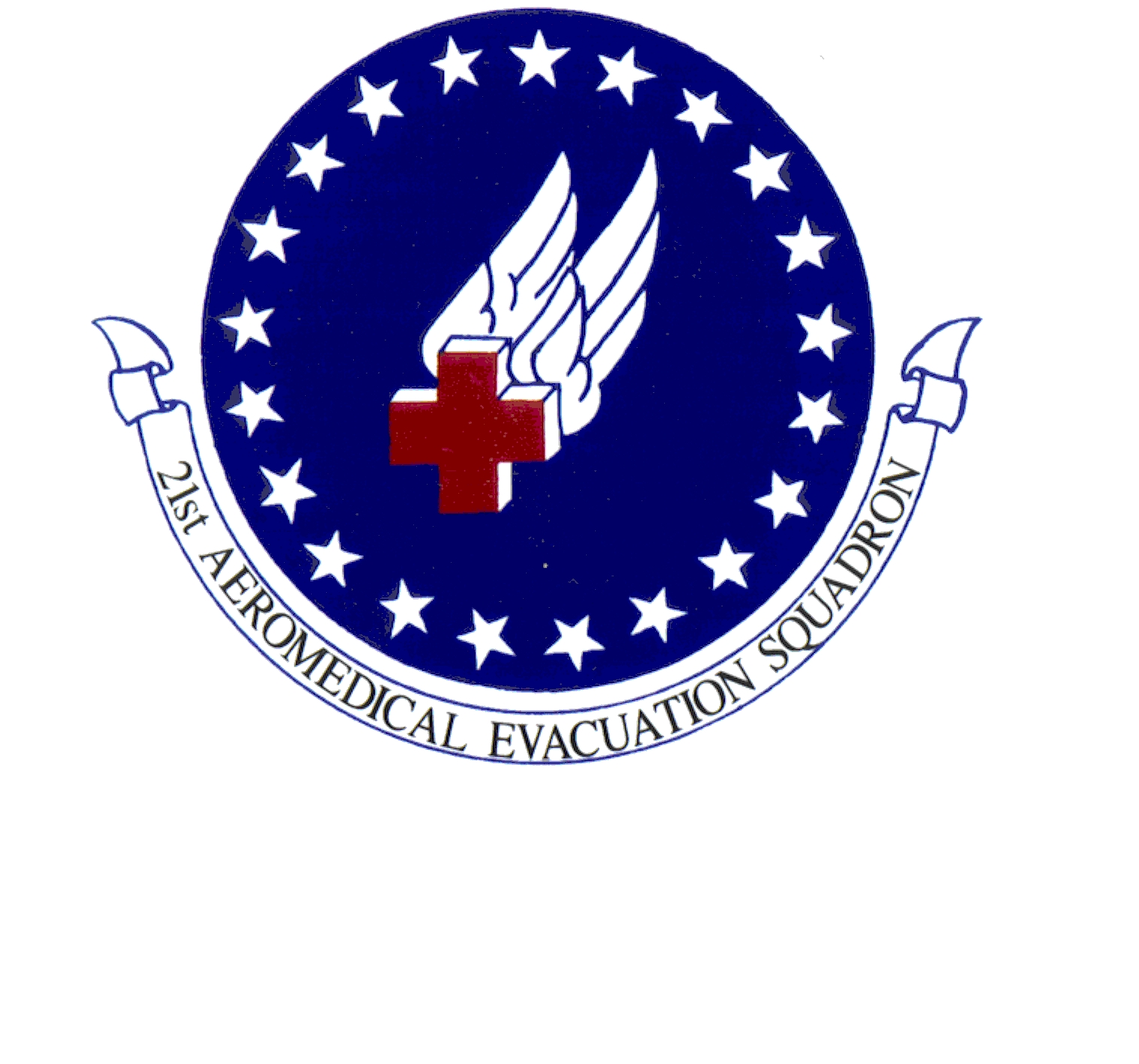
- 21st Aeromedical Evacuation Squadron emblem

The 21st Aeromedical Evacuation Squadron was a unit of the United States Air Force. It was created in 1957 in South Carolina, and inactivated on 1 July 1970.

== History ==
The 21st Aeromedical Evacuation Squadron and 22nd Aeromedical Evacuation Squadrons were activated under the 1st Aeromedical Evacuation Group of the USAF Tactical Medical Center on 19 March 1957 at Donaldson Air Force Base, South Carolina.

On 30 June 1957, the USAF Tactical Medical Center and subordinate units were assigned to the 464th Troop Carrier Wing and relocated to Pope Air Force Base, North Carolina. The USAF Tactical Medical Center was inactivated on 16 September 1957.

In 1965, the 1st Aeromedical Evacuation Group responded to the Dominican Republic Crisis by mobilizing a tactical aeromedical system. Hundreds of patients were safely evacuated to the United States. Part of the 21st Aeromedical Evacuation Squadron deployed to Vietnam in February 1967 in direct support of the 903d Aeromedical Evacuation Flight.

On 1 July 1970, the 21st Aeromedical Evacuation Squadron was inactivated. All personnel and equipment were reassigned to the 1st Aeromedical Evacuation Group.

== Lineage ==
- Constituted as the 21st Aeromedical Evacuation Squadron

Activated on 19 March 1957
Inactivated on 1 July 1970

=== Assignments ===
- 1st Aeromedical Evacuation Group, 19 March 1957 – 1 July 1970

=== Stations ===
- Donaldson Air Force Base, South Carolina, 19 March 1957
- Pope Air Force Base, North Carolina, 15 September 1957 – 1 July 1970
