= 13th Aeromedical Airlift Squadron =

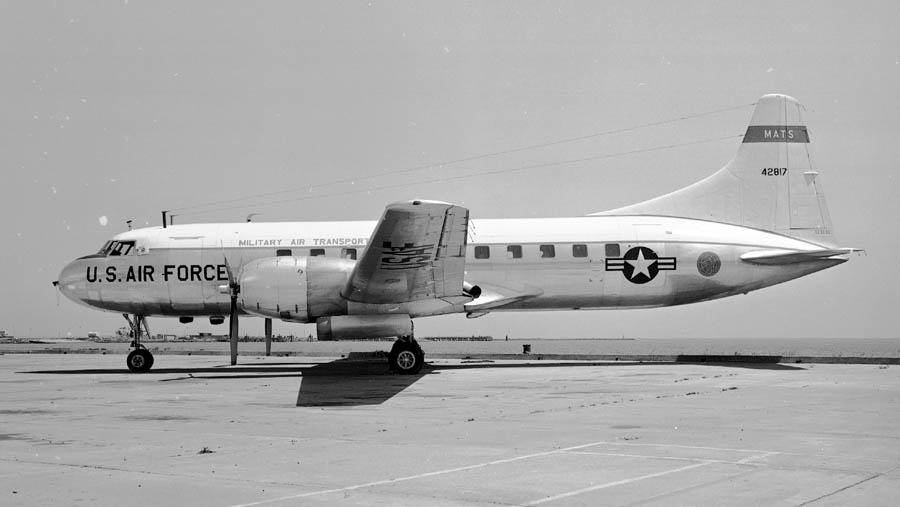
- C-131 Samaritan as flown by the squadron (Note: Aircraft is Convair C-131D, serial 54-2817 at Coast Guard Air Station San Francisco.)
- Active: 1944–1945; 1956–1968
- Disbanded: 1948
- Country: United States
- Branch: United States Air Force
- Role: Airlift
- Engagements: China Burma India Theater
- Decorations: Air Force Outstanding Unit Award

Insignia
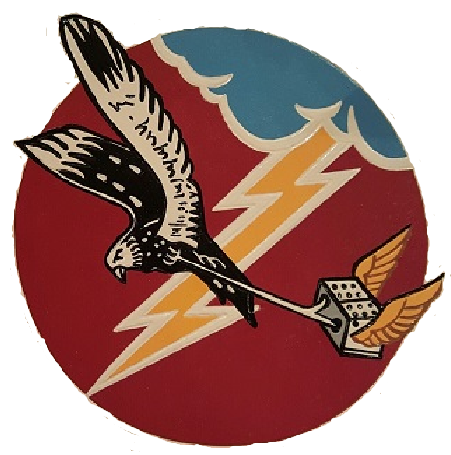
- 13th Combat Cargo Squadron emblem

The 13th Aeromedical Airlift Squadron is an inactive unit of the United States Air Force, last stationed at Travis Air Force Base. The squadron's first predecessor was the 13th Combat Cargo Squadron, which flew men and material in the China Burma India Theater during World War II. That squadron was disbanded in 1948, but was reconstituted in 1985 and consolidated with the unit's second predecessor.

The second predecessor of the squadron was organized in 1956 as the 13th Aeromedical Transport Squadron. It flew aeromedical evacuation missions until inactivating in 1968. The squadron received its most recent designation in 1966. It has not been active since its 1985 consolidation.

== History ==
=== World War II ===
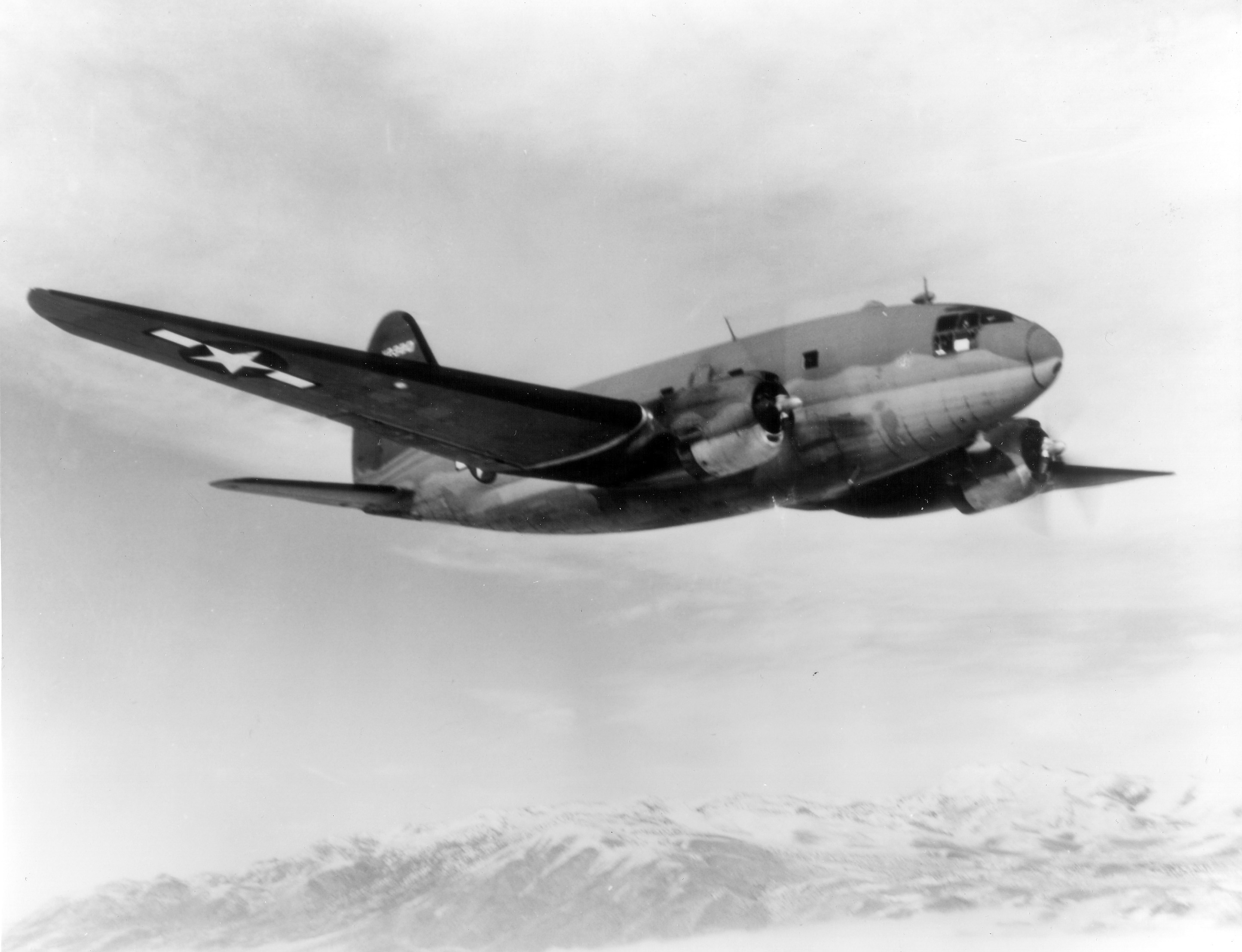
C-46 Commando

The first predecessor of the squadron was activated at Syracuse Army Air Base, New York in June 1944 as the 13th Combat Cargo Squadron, one of the four operational squadrons of the 4th Combat Cargo Group. Combat cargo squadrons were organized to operate independently, with logistics and administrative support from an attached airdrome squadron. In the case of the 13th, this support was provided by the 348th Airdrome Squadron.

The squadron was initially equipped with Douglas C-47 Skytrains. In August, the squadron moved to Bowman Field, Kentucky, where it continued its training and equipped with larger Curtiss C-46 Commandos. The squadron completed its training and began its move to the China Burma India Theater in early November 1944.

The squadron arrived in theater in late November 1944 and began operations the following month. In December, it transported material and equipment for the construction of the Ledo Road. Until May 1945, it concentrated on transporting materiel and reinforcements for forces operating in Burma. In February 1945, it transported "men, mules and boats" as forces crossed the Irrawaddy River. In May, the 13th dropped Gurkha paratroopers during the assault on Rangoon. In June, the squadron moved to Namponmao Airfield, Burma and transported supplies and personnel over the Hump to China. The squadron returned to India in November and was inactivated in late December 1945. The squadron was disbanded on 8 Oct 1948.

=== Aeromedical evacuation ===
The 13th Aeromedical Transport Squadron was activated at Travis Air Force Base, California on 8 November 1956 as the 1st Aeromedical Transport Group replaced the 1706th Air Transport Group (Aeromedical Evacuation). Military Air Transport Service (MATS) had begun aeromedical evacuation operations at Travis on 16 December 1948, when it moved the 1733d Air Transport Squadron (Aeromedical Evacuation) to Travis from Lowry Air Force Base, Colorado, where it had been organized on 9 October 1948 and assigned to the 1702d Air Transport Group. In July 1950, the 1702d Group was discontinued and the 1733d was transferred to the 1704th Air Transport Wing at Travis, and became the primary unit for the air movement of casualties from the Korean War once they reached the United States. On 1 February 1953 MATS centralized its aeromedical transport squadrons in the United States under the 1706th Group and the 1733d Squadron was reassigned to it. The 13th absorbed the 1733d's mission, personnel, and equipment on activation and the 1733d was simultaneously discontinued.

On 1 June 1964, the 1405th Air Base Wing at Scott Air Force Base, Illinois was redesignated the 1405th Aeromedical Transport Wing, and assumed responsibility for the aeromedical transport mission from the 1st Group. Under the 1405th, responsibility for aeromedical evacuation missions expanded to include all of North America and the Caribbean, not only missions within the United States. The expanded mission called for augmentation of the 13th and the wing's other regular squadrons by squadrons of the Air National Guard.

In January 1966, the 1405th Wing transferred it mission, personnel and components to the 375th Aeromedical Airlift Wing, as Military Airlift Command replaced its operational Major Command controlled (MAJCON) units that could not carry a permanent history with Air Force controlled units. The squadron was inactivated on 8 December 1968 as the C-131 was phased out of the aeromedical evacuation fleet and replaced by the Douglas HC-9 Nightingale.

== Lineage ==
13th Combat Cargo Squadron

- Constituted as the 13th Combat Cargo Squadron on 9 June 1944

Activated on 13 June 1944
Inactivated on 29 December 1945
Disbanded on 8 October 1948
Reconstituted on 19 September 1985 and consolidated with the 13th Aeromedical Airlift Squadron as the 13th Aeromedical Airlift Squadron

13th Aeromedical Airlift Squadron

- Constituted as the 13th Aeromedical Transport Squadron, Light on 18 October 1956

Activated on 8 November 1956
Redesignated 13th Aeromedical Transport Squadron on 25 July 1964
Redesignated 13th Aeromedical Airlift Squadron on 12 January 1966
Inactivated on 8 December 1968
Consolidated with the 13th Combat Cargo Squadron on 19 September 1985

=== Assignments ===
- 4th Combat Cargo Group, 13 June 1944 – 29 December 1945
- 1st Aeromedical Transport Group, 8 November 1956
- 1405th Aeromedical Transport Wing, 1 June 1964
- 375th Aeromedical Airlift Wing, 12 January 1966 – 8 December 1968

=== Stations ===
- Syracuse Army Air Base, New York, 13 June 1944
- Bowman Field, Kentucky, 16 August–6 November 1944
- Sylhet Airfield, India, 28 November 1944
- Agartala Airfield, India, 2 January 1945
- Chittagong Airfield, India, 31 January 1945
- Namponmao Airfield, Burma, 10 June 1945
- Ondal Airfield, India, November–29 December 1945
- Travis Air Force Base, California 8 November 1956 – 8 December 1968

=== Aircraft ===
- Douglas C-47 Skytrain, 1944,
- Curtiss C-46 Commando, 1944-1945
- Douglas C-54 Skymaster, 1956-unknown
- Convair C-131 Samaritan, 1956-1968

=== Awards ===
| Award streamer | Award | Dates | Notes |
|---|---|---|---|
| | Air Force Outstanding Unit Award | 8 November 56-31 December 1957 | 13th Aeromedical Transport Squadron |
| | Air Force Outstanding Unit Award | 1 January 1958-31 December 1963 | 13th Aeromedical Transport Squadron |
| | Air Force Outstanding Unit Award | 1 June 1964-31 January 1966 | 13th Aeromedical Transport Squadron (later 13th Aeromedical Airlift Squadron) |
