= 43rd Aeromedical Evacuation Squadron =

43d Aeromedical Evacuation Squadron
- Active: 1997–2020
- Country: United States
- Branch: United States Air Force
- Role: Aeromedical evacuation
- Part of: Air Mobility Command
- Garrison/HQ: Pope Army Airfield
- Motto: Always the First
- Decorations: Air Force Outstanding Unit Award

Commanders
- Current commander: Col Bonnie E. Stevenson

Insignia
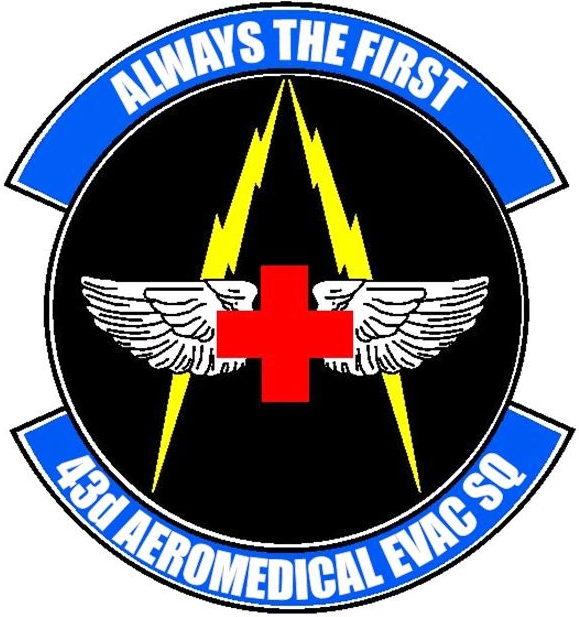
- 43d Aeromedical Evacuation Squadron emblem

The 43d Aeromedical Evacuation Squadron (43 AES) is an inactive unit of the United States Air Force; it was part of the 43d Air Mobility Operations Group at Pope Army Air Field, North Carolina. As the only active duty tactical aeromedical evacuation unit in the U.S. Air Force the 43d provided tactical aeromedical evacuation for U.S. troops and regional Unified Commands using C-130 Hercules and other aircraft. The unit consisted of Flight Nurses, Medical Service Corps Officers, Aeromedical Evacuation Technicians, medical administration and logistics technicians, and radio and communications operators. The squadron was inactivated on 8 June 2020 and moved to Travis AFB, California becoming the 60th AES.

== History ==
The unit traces its roots to the 1st Aeromedical Evacuation Squadron which was activated at Pope AFB in 1975. On 31 March 1997, the 43rd AES was constituted as the result of a change in its parent wing, having previously been the 23d AES; on 1 April 1997 it was activated as part of the 43d Airlift Wing under Air Mobility Command.

In April 1999, the 43 AES deployed to Tirana, Albania in support of Operation Noble Anvil. As part of Task Force Hawk, AES personnel provided support to Army V Corps. Twenty-seven missions were flown on opportune C-17 and C-130 aircraft resulting in the safe and timely transfer of service members to include one injured security police dog.

On 7 October 2001, The US began its war on terrorism and Operation Enduring Freedom began. Later that month, personnel from the 43 AES, were the first aeromedical forces to deploy overseas. Since January 2003 members of the 43 AES have been deployed in support of Operation Iraqi Freedom.

Members of the 43 AES also deployed in support of joint operations related to Hurricane Katrina and Hurricane Rita in 2005.

43 AES became part of the 43d Airlift Group on 1 March 2011 when the 43d Airlift Wing inactivated.

In July 2014 the squadron was participating in an exercise involving a hostage rescue scenario, when Staff Sergeant Timothy Wright was struck and killed by a Humvee. Despite immediate response measures, SSgt Wright died of his injuries a short time later. Col. Elizabeth Shaw, the unit commander, was relieved "due to a loss of confidence in her ability to command" following the release of the ground accident investigation board report. Lt. Col. Russ Frantz was named interim squadron commander pending appointment of a new commander.

=== Lineage and assignments ===
Date	Designation	Status	Assignment	Station	Notes
1 April 1997	43rd Aeromedical Evacuation Squadron	Active	43d Airlift Wing	Pope Air Force Base, North Carolina	
1 March 2011	43rd Aeromedical Evacuation Squadron	Active	43d Airlift Group	Pope Field, Fort Bragg, North Carolina	
14 June 2016	43rd Aeromedical Evacuation Squadron	Active	43rd Air Mobility Operations Group	Pope Field, Fort Bragg, North Carolina	

== Historical unit patches ==
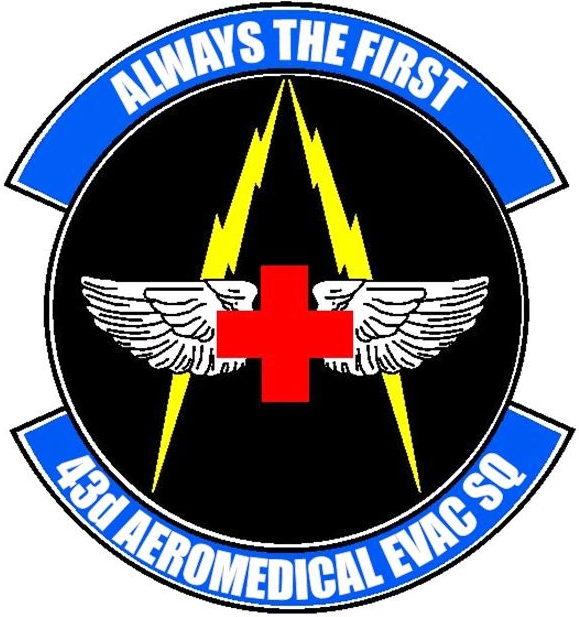
Patch of the 43d Aeromedical Evacuation Squadron from April 2007 to present.

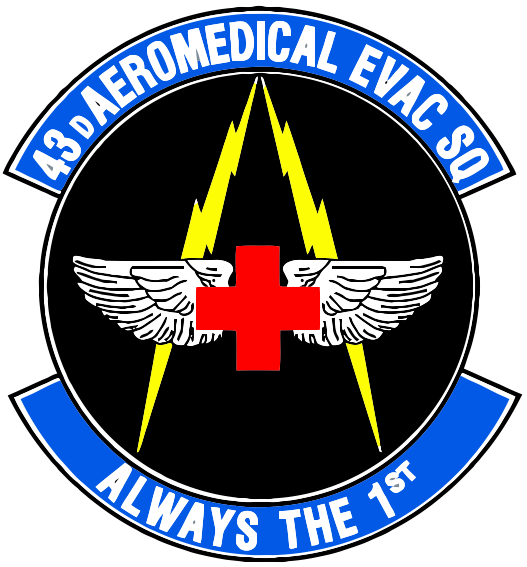
Patch of the 43d Aeromedical Evacuation Squadron from April 1997 to April 2007.

== Decorations ==
The 43 AES has been awarded the Air Force Outstanding Unit Award nine times.

  - 1 Jul 1998 – 30 Jun 2000 (AMC GB-(DP)118)
  - 1 Jul 2001 – 30 Jun 2002 (AMC GB-(DP)028)
  - 1 Jul 2002 – 31 May 2004 (AMC GB-(A1)033)
  - 1 Jun 2004 – 31 May 2006 (AMC GB-(A1)026)
  - 1 Jun 2006 – 31 May 2007 (AMC GB-(A1)019)
  - 1 Sep 2007 – 31 Aug 2009 (AMC GB-(A1)009)
  - 1 Sep 2011 – 31 Aug 2012 (AMC GB-(A1)014)
  - 1 Sep 2012 – 31 Aug 2013 (AMC GB-(A1)009)
  - 1 Sep 2013 – 31 Aug 2014 (AMC GB-(A1)010)
  - 1 Sep 2014 – 31 Aug 2015 (AMC GB-(A1)008)
  - 1 Sep 2015 – 31 Aug 2016 (AMC GB-(A1)008)
  - 1 Sep 2016 – 31 Aug 2017 (AMC GB-(A1)004)
  - 1 Sep 2017 – 31 Aug 2018 (AMC GB-(A1)003)
  - 1 Sep 2018 – 31 Aug 2019 (AMC GB-(A1)003)
