= 420 IPC (film) =

2021 Indian film by Manish Gupta

- Release poster
- Directed by: Manish Gupta
- Written by: Manish Gupta
- Produced by: Zee Studios; Rajesh Kejriwal; Gurpal Sachar
- Starring: Vinay Pathak; Ranvir Shorey; Gul Panag; Rohan Vinod Mehra
- Cinematography: Raaj Chakravarti
- Edited by: Archit Rastogi
- Music by: Som Dasgupta
- Production companies: Zee Studios; Kyoorius Digital P.L
- Distributed by: ZEE5
- Release date: 17 December 2021
- Running time: 98 minutes
- Country: India
- Language: Hindi

420 IPC is a 2021 Indian Hindi-language crime drama film directed and written by Manish Gupta. Produced by Zee Studios and Rajesh Kejriwal and Gurpal Sachar with the production house Kyoorius Digital P.L. It stars Vinay Pathak, Ranvir Shorey, Gul Panag and Rohan Vinod Mehra in pivotal roles. The film premiered on 17 December 2021 on ZEE5.

== Plot ==
The story revolves around a chartered accountant Bansi Keswani (Vinay Pathak) gets arrested for cheating, under Penal Code 420.

== Cast ==
- Vinay Pathak as Bansi Keswani
- Ranvir Shorey as Parsi public prosecutor Savak Jamshedji
- Gul Panag as Pooja
- Rohan Vinod Mehra as Birbal Chaudhary
- Arif Zakaria as Neeraj Sinha
- Shush Kalra as Amit
- Sanjay Gurbaxani as Judge

== Releases ==
ZEE5 has announced the launch of trailer on 1 December 2021 and the film will be released on 17 December 2021.

== Reception ==
Joginder Tuteja of ABP News gave it 3.5/5 stars stating that the film is a realistic drama that could be a nail-biting thriller in an Abbas-Mustan World. Watch the movie closely, especially the last 15 minutes that wrap so quickly. Overall, the film has lots of details packed within 90 mins making for an exciting watch.

Hiren Kotwani of The Times of India has given 3/5 stars stating that the film is an engaging watch. Director has not wasted any time on footage in getting the story from the first frame and handled the narrative skillfully with a few twists. It is a good watch without a lag or unnecessary boring elements.

Manoj Vashisth of Jagran has given 3/5 stars stating that the film is a great court story, good performance and without noise. It does not look incomplete or stretched. All the actors have given justice to their characters with good performance. The simplicity and reality of the scenes were impressive.
