= 426th Cyberspace Operations Squadron =

US Air Force unit

- Active: 1943-1944; 1946-1948; 1993 – present
- Country: United States
- Branch: United States Air Force
- Type: Network Warfare (includes Cyber Networks)
- Role: Cyber Defense
- Part of: AFRC/960th Cyberspace Wing/960th Cyberspace Operations Group
- Garrison/HQ: Lackland AFB, San Antonio, Texas
- Nickname: Guardians Of The Grid
- Motto: COMMITTED TO EXCELLENCE
- Anniversaries: 1 March 2013 (stand-up), 8 March 2014 (renaming)

Commanders
- Current commander: Lt. Col. Cassandra Lee

The 426th Cyberspace Operations Squadron (426 COS) is a United States Air Force Reserve unit previously located in Vogelweh, Germany.

Since 8 March 2014, the 426 NWS has been officially relocated to San Antonio, Texas at Lackland Air Force Base.

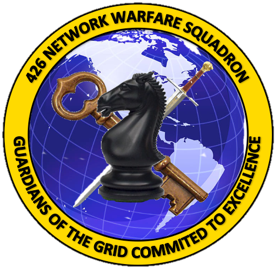
426 NWS Lackland AFB, Texas

== Lineage ==
- Constituted as 26th Airdrome Squadron on 25 Jan 1943. Activated 1 Feb 1943.
- Redesignated as 26th Airdrome Squadron (Special) on 16 Apr 1943.
- Disbanded on 1 Apr 1944.
- Reconstituted on 11 Sep 1946.
- Activated on 15 Oct 1946.
- Inactivated on 28 Jul 1948.
- Disbanded on 8 Oct 1948.
- Reconstituted, redesignated as 26th Operations Support Flight, and activated, on 1 Oct 1993.
- Redesignated as 426th Intelligence Squadron on 31 Dec 1995.
- Redesignated as 426th Information Operations Squadron on 1 Aug 2000.
- Redesignated as 426th Network Warfare Squadron on 5 Jul 2008.
- Inactivated on 7 Sep 2011.
- Activated on 1 Mar 2013.
- Redesignated 426th Cyberspace Operations Squadron on 15 Sept 2024.

== Assignments ==
=== Major Command ===
- Air Force Intelligence Command (1 October 1991 – 1 October 1993)
- Air Combat Command (2000–2009)
- Air Force Space Command (2009–2018)
- Air Force Reserve Command(2018 – present)

=== Wing/Group ===
- 24th Composite Wing (1946–1948)
- 688th Cyberspace Wing (2013 – present)
- 960th Cyberspace Operations Group (2013 – present)

== Previous designations ==
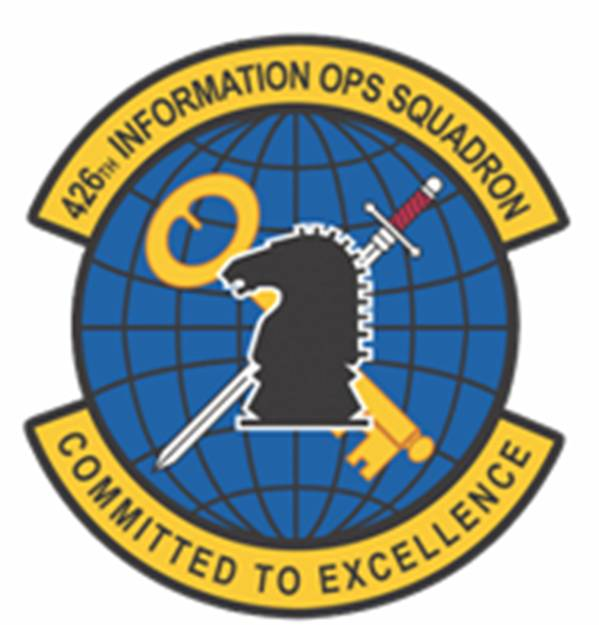
Logo of the 426th IOPS

- 26th Airdrome Squadron (25 January 1943 – 16 April 1943)
- 26th Airdrome Squadron (Special) (16 April 1943 – 1 April 1944; 11 September 1946 – 28 July 1948)
- 26th Operations Support Flight (1 October 1993 – 31 December 1995)
- 426th Intelligence Squadron (31 December 1995 – 1 August 2000)
- 426th Information Operations Squadron (1 August 2000 – 5 July 2008)
- 426th Network Warfare Squadron (5 July 2008 – 15 September 2024)
- 426th Cyberspace Operations Squadron (15 Sept 2024 - present)

== Bases stationed ==
- Kearney Army Airfield, Nebraska (1 February 1943 – 1 April 1944)
- Beane Field, St Lucia, British West Indies (15 October 1946 – 28 July 1948)
- Vogelweh, Germany (1 October 1993 – 2014)
- Lackland Air Force Base, Texas, United States of America (8 March 2014, 2014 – present)

== Decorations ==
- Air Force Outstanding Unit Award
  - 1 October 1993 – 30 September 1994
  - 1 October 1994 – 30 September 1995
  - 1 October 1999 – 30 September 2000
  - 1 June 2001 – 31 May 2002
  - 1 June 2002 – 31 May 2003 (with Combat "V" device)
  - 1 June 2003 – 31 May 2005
  - 1 June 2005 – 31 May 2007

== See also ==
- List of cyber warfare forces
