= 420 Bertholda =

Main-belt asteroid

Discovery
- Discovered by: Max Wolf
- Discovery date: 7 September 1896

Designations
- Alternative designations: 1896 CY
- Minor planet category: Main belt (Cybele)

Orbital characteristics
- Epoch 31 July 2016 (JD 2457600.5)
- Uncertainty parameter 0
- Observation arc: 115.96 yr (42353 d)
- Aphelion: 3.5216 AU (526.82 Gm)
- Perihelion: 3.3110 AU (495.32 Gm)
- Semi-major axis: 3.4163 AU (511.07 Gm)
- Eccentricity: 0.030818
- Orbital period (sidereal): 6.31 yr (2306.4 d)
- Mean anomaly: 220.0218°
- Mean motion: 0° 9^{m} 21.924^{s} / day
- Inclination: 6.6874°
- Longitude of ascending node: 242.661°
- Argument of perihelion: 236.020°
- Earth MOID: 2.33214 AU (348.883 Gm)
- Jupiter MOID: 1.58341 AU (236.875 Gm)
- T_{Jupiter}: 3.132

Physical characteristics
- Dimensions: 141.54 ± 2.08 km(composite estimate); 141.25±6.9 km
- Mass: (1.47±0.42)×10^{18} kg (Note: Calculated from its standard gravitational parameter GM = 0.098±0.028 km^{3}/s^{2}.)
- Mean density: 1.06 g/cm^{3} (Note: Assuming a diameter of 139 km.)
- Synodic rotation period: 11.04 h (0.460 d)
- Geometric albedo: 0.0420±0.004
- Spectral type: P
- Absolute magnitude (H): 8.3

420 Bertholda is a very large main-belt asteroid. It was discovered by Max Wolf on September 7, 1896, in Heidelberg, Germany. The object is part of the Cybele asteroid group, and is classified as a P-type asteroid.
