= 960th Cyberspace Operations Group =

960th Cyberspace Operations Group
- Active: 2013–present
- Country: United States
- Branch: United States Air Force
- Role: Cyber Operations
- Size: Group
- Part of: Air Force Reserve Command
- Garrison/HQ: Lackland Air Force Base
- Motto: Semper Protegens Libertatem Latin Always Protecting Liberty
- Decorations: Air Force Outstanding Unit Award

Commanders
- Current commander: Colonel Richard W. Wallace

Insignia
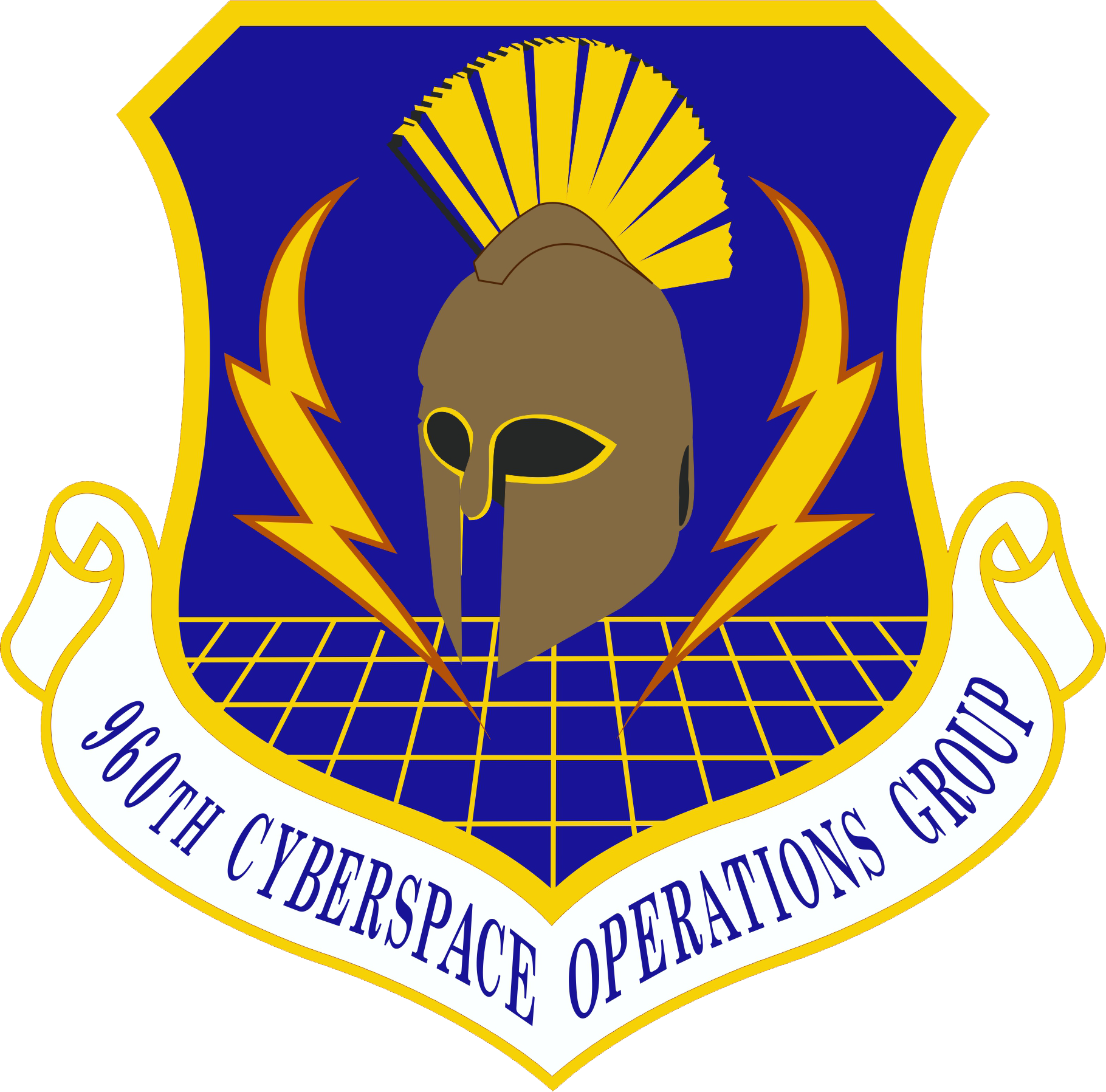
- 960th Cyberspace Operations Group emblem

The 960th Cyberspace Operations Group, at Lackland Air Force Base, Texas, is a United States Air Force group managing four squadrons relating to computer network operations. The group was established 1 March 2013 as a reserve unit of the United States Air Force. On 1 March 2014, the 426th Network Warfare Squadron was again reactivated under the 960th Group. as its oldest part.

The group is responsible for operating and maintaining the Air Force's global enterprise network. The 960th is the largest group compared to related reserve Wings. The group is composed of four network squadrons and multiple combat squadrons located around the nation.

== Mission ==
The 960th Group provides command and control of the network security boundaries of all Air Force installations. Technicians from the group are moving base-by-base and rolling all AF network core services (email, web access, etc.) into a single Air Force Network (AFNet). The AFNet is managed by two Network Operations Squadrons and their associated AFR components.

== Assigned Units ==
- 42nd Cyberspace Operations Squadron, (Scott Air Force Base, Illinois) associated with the 835th Cyberspace Operations Squadron
- 426th Cyberspace Operations Squadron, (Lackland Air Force Base, Texas) associated with the 33rd Network Warfare Squadron
- 50th RANS [Range and Network Squadron], (Lackland Air Force Base, Texas)
- 52nd Network Warfare Squadron, (Offutt Air Force Base, Nebraska)
- 689th Network Operations Squadron, (Maxwell-Gunter Air Force Base, Alabama) associated with the 26th Network Operations Squadron
- 854th Combat Operations Squadron, (Lackland Air Force Base, Texas) associated with the 616th Operations Center
- 960th Operations Support Flight (Lackland Air Force Base, Texas)

== Assignments ==
- Tenth Air Force, 1 Mar 2013 – present

== See also ==
- List of cyber warfare forces
