= Aeromedical evacuation =

Military evacuation of injured officers

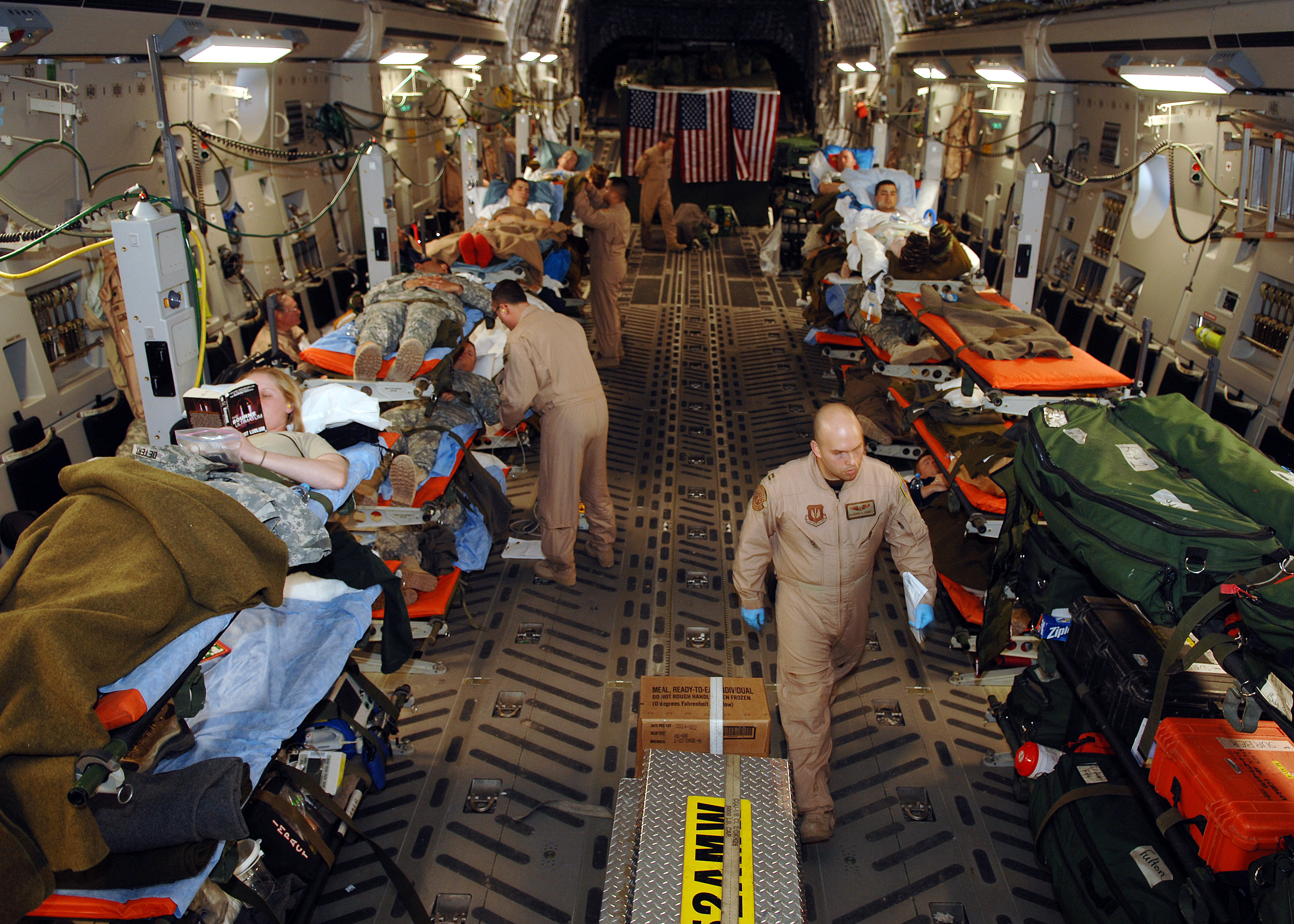
An aeromedical evacuation of injured patients by a C-17 from Balad, Iraq to Ramstein, Germany, in 2007

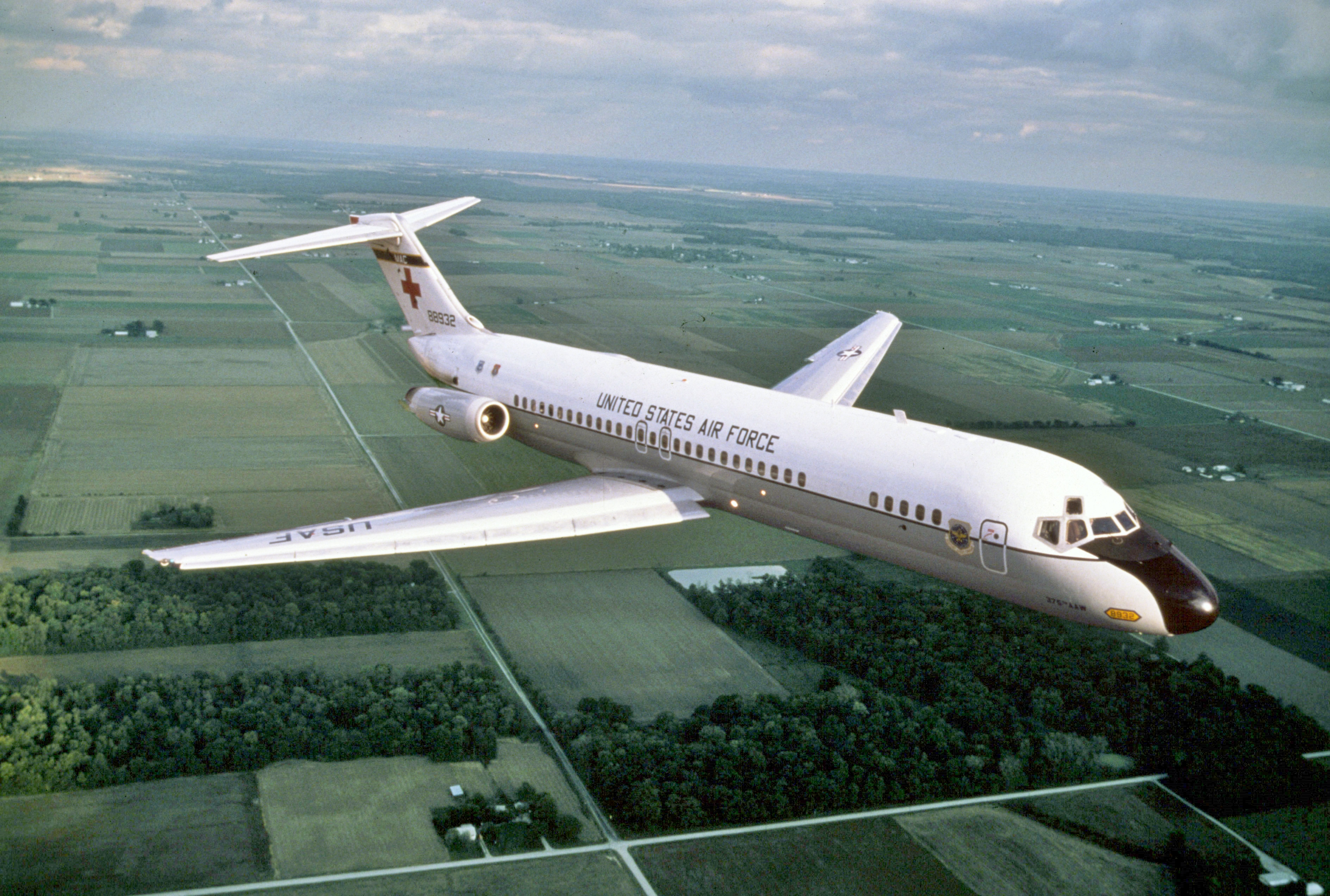
C-9 Nightingale formerly used for Aeromedical Evacuation

Aeromedical evacuation (AE) is the use of military transport aircraft to carry wounded personnel.

The first recorded British ambulance flight took place in 1917 in the Sinai Peninsula some 30 miles south of El Arish when a Royal Aircraft Factory B.E.2c flew out a soldier in the Imperial Camel Corps who had been shot in the ankle during the raid on Bir el Hassana. The flight took 45 minutes; the same journey by land would have taken some 3 days.

In the 1920s several aeromedical services, both official and unofficial, started up in various parts of the world. Aircraft were still primitive at the time, with limited capabilities, and the efforts received mixed reviews.

Development of the idea continued. France and the United Kingdom used fully organized aeromedical evacuation services during the African and Middle Eastern colonial wars of the 1920s. In 1920, the British, while suppressing the "Mad Mullah" in Somaliland, used an Airco DH.9A fitted out as an air ambulance. It carried a single stretcher under a fairing behind the pilot. The French evacuated over 7,000 casualties during that period. By 1936, an organized military air ambulance service evacuated wounded from the Spanish Civil War for medical treatment in Nazi Germany.

The first use of medevac with helicopters was the evacuation of three British pilot combat casualties by a US Army Sikorsky in Burma during WW2, and the first dedicated use of helicopters by U.S. forces occurred during the Korean War, between 1950 and 1953.

== United States ==
The first crude attempts at evacuating patients by air were made on biplanes in 1918. Shortly thereafter, JN-4s and DH-4 bombers were modified by the Army Air Service for carrying litters. In 1921 the Curtiss Eagle was developed, the first aircraft designed specifically for the transport of patients. It was followed in 1925 by the XA-1, which could carry 2 litter patients and flight surgeon in a compartment behind the cockpit. Eventually Douglas C-1 transports were modified to carry up to 9 litter patients and were used on an opportune basis in the US and Panama. This led to a directive that all future military transports be equipped with brackets for carrying litters.

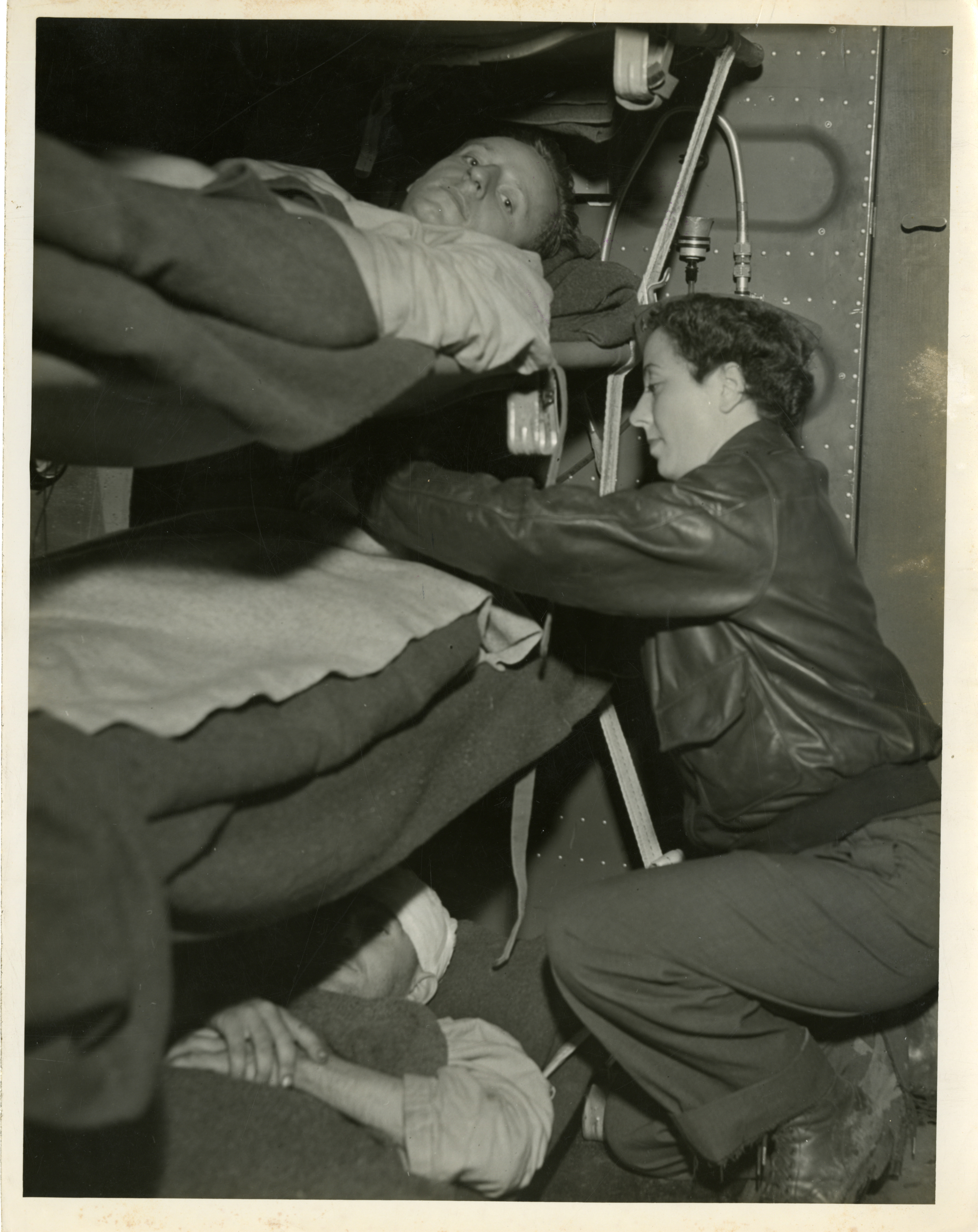
A U.S. Army nurse attends to patients on a C-47. September 1944

During World War II an extensive network of aeromedical evacuation was established in both theaters using C-46 and C-47 aircraft for shorter flights and later C-54 transports for longer flights to large medical facilities in Hawaii and mainland US. The Army Air Corps established Medical Air Evacuation Squadrons (MAES) staffed by nurses and medics who were trained to provide care to patients on air evac missions; in 1942 the Army School of Air Evacuation was established at Bowman Field in Louisville, Kentucky. The School of Air Evacuation was transferred to be part of the School of Aviation Medicine in 1944, now called the United States Air Force School of Aerospace Medicine (USAFSAM) currently located at Wright-Patterson Air Force Base, Ohio. Aeromedical evacuation personnel continue to be trained at USAFSAM at present. The US Navy joined the mission in 1944 by using various seaplanes and PB4Y aircraft to fly patients from remote Pacific islands to larger bases and on to stateside hospitals. By the war's end more than 1.3 million patients had been transported worldwide, with fewer than 60 inflight deaths.

In the postwar era a system of intratheater evacuation was established in the US and Europe, with the establishment of the US Air Force in 1947 came the formation of the Military Air Transport Service (later Military Airlift Command and now Air Mobility Command) and a designation as the prime responsibility for the air evac mission.

During the Korean War the Army began using helicopters for transporting casualties from the battlefield to rear area hospitals and MASH units, Air Force C-47s were then used to fly patients to large airfields where they were later transported on to Japan, Hawaii and the US by C-54 and also newer C-97, C-121 and C-124 which could carry up to 127 litters or a combination of up to 200 litter and ambulatory patients. By July 1953 310,000 patients had been transported both within and from the Korean peninsula.

In 1954 the Air Force received its first dedicated AE platform, the C-131 Samaritan, which could carry 27 litter patients and had a range of 1500 miles, it was later supplemented with the MC-118 and in 1968 by the C-9 Nightingale, a modified version of the DC-9 commercial airliner. A rapidly expanding system of regular air evacuation flights throughout the world was established and tactical evacuation from battlefield areas was improved by the addition of new transport aircraft such as the C-123 Provider and C-130 Hercules. The first Air Force Reserve and Air National Guard AE units were established in the late 1950s and early 1960s, the Air Force entered the jet age in 1961 with the addition of the C-135 transport which was a military version of the 707 airliner; it could carry 44 litters and fly more than 30% faster than piston engine aircraft. Air Evac assets were used for humanitarian missions out of Lebanon and Hungary during the 1950s.

The US entry into Vietnam began a slow buildup of AE assets in the Pacific and Southeast Asia, at the height of the war intratheater missions were flown using helicopters and older C-47 and C-54 aircraft, retrograde missions to Japan, The Philippines were flown using the newer C-141 transport which could carry up to 80 litters or a mix of 125 litter and ambulatory on non-stop routes to Alaska, California and the east coast. During the Vietnam War more than half a million patients were transported.

An extensive peacetime network of air evacuation was established using C-9 aircraft based at Scott AFB, Illinois, Rhein-Main AB, Germany and Clark AB, PI augmented by older prop transports and more recently the C-141 on long-distance routes to and from the mainland US. During Operation Desert Storm thousands of wounded and injured were transported from Southwest Asia, while air evac assets were also used in Somalia, the Balkans and also for moving patients in the US during disasters such as Hurricane Katrina.

The United States Air Force (USAF) has several specialized medical transportation units. Within the U.S. Air Force, AE is coordinated by Air Mobility Command located at Scott Air Force Base, Illinois. There are four active-duty AE squadrons (AES) in the USAF, but the 375th AES, Scott AFB, and the 43d AES, Pope AFB, North Carolina, are the only two located within the continental United States. The European Theater (USAFE) is served by the 86th AES at Ramstein AB, Germany, while the Pacific Theater (PACAF) is served by the 18th AES at Kadena Air Base, Okinawa. The majority of AE Squadrons are made up of Air Force Reserve and Air National Guard units. Also, AMC Air Operations Squadron Detachment 4 [AMCAOS Det 4] operates out of Wright-Patterson AFB, Ohio, instructing Aeromedical Evacuation Initial Qualification (AEIQ) course for all Active Duty and ANG, some Air Force Reserve Flight Nurses and Aeromedical Evacuation Technicians. All AE units are primarily staffed by personnel from the Air Force Medical Service, but are usually aligned under an Operations Group instead of a Medical Group. Aeromedical evacuation usually involves medical transportation of active-duty military members, but in the past, AE also included a significant amount of transportation of military dependents requiring specialized care. Until recently, the U.S. Air Force had a number of specialized McDonnell Douglas C-9 "Nightingale" aircraft dedicated to aeromedical evacuation. These aircraft have now been retired from service.

Aeromedical evacuation was used to transport injured from the War in Iraq (2003–2011), including Operation New Dawn, and the War in Afghanistan (2001–2021), as well as to respond to humanitarian missions such as Hurricane Katrina. Units such as the 43d Aeromedical Evacuation Squadron, located at Pope Air Force Base, North Carolina provide tactical aeromedical evacuation for U.S. troops and regional Unified Commands using C-130 Hercules, C-17 Globemaster III, and other opportune aircraft. AE flight nurses and medical technicians have the capability to fly patients on over six different aircraft. The primary aircraft used include the C-130, C-17, Boeing KC-135, and Learjet C-21. The medical crew is fully self-contained. They have their own oxygen and only need to plug into the aircraft's electrical system.

Since October 2001, more than 48,000 US military servicemen have been aeromedically evacuated during the Afghan and Iraqi wars for both battle and non-battle injuries.

=== Current US Air Force aeromedical evacuation units ===
Air Mobility Command

- 60th AES - Travis AFB, California (C-17)
- 375th AES - Scott AFB, Illinois (C-130)
- 775th EAEF - Andrews AFB, Maryland/Lackland AFB, Texas/Travis AFB, California (C-17, C-130, KC-135)

United States Air Forces in Europe – Air Forces Africa

- 10th EAEF - Ramstein Air Base, Germany (C-17)
- 86th AES - Ramstein Air Base, Germany (C-17, C-130)

Pacific Air Forces

- 18th AES - Kadena Air Base, Japan (C-17, C-130, KC-135)

Air Forces Central Command

- 379th EAES - Al Udeid Air Base, Qatar (C-17, C-130)
- 386th EAEF - Ali Al Salem Air Base, Kuwait (C-130)
- 485th EAES - Kuwait IAP, Kuwait (C-17, C-130)

Air Force Reserve Command

- 34th AES - Peterson AFB, Colorado (C-130)
- 36th AES - Keesler AFB, Mississippi (C/WC-130)
- 45th AES - MacDill AFB, Florida (KC-135)
- 94th AES - Dobbins ARB, Georgia (C-130)
- 315th AES - Charleston AFB, South Carolina (C-17)
- 349th AES - Travis AFB, California (C-17)
- 433d AES - Lackland AFB, Texas (C-130)
- 439th AES - Westover ARB, Massachusetts (C-130)
- 445th AES - Wright-Patterson AFB, Ohio (C-17)
- 446th AES - McChord AFB, Washington (C-17)
- 452d AES - March ARB, California (C-17, KC-135)
- 459th AES - Andrews AFB, Maryland (KC-135)
- 514th AES - McGuire AFB, New Jersey (C-17)
- 908th AES - Maxwell AFB, Alabama (C-130)
- 911th AES - Pittsburgh IAP, Pennsylvania (C-17)
- 914th AES - Niagara Falls IAP, New York (KC-135)
- 932d AES - Scott AFB, Illinois (C-130)
- 934th AES - Minneapolis-St Paul, Minnesota (C-130)

Air National Guard

- 109th AES - Minneapolis-St Paul, Minnesota (C-130)
- 137th AES - Will Rogers ANGB, Oklahoma (KC-135)
- 139th AES - Schenectady, New York (C/LC-130)
- 142d AES - New Castle, Delaware (C-130)
- 146th AES - Oxnard, California (C-130)
- 187th AES - Cheyenne, Wyoming (C-130)
- 156th AES - Charlotte, North Carolina (C-17)
- 167th AES - Charleston, West Virginia (C-130)
- 183d AES - Jackson, Mississippi (C-17)

== See also ==
- Air medical services
- Medical evacuation
- 23rd Aeromedical Evacuation Squadron
- 35th Aeromedical Evacuation Squadron
- Aeromedical Isolation Team
- Battlefield medicine
- Military medicine
- United States Air Force School of Aerospace Medicine
