= 23d Aeromedical Evacuation Squadron =

23rd Aeromedical Evacuation Squadron
- Active: 1994–1997
- Country: United States
- Branch: United States Air Force
- Motto: Tac Evac Brings 'em Back

Insignia
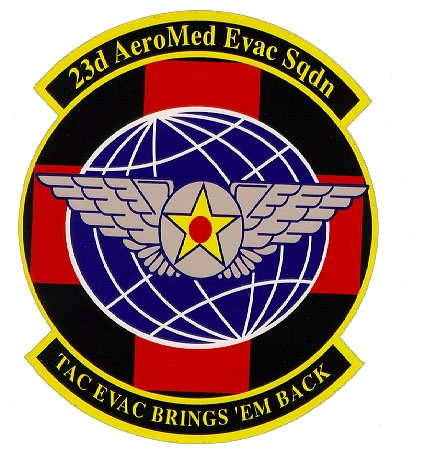
- 23d Aeromedical Evacuation Squadron emblem

The 23d Aeromedical Evacuation Squadron was a unit of the United States Air Force. It was constituted on 24 June 1994, and activated on 1 July 1994 at Pope Air Force Base, North Carolina, assigned to the 23d Operations Group subordinate to Air Combat Command. On 1 April 1997 the Air Force inactivated the unit.

== History ==
The squadron was activated on 1 July 1994, when it absorbed the personnel, equipment and mission of the 1st Aeromedical Evacuation Sqadron, which was simultaneously inactivated.

The 23d Aeromedical Evacuation Squadron has supported several major operations. On 11 September 1994, personnel deployed to Haiti, Cuba, and Puerto Rico in support of Operation Uphold Democracy. In preparation for the Operation, the squadron expanded in size by 300 percent, obtaining personnel from Air National Guard and Air Force Reserve units, as well as some active duty medical units. Personnel established a first-ever Theater Patient Movement Requirements Center, employed an aeromedical evacuation liaison team (AELT) on the USNS Comfort (T-AH-20), and safely evacuated patients to destination hospitals. On 11 October 1994, command and control of aeromedical evacuation operations were transferred to air reserve component units, allowing a rapid transition and redeployment of squadron assets in support of Operation Vigilant Warrior. Squadron members redeployed in less than 24 hours of their return from Operation Uphold Democracy.

In January 1995, the squadron deployed personnel in support of Operation United Shield and Operation Safe Passage. During Operation United Shield, a MASF, AELT and AECC were deployed to Mombasa, Kenya to aid in the withdrawal of US and UN forces from Somalia. An additional AELT was stationed on the USS Belleau Wood (LHA-3) for 40 days to provide a link with USN medical assets.

Also in January 1995, an Aeromedical Evacuation Operations Team was deployed to Howard Air Force Base, Panama, for Operation Safe Passage. Over the course of 20 days, deployed personnel coordinated the safe transit of more than 7,400 Cuban migrants on 80 missions.

In December 1995, the 23 AES deployed personnel in support of Operation Joint Endeavor. Four TAES elements were deployed into the European Theater. Working jointly with the 86 AES, squadron personnel were responsible for all patient aeromedical evacuation within and out of the contingency area.

The squadron was inactivated on 1 April 1997, and its personnel, equipment and mission were transferred to the 43rd Aeromedical Evacuation Squadron, which was simultaneously activated.

== Lineage ==
- Constituted as the 23rd Aeromedical Evacuation Squadron on 24 June 1994

Activated on 1 July 1994
Inactivated on 1 April 1997

=== Assignments ===
- 23d Operations Group, 1 July 1994 – 1 April 1997

=== Stations ===
- Pope Air Force Base, North Carolina, 1 July 1994 – 1 April 1997
