= 420th Air Base Group =

- Active: 1945, 2004–2009
- Country: United States
- Branch: United States Air Force
- Role: Administrative support for Air Force units
- Motto: Together we Prevail
- Engagements: European Theater of Operations

Insignia
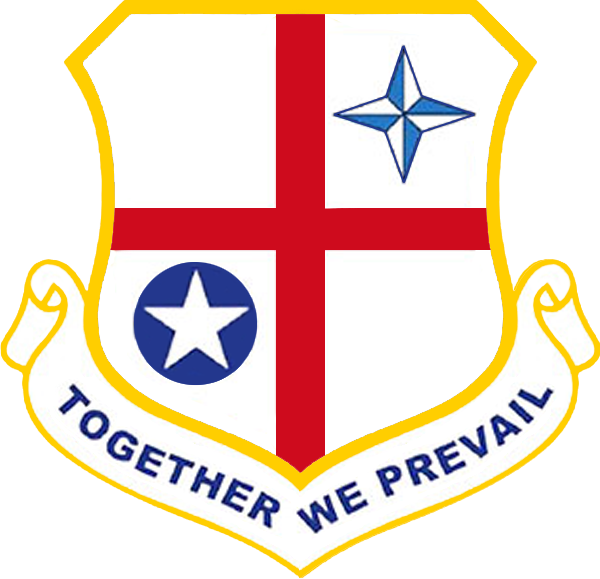
- 420th Air Base Group emblem (Note: Approved 15 April 2004. Significance; Ultramarine blue and Air Force yellow are the Air Force colors. Blue alludes to the sky, the primary theater of Air Force operations. Yellow refers to the sun and the excellence required of Air Force personnel. The red cross denotes the Cross of St. Michael, symbolic of England, host to the units under this command. The Air Force roundel is a reminder of the group’s Second World War roots and its long, proud history of mission accomplishments. The polestar represents the single true course followed by the unit, the vital role it plays in the success of NATO.)

The 420th Air Base Group provided administrative support for United States Air Forces units in England and units deployed to RAF Fairford from 2004 to 2009. It was originally activated in the closing days of World War II as the 420th Air Service Group to support the 493rd Bombardment Group at RAF Debach. Following V-E Day, the group returned to the United States, where it was disbanded.

== History ==
=== World War II ===
==== Background ====
From the summer of 1942, administrative, logistic and maintenance support for Army Air Forces (AAF) combat units was provided by service groups. These groups were designed to support two combat groups, and were typically divided into two "teams." In addition to two Air Corps service squadrons, they included units from the signal, ordnance, quartermaster and military police branches of the Army Service Forces. When the AAF began forming Boeing B-29 Superfortress units for deployment to the Pacific, it formed a new type of support unit, called an air service group, (Note: Initially, designated service group (special).) designed to support a single combat group and composed of an air engineering squadron, an air materiel squadron, and a headquarters and base services squadron.

==== Service in the European Theater ====
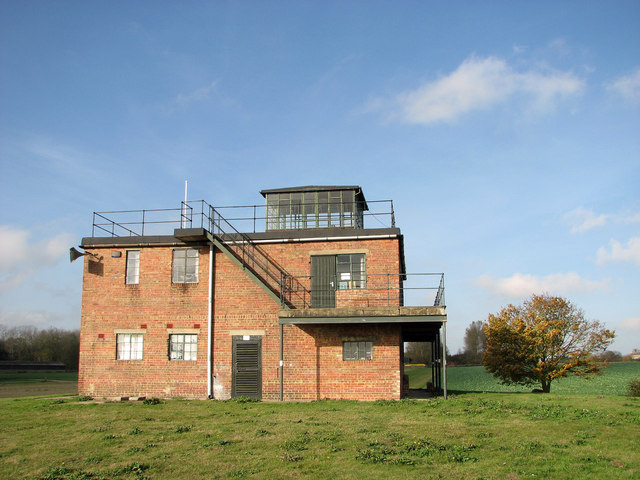
The control tower at RAF Debach

In April 1945, Eighth Air Force converted to the new support system. The 420th Air Service Group was activated at RAF Debach to replace the units supporting the 493rd Bombardment Group stationed there. Unlike the previous support units, which had reported to VIII Air Force Service Command, a support headquarters, the 420th was assigned to the operational headquarters that controlled the 493rd, the 3rd Air Division. Following V-E Day, the group returned with the 493rd to Sioux Falls Army Air Field, South Dakota to prepare for deployment to the Pacific. (Note: The "ground echelon" of the 493d sailed for the United States aboard the RMS Queen Elizabeth on 6 August. Freeman, p. 262. It appears this included the 420th.) However, shortly after the group reassembled at Sioux Falls, Japan surrendered and the group was disbanded on 28 August 1945.

=== Support for units in England ===
The group was reactivated in January 2004 as the 420th Air Base Group at RAF Fairford, England. It served as a regional support headquarters. In addition to the 424th Air Base Squadron at Fairford, it was assigned the 422nd Air Base Squadron at RAF Croughton, the 423rd Air Base Squadron at RAF Alconbury in England and the 426th Air Base Squadron at Sola Air Station, Norway. The following month, the 470th Air Base Squadron at NATO Air Base Geilenkirchen was assigned to the group. The group also hosted units deploying to Fairford from the United States. In May, United States Air Forces Europe (USAFE) placed all its geographically separated units under a single headquarters, and the group was transferred from Third Air Force, the headquarters for units in the United Kingdom, to the 38th Combat Support Wing, located at Ramstein Air Base, Germany.

There were a number of changes to the group's organization in 2005. In January, the 421st Air Base Squadron at RAF Menwith Hill joined the group, although this assignment only lasted until July. In April, the squadrons in Norwary and Germany were reassigned away from the group. In May, USAFE established the 501st Combat Support Wing, which assumed the role of the 38th Wing for its units in the United Kingdom. In this reorganization the group's air base squadrons at Alconbury and Croughton were reassigned. However separate civil engineer, logistic readiness and security forces squadrons were organized at Fairford to replace the 424th Air Base Squadron and the 420th Munitions Squadron was activated at RAF Welford.

In May 2009, the 420th Munitions squadron was transferred to the 422nd Air Base Group at RAF Croughton and the 420th Air Base Squadron assumed responsibility for support activities at Fairford. The group and its other subordinate units at Fairford were inactivated.

== Lineage ==
- Constituted as the 420th Air Service Group on 22 November 1944

Activated on 15 April 1945
Disbanded on 28 August 1945
Reconstituted on 28 October 2003 and redesignated 420th Air Base Group
Activated on 14 January 2004
Inactivated on 6 October 2009

=== Assignments ===
- 3rd Air Division, 15 April 1945
- Second Air Force c. 4–28 August 1945
- Third Air Force, 14 January 2004
- 38th Combat Support Wing, 25 May 2004
- 501st Combat Support Wing, 12 May 2005 – 6 October 2009

=== Components ===
- 420th Air Base Squadron, 12 May 2005 – 6 October 2009
- 420th Civil Engineer Squadron, 12 May 2005 – 6 October 2009
- 420th Logistics Readiness Squadron, 12 May 2005 – 6 October 2009
- 420th Munitions Squadron, 12 May 2005 – 6 October 2009
- 420th Security Forces Squadron, 12 May 2005 – 6 October 2009
- 421st Air Base Squadron, 24 January 2005 – 21 July 2005
- 422nd Air Base Squadron, 14 January 2004 – 12 May 2005
- 423rd Air Base Squadron, 14 January 2004 – 12 May 2005
- 424rd Air Base Squadron, 14 January 2004 – 12 May 2005
- 426th Air Base Squadron, 14 January 2004 – 18 April 2005
- 470th Air Base Squadron, 9 February 2004 – 18 April 2005
- 670th Air Materiel Squadron, 15 April 1945 – 28 August 1945
- 846th Air Engineering Squadron, 15 April 1945 – 28 August 1945

=== Stations ===
- RAF Debach,(Sta 152), England, 15 April 1945 – c. 6 August 1945
- Sioux Falls Army Air Field, South Dakota, c. 13 August 1945 – 28 August 1945
- RAF Fairford, England, 14 January 2004 – 6 October 2009

=== Campaign ===
Campaign Streamer	Campaign	Dates	Notes
	European Theater without inscription	15 April 1945–c. 6 August 1945	420th Air Service Group

=== Notes ===
Explanatory notes

Citations

=== Bibliography ===
- Anderson, Capt. Barry (1985). Army Air Forces Stations: A Guide to the Stations Where U.S. Army Air Forces Personnel Served in the United Kingdom During World War II (PDF). Maxwell AFB, AL: Research Division, USAF Historical Research Center.
- Coleman, John M (1950). The Development of Tactical Services in the Army Air Forces. New York, NY: Columbia University Press.
- Freeman, Roger A. (1970). The Mighty Eighth: Units, Men and Machines (A History of the US 8th Army Air Force). London, England, UK: Macdonald and Company. ISBN 978-0-87938-638-2.
