= 420 BC =

420 BC in various calendars
- Gregorian calendar: 420 BC; CDXX BC
- Ab urbe condita: 334
- Ancient Egypt era: XXVII dynasty, 106
- Pharaoh: Darius II of Persia, 4
- Ancient Greek Olympiad (summer): 90th Olympiad (victor)¹
- Assyrian calendar: 4331
- Balinese saka calendar: N/A
- Bengali calendar: −1013 – −1012
- Berber calendar: 531
- Buddhist calendar: 125
- Burmese calendar: −1057
- Byzantine calendar: 5089–5090
- Chinese calendar: 庚申年 (Metal Monkey); 2278 or 2071 — to — 辛酉年 (Metal Rooster); 2279 or 2072
- Coptic calendar: −703 – −702
- Discordian calendar: 747
- Ethiopian calendar: −427 – −426
- Hebrew calendar: 3341–3342
- Hindu calendars
- Vikram Samvat: −363 – −362
- Shaka Samvat: N/A
- Kali Yuga: 2681–2682
- Holocene calendar: 9581
- Iranian calendar: 1041 BP – 1040 BP
- Islamic calendar: 1073 BH – 1072 BH
- Javanese calendar: N/A
- Julian calendar: N/A
- Korean calendar: 1914
- Minguo calendar: 2331 before ROC 民前2331年
- Nanakshahi calendar: −1887
- Thai solar calendar: 123–124
- Tibetan calendar: ལྕགས་ཕོ་སྤྲེ་ལོ་ (male Iron-Monkey) −293 or −674 or −1446 — to — ལྕགས་མོ་བྱ་ལོ་ (female Iron-Bird) −292 or −673 or −1445

Year 420 BC was a year of the pre-Julian Roman calendar. At the time, it was known as the Year of the Tribunate of Cincinnatus, Medullinus, Vulso and Atratinus (or, less frequently, year 334 Ab urbe condita). The denomination 420 BC for this year has been used since the early medieval period, when the Anno Domini calendar era became the prevalent method in Europe for naming years.

== Events ==
=== By place ===
==== Greece ====
- 17 Boedromion (Epidauria): The cult of Asclepius is introduced at Athens.
- The young and popular Alcibiades is elected "Strategos" (one of a board of ten generals) and begins to dominate Athenian life and politics. A Quadruple Alliance of Athens, Argos, Mantineia and Elis, which has been organised by Alcibiades (in opposition to Nicias) confronts a Spartan-Boeotian alliance.
- Around 420 BC, Spartans were excluded from participating in the Olympic Games due to their ongoing conflicts with other Greek city-states, violating a peace treaty. This exclusion was part of a broader effort to maintain the peaceful atmosphere of the games.

=== By topic ===
==== Drama ====
- Euripides' play The Suppliant Women is performed.
- Euripides' play Phaethon is performed.

== Deaths ==
- Protagoras, Greek presocratic philosopher (b. c. 490 BC)
