= 1st Aeromedical Evacuation Squadron =

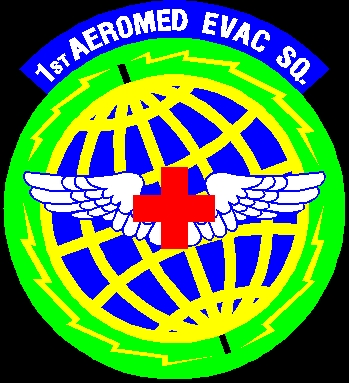
- Active: 1975–1994
- Country: United States
- Branch: Air Force
- Role: Special Operations

The 1st Aeromedical Evacuation Squadron was a unit of the United States Air Force. It was constituted as the 1st Medical Air Evacuation Squadron on 15 May 1951, and activated on 11 June 1951. The unit was redesignated the 1st Aeromedical Evacuation Flight on 20 December 1952, and then 1st Aeromedical Squadron on 8 April 1957. The Air Force inactivated the unit on 8 August 1958, activated the unit on 1 July 1975, and then inactivated it again on 1 July 1994. On 21 March 2003, the Air Force redesignated the unit as the 1st Expeditionary Aeromedical Evacuation Squadron and converted it to provisional status on 21 March 2003. On 18 December 2008, it was redesignated the 1st Aeromedical Evacuation Squadron and withdrawn from provisional status.

== History ==
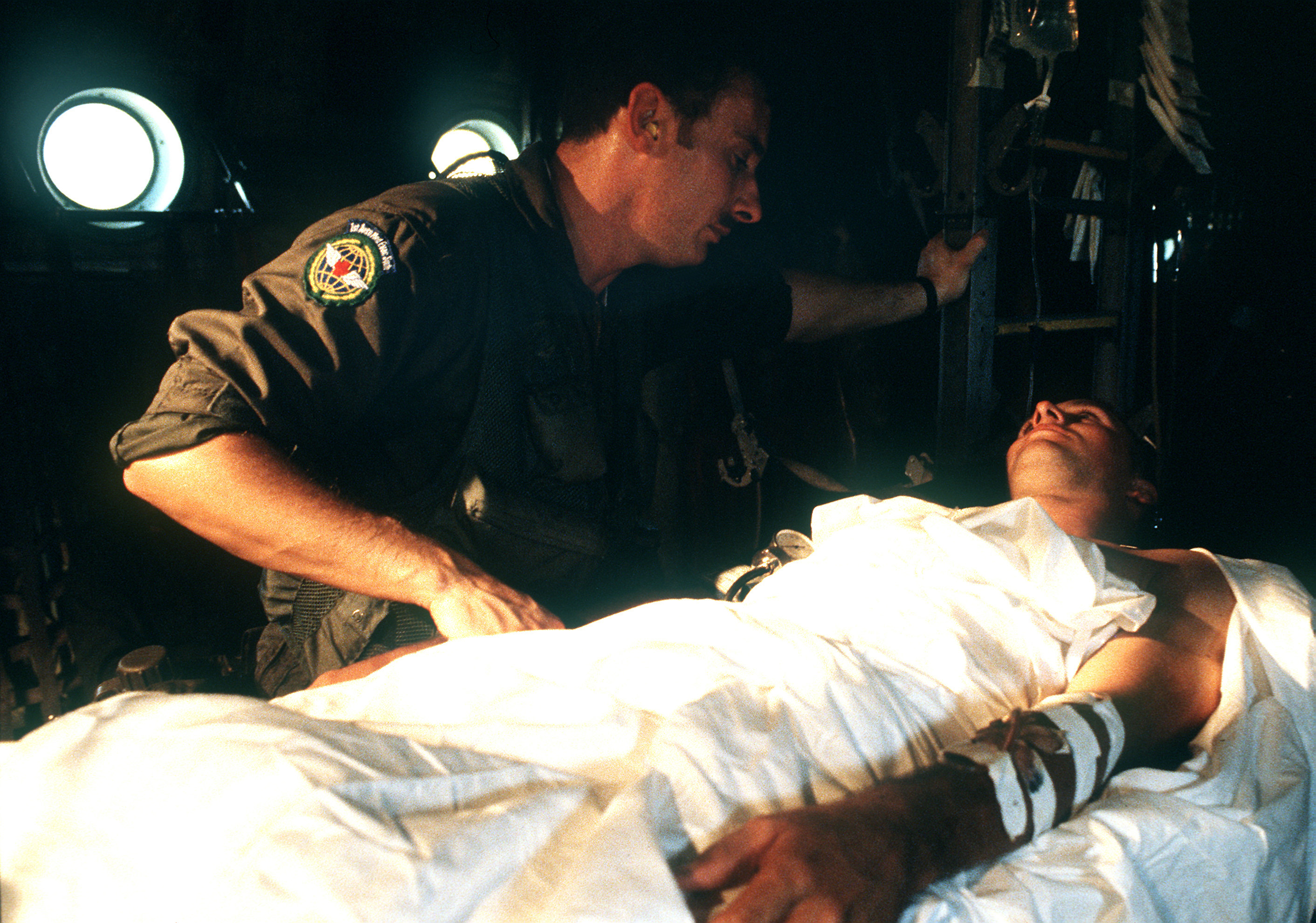
A member of the squadron checks a wounded soldier being evacuated aboard a C-130 Hercules aircraft during Operation Urgent Fury

In October 1983, the 1 AES deployed to Grenada in support of Operation Urgent Fury. The squadron aeromedically evacuated numerous casualties during the operation. From December 1989 through January 1990, the 1 AES was deployed in support of Operation Just Cause. During this period, 1 AES personnel established and supported the Joint Casualty Collection Point at Howard AFB, Panama. In addition to providing life-saving intervention and treatment of combat casualties, 1 AES personnel aeromedically evacuated wounded soldiers to stateside medical treatment facilities.

On 10 August 1990, the 1 AES deployed personnel to the Middle East for support of theater aeromedical operations in Operation Desert Shield. During Operations Desert Shield and Desert Storm, thousands of theater and strategic patient movements were managed by 1 AES personnel. Following these operations, the 1 AES deployed personnel in support of Operation Provide Comfort from May through October 1991. The squadron also provided support for US forces in Somalia in Operation Restore Hope. The 1 AES deployed to Mogadishu, Somalia, on 18 December 1992 and managed more patient movements on aeromedical evacuation missions.

The 1 AES was realigned under the 317th Airlift Wing, Air Mobility Command, on 1 July 1992 as part of an Air Force-wide reorganization, and on 16 July 1993, the 1 AES was realigned under Air Combat Command and assigned to the 23rd Wing. Finally, the 1st Aeromedical Evacuation Squadron was inactivated on 1 July 1994.

=== Lineage and assignments ===
Date	Designation	Assignment	Station	Notes
15 May 1951	1 Medical Air Evacuation Squadron	inactive		
11 June 1951	1 Medical Air Evacuation Squadron	Twelfth Air Force	Rhein-Main Air Base, Germany	
20 December 1952	1 Aeromedical Evacuation Flight	Twelfth Air Force	Rhein-Main Air Base, Germany	
15 September 1954	1 Aeromedical Evacuation Flight	7416 Aeromedical Evacuation Group	Rhein-Main Air Base, Germany	
8 April 1957	1 Aeromedical Squadron	2 Aeromedical Evacuation Group	Rhein-Main Air Base, Germany	
8 August 1958	1 Aeromedical Squadron	inactive		
1 July 1975	1 Aeromedical Squadron	375 Aeromedical Airlift Wing	Pope Air Force Base, North Carolina	
1 October 1990	1 Aeromedical Squadron	317 Airlift Wing	Pope Air Force Base, North Carolina	
1 January 1992	1 Aeromedical Squadron	317 Operations Group	Pope Air Force Base, North Carolina	
16 July 1993	1 Aeromedical Squadron	23 Operations Group	Pope Air Force Base, North Carolina	
1 July 1994	1 Aeromedical Squadron	inactive		
21 March 2003	1 Expeditionary Aeromedical Evacuation Squadron	provisional		
18 December 2008	1 Aeromedical Evacuation Squadron	inactive		
