= Rhein-Main =

Rhein-Main may refer to:

- Frankfurt Rhine-Main, a metropolitan area in central Germany
- Rhein-Main Air Base, a former U.S. air base
- Rhein-Main-Flughafen or Frankfurt Airport
