= 1700th Air Transport Group =

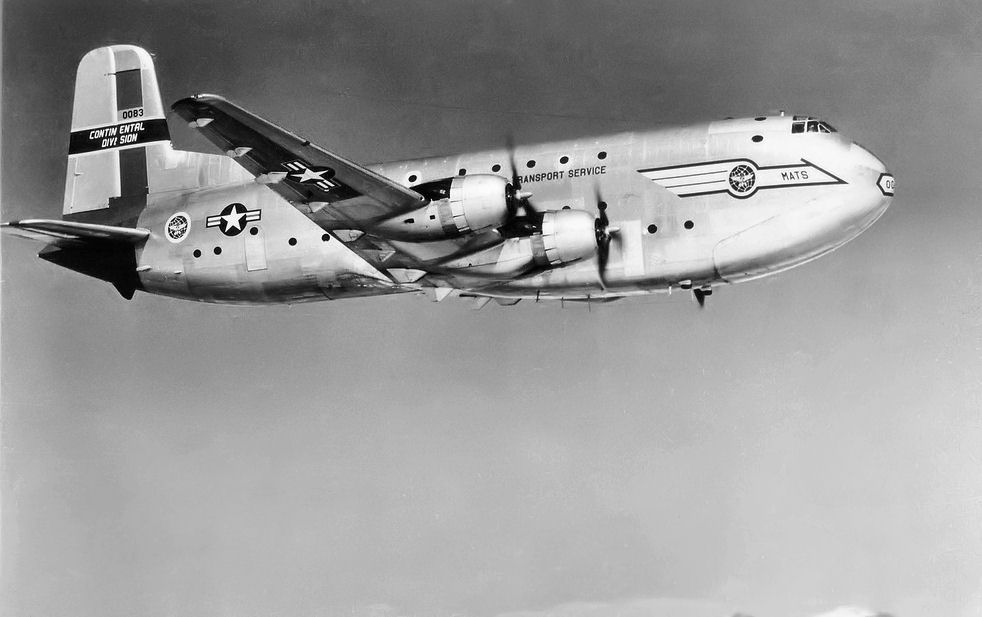
- Group Douglas C-124 Globemaster II in 1952 (Note: Aircraft is Douglas C-124A-DL Globemaster II, serial 50-083. This aircraft was later modified to C-124C status. It was sent to the Military Aircraft Storage and Disposition Center (MASDC) on 3 June 1969. Dirkx, Marco (10 April 2024). "1950 USAF Serial Numbers". Joe Baugher’s Serial Number List.)
- Active: 1948–1957
- Country: United States
- Branch: United States Air Force
- Role: Airlift
- Mottos: Quaecumque Ubique Incolumes (Latin for 'Anywhere, Anytime Safely')

Insignia
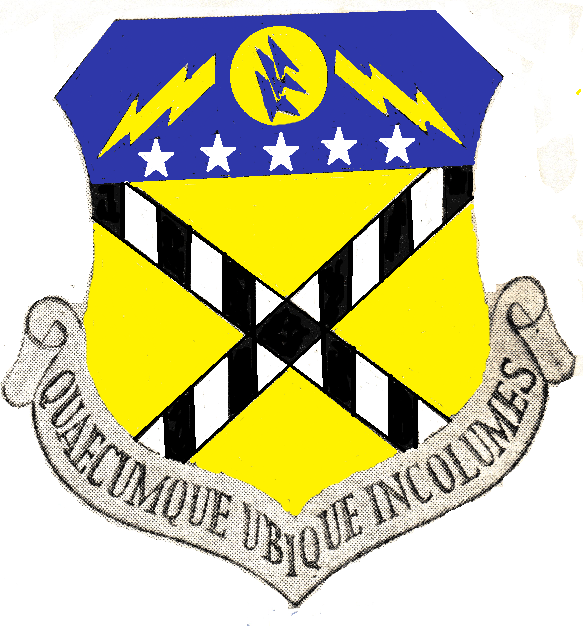
- 1700 Air Transport Group emblem

The 1700th Air Transport Group is a discontinued United States Air Force unit. It was last assigned to the 1700th Air Transport Wing at Kelly Air Force Base, Texas, where it was inactivated on 18 December 1957. The group was organized in June 1948 from the resources of a provisional unit that had been established by Air Transport Command at Kelly the previous year. Shortly after organizing, the 1700th transferred many of its Douglas C-54 Skymasters to Germany, where they served in the Berlin Airlift. It provided strategic airlift until it was discontinued as Military Air Transport Service concentrated its operations at locations on the Atlantic and Pacific coasts.

== Background ==
On 12 June 1947, Air Transport Command (ATC) organized the 5th Air Transport Group (Provisional) at Kelly Field, Texas and assigned four provisional air transport squadrons. the 33rd, 34th, 51st and 52nd to the group. The group's squadrons were equipped with Douglas C-54 Skymaster four-engine transports. The provisional group was located with Air Materiel Command's large aircraft depot maintenance and supply facilities at Kelly. The group and squadrons continued in provisional status until 1 June 1948, when ATC and Naval Air Transport Service were combined into Military Air Transport Service (MATS).

== History ==
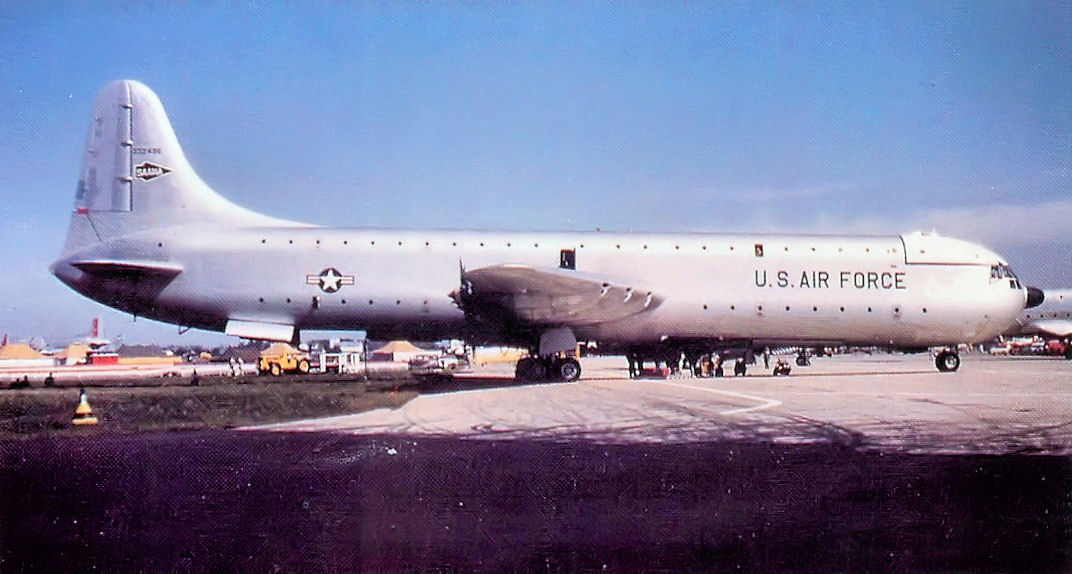
XC-99 at Kelly AFB while attached to the group

The group was organized as the 518th Air Transport Group on 1 July 1948, as MATS replaced ATC. It was assigned to the 518th Air Transport Wing and its 8th, 9th and 10th Air Transport Squadrons took over the personnel and equipment of the provisional squadrons, which were discontinued, along with the provisional 5th Group. (Note: The 33rd and 34th Squadrons were not discontinued until 28 June. Mueller, p. 281.) However, shortly after the group was organized, two of its squadrons deployed to Germany to augment the Berlin Airlift. As a result, on 1 July, the 518th Wing was discontinued and the group was assigned directly to Continental Division, Military Air Transport Service.

In the summer of 1948, Headquarters USAF allotted blocks of numbers to its subordinate commands to use for the units they organized. On 1 October 1948 MATS renumbered its air transport squadrons between 1250 and 1299, and its other units assigned to Continental Division starting with the number 1700. Simultaneously, it redesignated the group as the 1700th Air Transport Group and organized the 1700th Air Transport Wing and other support units, while transferring the 10th Air Transport Squadron, which had an aeromedical evacuation mission to the 1702nd Air Transport Group.

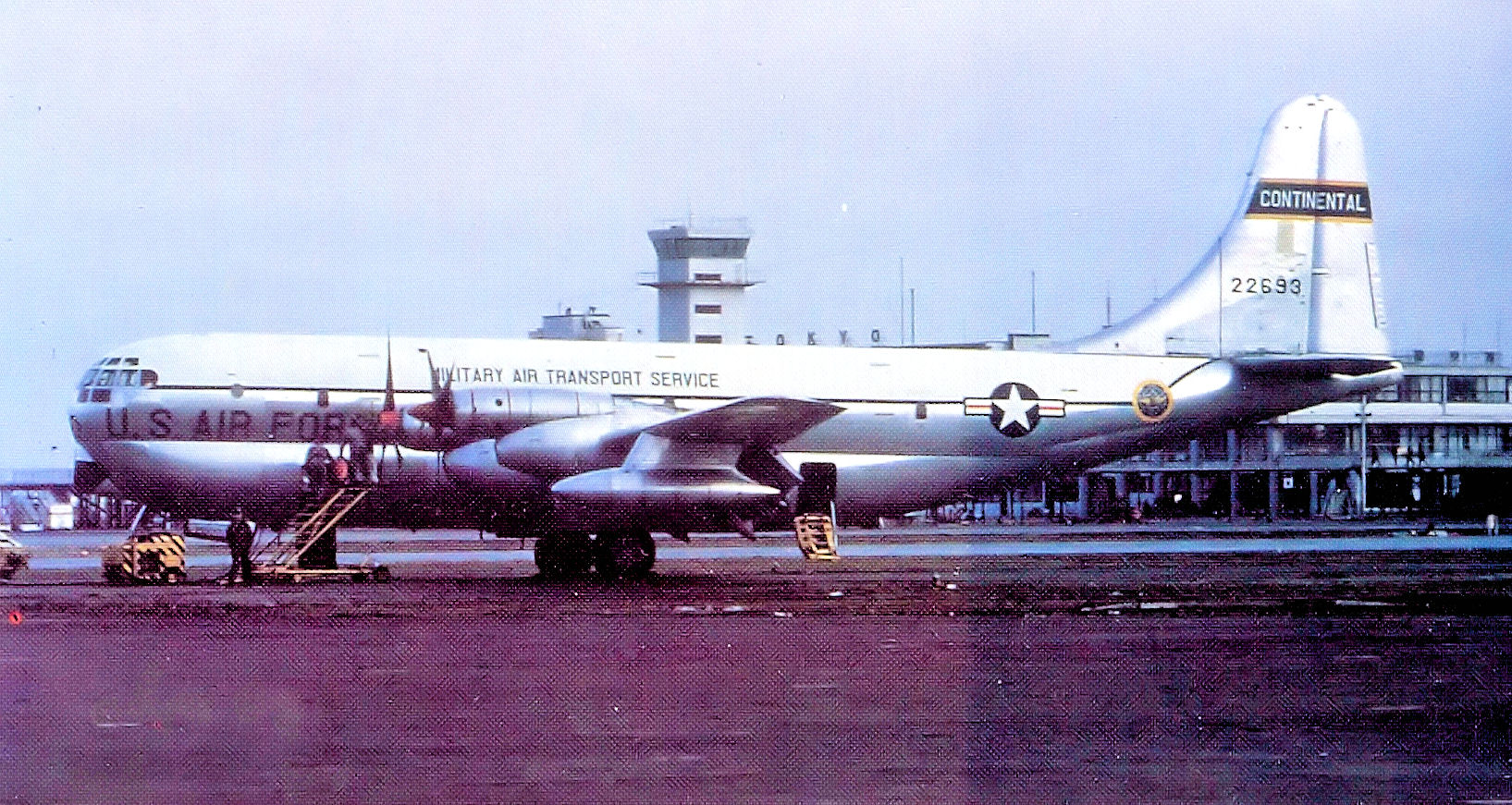
Group YC-97J about 1952 (Note: Aircraft was originally Boeing KC-97G-26-BO Stratofreighter, serial 52-2693. It was modified as the YC-97J, a flying test bed for Pratt and Whitney YT34-P-5 turboprop engines. It was retired to MASDC on 3 August 1964. It was later acquired for parts to build the B-377SG Super Guppy. Dirkx, Marco (7 June 2025). "1952 USAF Serial Numbers". Joe Baugher’s Serial Number List..)

In 1952, MATS received permission to replace its Major command controlled air transport squadrons with World War II ferrying and transport squadrons. As a result, the group's flying squadrons were all replaced. The 55th Air Transport Squadron, assumed the assets of 1262d, the 56th Air Transport Squadron, assumed the assets of the 1275th, the 57th Air Transport Squadron assumed the assets of the 1256th, the 58th Air Transport Squadron, assumed the assets of 1286th, and the 76th Air Transport Squadron, assumed the assets of the 1289th. Shortly before this, on 7 March the group had exchanged squadron numbers with the 1705th Air Transport Group at McChord Air Force Base, Washington, with the 1280th and 1291st Squadrons being replaced by the 1286th and 1289th Squadrons.

The group provided worldwide transport of supplies and equipment to all parts of the world. It operated C-54s, Boeing C-97 Stratofreighters and primarily C-124 Globemaster II transports, frequently forming transport squadrons then once trained and equipped would reassign them to new MATS organizations. During the 1950s, the 1700th operated MATS transport aircraft as well as passenger aircraft.

However, during the 1950s, MATS was realigning its organization to focus on overseas transport. In October 1953, the 55th Air Transport Squadron moved to Travis Air Force Base, California, followed by the 56th in March 1954. The 58th Air Transport Squadron moved to McGuire Air Force Base, New Jersey in June 1955. When Continental Division reduced its operations at Brookley Air Force Base, Alabama, the 3d Air Transport Squadron was briefly assigned in 1957 before moving to Charleston Air Force Base, South Carolina,

In 1957 MATS inactivated its Continental Division, along with the 1700th Group.

=== Lineage ===
- Designated as the 518th Air Transport Group on 14 May 1948

Organized on 1 June 1948
Redesignated 1700th Air Transport Group on 1 October 1948
Inactivated on 18 December 1957

=== Assignments ===
- 518th Air Transport Wing, 1 June 1948
- Continental Division, Military Air Transport Service, 1 July 1948
- 1700th Air Transport Wing, 1 October 1948 – 18 December 1957

=== Components ===
Operational squadrons

- 8th Air Transport Squadron (later 1255th Air Transport Squadron, Heavy), 1 June 1948 – 23 April 1949 (attached to the 1420th Air Transport Group (Provisional) after July 1948}
- 9th Air Transport Squadron (later 1256th Air Transport Squadron), 1 June 1948 – 20 July 1952 (attached to the 1420th Air Transport Group (Provisional) after July 1948 to 1949}
- 3d Air Transport Squadron, Heavy, 18 June 1957 – 24 November 1957
- 10th Air Transport Squadron, 1 June 1948 – 1 October 1948
- 46th Air Transport Squadron, Medium 18 Jul 1954 – 8 April 1956
- 55th Air Transport Squadron, Heavy, 20 July 1952 – 20 October 1953
- 56th Air Transport Squadron, 20 July 1952 – 25 March 1954
- 57th Air Transport Squadron, 20 July 1952 – 18 December 1957
- 58th Air Transport Squadron, 20 July 1952 – 30 June 1955
- 76th Air Transport Squadron, 20 Jul 1952 – 1 Feb 1956
- 78th Air Transport Squadron, 14 Jul 1953 – 1 Jul 1955
- 1255th Air Transport Squadron (see 8th Air Transport Squadron)
- 1256th Air Transport Squadron (see 9th Air Transport Squadron)
- 1262d Air Transport Squadron, 24 May 1950 – 20 Jul 1952
- 1274th Air Transport Squadron, 25 Oct 1949 – 1 Aug 1952
- 1275th Air Transport Squadron, Medium, 24 May 1950 – 20 Jul 1952
- 1280th Air Transport Squadron, Heavy, 24 Oct 1951 – 7 March 1952
- 1286th Air Transport Squadron, Heavy, 7 Mar 1952 – 20 Jul 1952
- 1289th Air Transport Squadron, Heavy, 7 Mar 1952 – 20 Jul 1952
- 1291st Air Transport Squadron, Heavy, 24 Jul 1951 – 7 March 1952

Support squadrons
518th Air Traffic Squadron (later 1700th Air Traffic Squadron, 1700th Air Terminal Squadron), 1 June 1948 – 1 March 1957
518th Maintenance Squadron, 1 June 1948 – 1 October 1948

=== Stations ===
- Kelly Air Force Base, Texas, 1 Jun 1948 – 1 May 1957

=== Aircraft ===
- Douglas C-54 Skymaster, 1948
- Boeing C-97 Stratofreighter, 1948–1952
- Douglas C-99, 1949 (attached)
- Douglas C-124 Globemaster II, 1952–1957
- Douglas C-118 Liftmaster, 1954–1956
