= 7th Air Refueling Squadron =

US Air Force unit

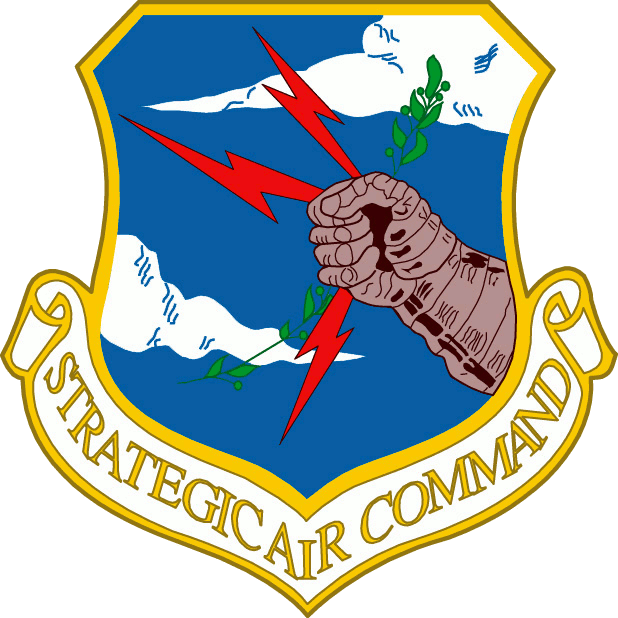
7th Air Refueling Squadron

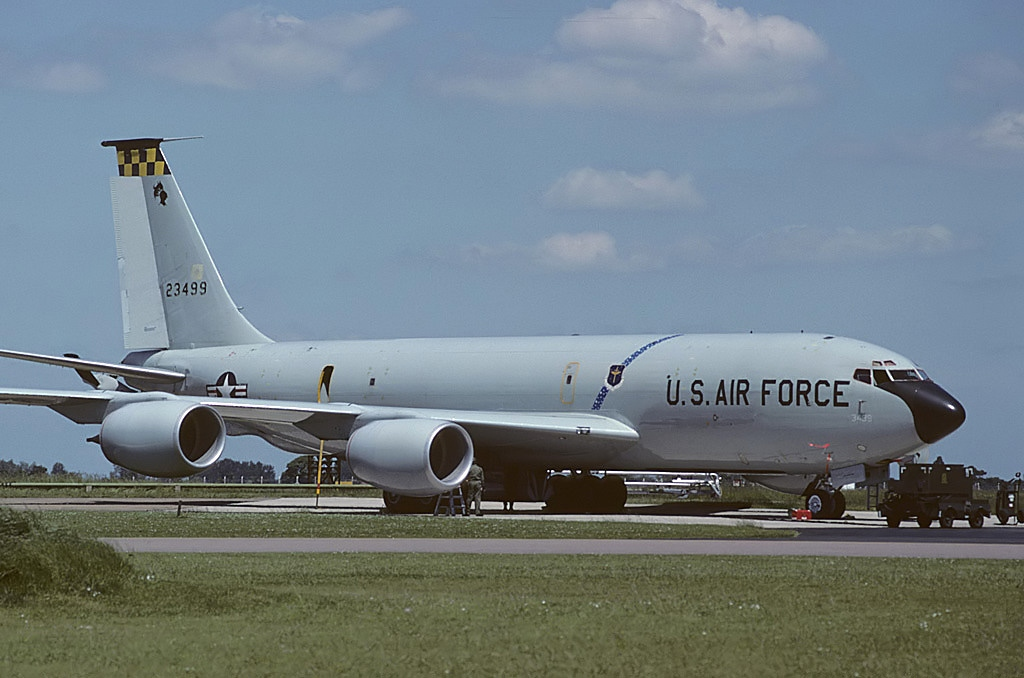
- KC-135 Stratotanker of the 19th Air Refueling Wing
- Active: 1943; 1952–1955; 1958–1993
- Country: United States
- Branch: United States Air Force
- Role: Aerial refueling
- Mottos: Cum Diligentia atque Celeritate Latin With Diligence and Speed

Insignia
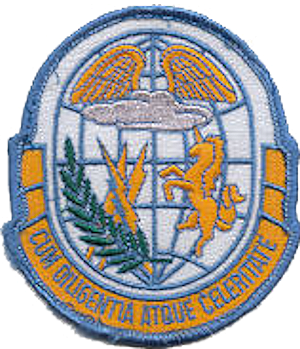
- Patch with 7th Air Refueling Squadron emblem

The 7th Air Refueling Squadron is an inactive United States Air Force unit. It was last assigned to the 19th Operations Group, stationed at Robins Air Force Base, Georgia, where it was inactivated on 1 January 1993.

== History ==
World War II Established in 1943 by Air Transport Command in India, the squadron flew Curtiss C-46 Commando transports from the Assam Valley in India over the 'Hump' to bases in China, flying supplies, personnel and equipment to support Fourteenth Air Force combat units in the China Burma India Theater (CBI).

=== MATS airlift ===
Reactivated as part of Military Air Transport Service (MATS) in 1952, it flew Douglas C-54 Skymasters from McChord Air Force Base, Washington to Elmendorf and Ladd Air Force Bases, Alaska. It moved to Travis Air Force Base, California in 1953, where it was re-equipped with Douglas C-124 Globemaster II intercontinental strategic transport aircraft. The unit flew very long range strategic airlift missions within the MATS Western Transport Air Force area from California to Japan, the Philippines, Indochina and Karachi Airport in West Pakistan during the 1950s. It was inactivated in July 1955 due to budget reductions.

=== Air refueling ===
It was re-activated at Carswell Air Force Base, Texas on 1 April 1958 when its parent unit, the 7th Bombardment Wing received Boeing B-52 Stratofortresses. The unit provided air refueling on a worldwide basis for over 30 years with Boeing KC-135 Stratotankers. The squadron was not operational 6 May – 1 December 1965 and 10 December 1969 – 31 March 1970 due to operations in Southeast Asia. All aircrews and aircraft were deployed or on loan to provisional units at Kadena Air Base, Okinawa, Andersen Air Force Base, Guam or U-Tapao Royal Thai Naval Airfield, Thailand. On 19 September 1985 the 7th Air Refueling Squadron was consolidated with the 77th Air Transport Squadron.

It remained assigned to the 7th Wing at Carswell until 1 June 1992. Reassigned to the 19th Operations Group at Robins AFB, the squadron was inactivated in 1993 as part of the post Cold War drawdown of the USAF.

== Lineage ==
77th Air Transport Squadron

- Constituted as the 77th Air Corps Ferrying Squadron on 30 January 1943

Activated on 22 February 1943
Redesignated 77th Transport Squadron on 1 July 1943
Disbanded on 1 December 1943

- Reconstituted on 16 September 1952 as the 77th Air Transport Squadron, Heavy

Activated on 24 September 1952
Inactivated on 1 July 1955

- Consolidated on 19 September 1985 with the 7th Air Refueling Squadron as the 7th Air Refueling Squadron

7th Air Refueling Squadron

- Constituted as the 7th Air Refueling Squadron, Heavy on 28 January 1958

Activated on 1 April 1958

- Consolidated on 19 September 1985 with the 77th Air Transport Squadron

Redesignated 7th Air Refueling Squadron on 1 September 1991

- Activated on 1 June 1992

Inactivated on 1 January 1993

=== Assignments ===
- 22d Ferrying Group (later 22d Transport Group), 22 February 1943 – 1 December 1943
- 1705th Air Transport Group, 24 September 1952
- 1501st Air Transport Group, 20 November 1953 – 1 July 1955
- 7th Bombardment Wing, 1 April 1958
- 19th Operations Group, 1 June 1992 – 1 January 1993

=== Stations ===
- Chabua Airfield, Assam, India, 22 February 1943
- Jorhat Airfield, Assam, India, April – December 1943
- McChord Air Force Base, Washington, 24 September 1952
- Travis Air Force Base, California 20 November 1953 – 1 July 1955
- Carswell Air Force Base, Texas, 1 April 1958
- Robins Air Force Base, Georgia, 1 June 1992 – 1 January 1993

=== Aircraft ===
- Curtiss C-46 Commando 1943
- C-54 Skymaster, 1952–1953
- Boeing C-97 Stratofreighter, 1953–1955
- KC-135 Stratotanker, 1958–1992, 1992–1993
