= 1705th Air Transport Group =

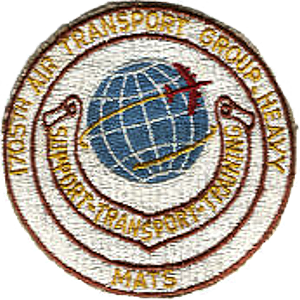
- Emblem of the 1705th Air Transport Group
- Active: 1950–1951 (Wing) 1952–1960 (Group)
- Country: United States
- Branch: United States Air Force
- Role: Airlift

The 1705th Air Transport Wing is a discontinued United States Air Force unit. It was assigned to the Continental Division, Military Air Transport Service at McChord Air Force Base, Washington. It was discontinued on 1 October 1951.

The 1705th Air Transport Group is also a discontinued United States Air Force unit. It was assigned to the Western Transport Air Force of MATS and was also stationed at McChord Air Force Base. It was discontinued on 18 June 1960 and most personnel and equipment were reassigned to 62d Air Transport Wing. Although both units were located at the same base and have similar names they are not otherwise related to one another.

== History ==
The 1705th Air Transport Wing was established in August 1950 by Military Air Transport Service (MATS) as part of its Continental Division, Military Air Transport Service. It drew its personnel and equipment from the North Pacific Air Transport Wing, (Provisional), which MATS had organized at McChord Air Force Base, Washington on 26 July. Its operational group was the 61st Troop Carrier Group, which had moved to McChord from Germany following the Berlin Airlift, and flew Douglas C-54 Skymasters providing transport of equipment and supplies to Ladd Air Force Base and Elmendorf Air Force Base, Alaska. However, the group was detached to Far East Air Forces starting in December. The wing was discontinued in October 1951.

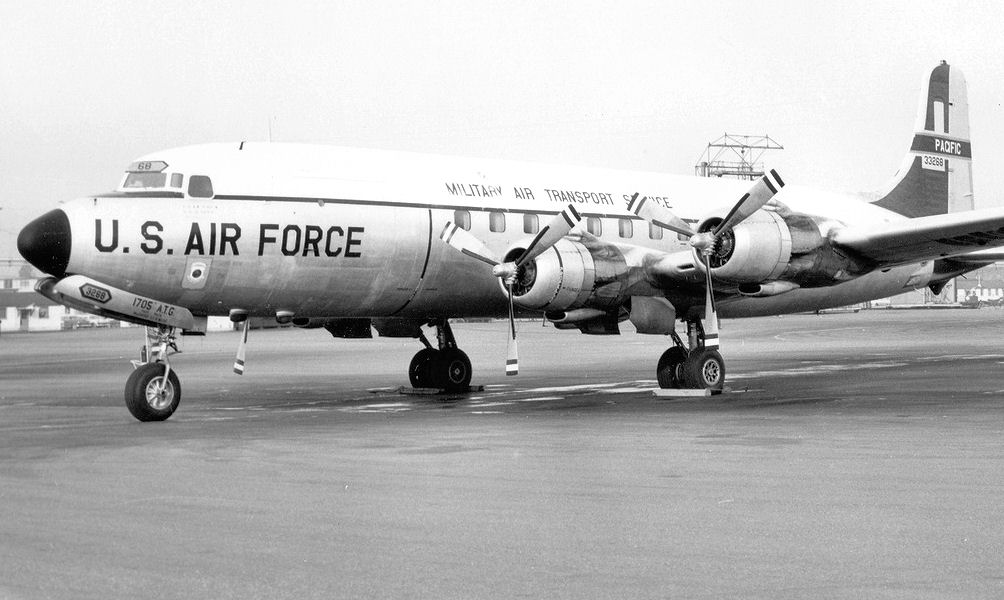
Douglas C-118A Liftmaster 53-3268 1705 ATG MATS about 1956

The 1705th Air Transport Group was established in January 1952. It received new Douglas C-124C Globemaster II aircraft upon activation of the group, began the transition to new aircraft, becoming operational in July. It conducted heavy global strategic airlift throughout the Pacific and South Asia, including Hawaii and Alaska. The 1705th Air Traffic Squadron (later 1705th Air Terminal Squadron) was organized on 1 February 1953 for the operation of McChord personnel aerial port and passenger terminal.

The 34th Air Transport Squadron inactivated in July 1955 due to budget restraints after transitioning to Douglas C-118 Liftmaster aircraft; 32d Air Transport Squadron operated C-124Cs, th 33d Air Ttansport Squadron began MATS passenger service to aerial ports in Hawaii and Japan in 1955 using C-118 Liftmasters reassigned from inactivated 34th Air Transport Service.

The grooup was inactivated in 1960 when the Air Force controlled 62d Troop Carrier Wing moved to McChord from Larson Air Force Base, Washington when Strategic Air Command assumed control of Larson. its squadrons were inactivated and their assets were transferred to units of the 62d Wing. The group was discontinued ten days later

=== Lineage ===
1705th Air Transport Wing

- Designated as the 1705th Air Transport Wing and organized on 24 August 1950

Discontinued on 1 October 1951

1705th Air Transport Group

- Designated as the 1705th Air Transport Group, Heavy and organized on 24 January 1952

Discontinued on 18 June 1960

=== Assignments ===
- Continental Division, Military Air Transport Service, 24 August 1950 – 1 October 1951
- Continental Division, Military Air Transport Service (later Western Transport Air Force), 1 January 1952 – 18 June 1960

=== Components ===
1705th Air Transport Wing

- 61st Troop Carrier Group: Attached 24 August – 10 December 1950, Assigned 1 January – 1 October 1951 (attached to Far East Air Forces to 315th Air Division, FEAF)

1705th Air Transport Group

- 32d Air Transport Squadron, 20 July 1952 – 8 June 1960 (Note: Mueller, in a typographic error identifies this as the 23rd Air Transport Squadron.)
- 33d Air Transport Squadron, 20 July 1952 – 8 June 1960
- 34th Air Transport Squadron, 20 July 1952 – 1 July 1955
- 77th Air Transport Squadron, 24 September 1952 – 19 November 1953
- 1280th Air Transport Squadron, 7 March 1952 – 20 July 1952
- 1284th Air Transport Squadron, 1 June 1952 – 20 July 1952
- 1286th Air Transport Squadron, 24 January 1952 – 7 March 1952
- 1289th Air Transport Squadron, 24 January 1952 – 7 March 1952
- 1705th Air Traffic Squadron (later 1705th Air Terminal Squadron), 1 February 1953 – 18 June 1960
- 1705th Maintenance Squadron (later 1705th Field Maintenance Squadron), 24 January 1952 – 18 June 1960
- 1705th Periodic Maintenance Squadron, 1 February 1953 – 18 June 1960
- 1291st Air Transport Squadron, 7 March 1952 – 20 July 1952
- 1740th Air Transport Squadron, 5 September 1951 – 20 July 1952

=== Stations ===
- McChord Air Force Base, Washington, 1 August 1950 – 1 October 1951
- McChord Air Force Base, Washington, 24 January 1952 – 18 June 1960

=== Aircraft ===
- Douglas C-54 Skymaster, 1950–1953
- Douglas C-124 Globemaster II, 1952–1960
- Douglas C-118 Liftmaster, 1955–1960
