= 55th Aeromedical Airlift Squadron =

Aeromedical Airlift Squadron i

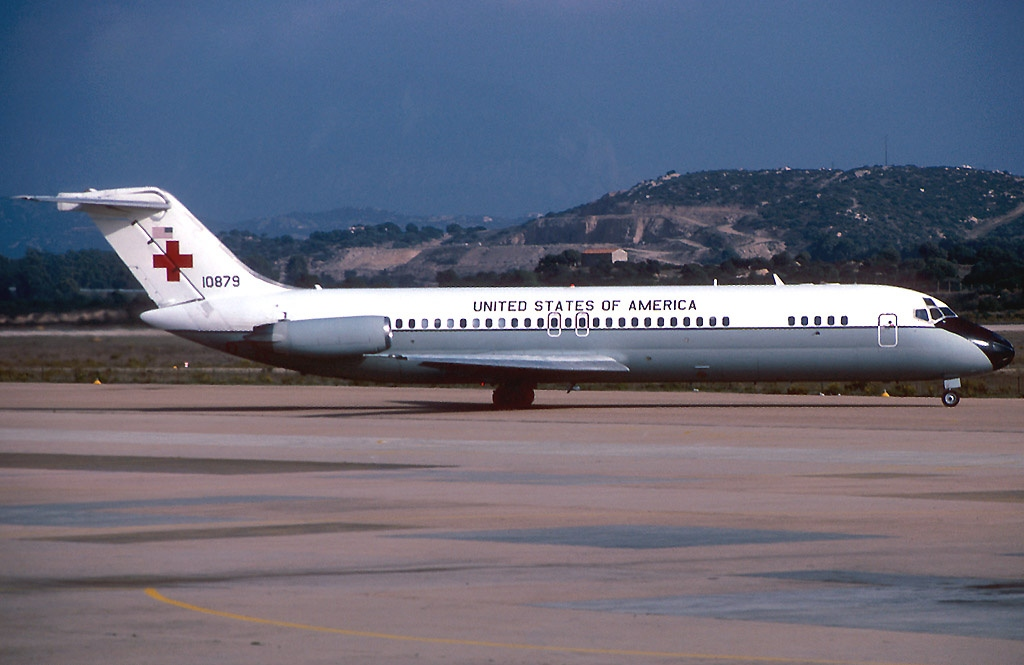
- C-9A Nightingale at an Italian airfield
- Active: 1942–1943; 1952–1960; 1966–1968; 1968–1993
- Country: United States
- Branch: United States Air Force
- Role: Medical evacuation
- Motto: Air Evac
- Decorations: Air Force Outstanding Unit Award

Insignia
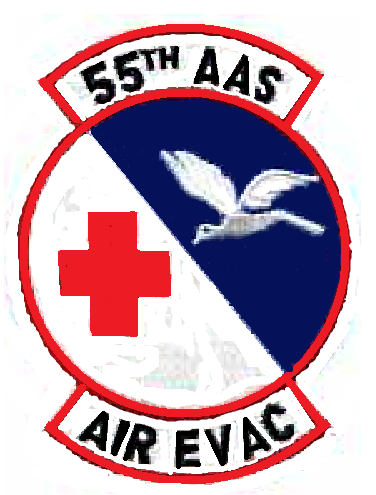
- 55th Aeromedical Airlift Squadron emblem

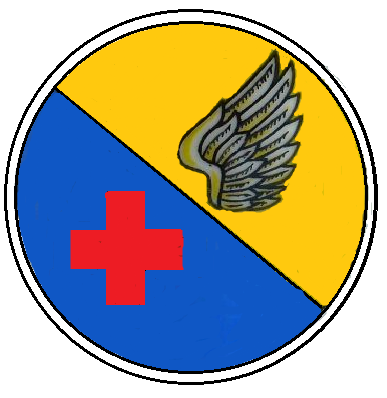
- 55th Military Airlift Squadron emblem

The 55th Aeromedical Airlift Squadron is an inactive United States Air Force unit. It was first activated during World War II as the 55th Ferrying Squadron. It deployed to Canada and managed a station on the ALSIB ferrying route.

The squadron was reconstituted in July 1952 as the 55th Air Transport Squadron. It flew strategic airlift missions from Kelly Air Force Base, Texas, then from Travis Air Force Base, California until inactivating in 1960 when its Boeing C-97 Stratofreighters were retired.

It was activated again in Germany early in 1966 as the 55th Military Airlift Squadron. After assuming the primary role of aeromedical evacuation, it was redesignated the 55th Aeromedical Evacuation Squadron and remained the primary aeromedical airlift unit in Europe until inactivating in 1993.

== History ==
=== World War II ===
The squadron was first organized at Camp Luna, New Mexico in September 1942 as the 55th Ferrying Squadron, one of four original squadrons of the 16th Ferrying Group, whose cadre was provided by the 40th Ferrying Squadron. The following month the group and squadron moved to Churchill in Manitoba, Canada to help manage the ferrying of planes to the Soviet Union over the ALSIB route. In 1943, Air Transport Command (ATC) adopted a form of organization in which each ATC Station was managed by a unified station organization. The squadron was disbanded in this reorganization.

=== Airlift in the United States ===
Background

On 1 June 1948, Military Air Transport Service (MATS) implemented the wing base reorganization. In this reorganization it formed table of distribution (t/d) airlift units, including the 9th Air Transport Squadron at Kelly Air Force Base, Texas, which it assigned to the 518th Air Transport Group. On 1 October, following the Air Force's requirement that such units be numbered with four digits, the squadron became the 1256th Air Transport Squadron and the group became the 1700th Air Transport Group.

Reactivation

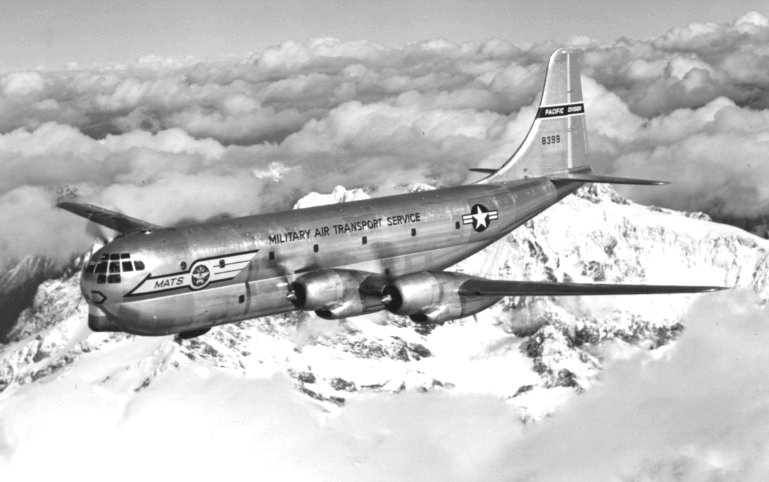
C-97 Stratofreighter Of Pacific Division, MATS

In 1952, MATS replaced most of its t/d air transport squadrons with table of organization units. In this renumbering, the squadron was reconstituted as the 55th Air Transport Squadron and activated on 20 July 1952, when it absorbed the mission, personnel and equipment of the 1256th Air Transport Squadron, which was simultaneously discontinued. The squadron moved to Travis Air Force Base, California in October 1953, where it was assigned to the 1501st Air Transport Group. It continued flying from Travis until inactivating on 8 March 1960 with the phaseout of the Boeing C-97 Stratofreighter from the MATS inventory.

=== Airlift in Europe ===
Background

On 1 July 1964, the 322d Air Division moved to Rhein-Main Air Base, Germany and was reassigned from United States Air Forces Europe (USAFE) to MATS. As part of the realignment of airlift responsibilities in Europe, MATS organized the 1455th Air Transport Squadron to manage its Douglas C-118 Liftmaster heavy transports and Convair C-131 Samaritan air evacuation aircraft in Europe. The squadron performed its medical evacuation missions in conjunction with medial personnel of the 2d Aeromedical Evacuation Group.

Reactivation

In January 1966, Military Airlift Command (MAC) replaced MATS. In this reorganization the squadron was once again activated as the 55th Military Airlift Squadron, and took over the 1455th Air Transport Squadron's mission, personnel and equipment. (Note: In this replacement, the 55th Squadron received the history and honors, but not the lineage of the 1455th Squadron.) In 1968, recognizing the emphasis on the squadron's aeromedical evacuation mission the squadron was redesignated the 55th Aeromedical Airlift Squadron. At the same time, it was transferred from MAC to USAFE, and it became a unit of the 7310th Tactical Airlift Wing.

In 1981, the squadron was tasked with the return of the Americans being released after being held hostage for two years in Iran. Because of the length of time they had been held in prison conditions, it was decided that aeromedical evacuation was called for, not ordinary airlift. The squadron flew two C-9s to Algiers, where an Air Algérie plane had flown them from Teheran. The squadron flew them to Germany, where the hostages were given medical exams at Wiesbaden Air Base before proceeding on to the United States.

In July 1993, the squadron moved from Rhein Main, which was in the process of becoming a civilian airport, to Ramstein Air Base, Germany, which was becoming USAFE's new airlift hub. On 1 September 1993, the squadron was inactivated and its airlift mission was assumed by the 75th and 76th Airlift Squadrons, which moved to Ramstein on paper from Travis Air Force Base, California and Charleston Air Force Base, South Carolina.

== Lineage ==
- Constituted as the 55th Ferrying Squadron on 30 August 1942

Activated on 16 September 1942
Redesignated 55th Transport Squadron on 24 March 1943
Disbanded on 13 October 1943

- Reconstituted and redesignated 55th Air Transport Squadron, Heavy on 16 July 1952

Activated on 20 July 1952
Discontinued and inactivated on 8 March 1960
Redesignated 55th Military Airlift Squadron, activated and organized on 8 January 1966
Discontinued on 24 December 1968

- Redesignated 55th Aeromedical Airlift Squadron and organized 24 December 1968

Inactivated 1 October 1993

=== Assignments ===
- 16th Ferrying Group (later 16th Transport Group), 16 September 1942 – 13 October 1943
- 1700th Air Transport Group, 20 July 1952
- 1501st Air Transport Group, 20 Oct 1953 – 8 March 1960
- 439th Military Airlift Group 8 January 1966 – 24 December 1968
- 7310th Tactical Airlift Wing, 24 December 1968
- 322d Tactical Airlift Wing, 1 January 1970
- 435th Tactical Airlift Wing, 31 March 1975
- 435th Tactical Airlift Group, 30 September 1978
- 435th Tactical Airlift Wing, 1 June 1980
- 435th Operations Group, 1 April 1992
- 86th Operations Group, 1 July–1 October 1993

=== Stations ===
- Camp Luna, New Mexico 16 September 1942
- Churchill, Manitoba, Canada, October 1942 – 13 October 1943 (Note: Mueller indicates that the "55th Ferrying Squadron" was stationed at Las Vegas Army Air Field, Nevada from September 1943 until it was disbanded Mueller, p. 443. This seems unlikely, since Las Vegas AAF was an AAF Training Command Base, not an Air Transport Command Base. Also, by this time only squadrons ferrying aircraft from manufacturers' plants retained the designation as Ferrying Squadrons, rather than Transport Squadrons and no aircraft manufacturer was located in Las Vegas. This error may arise from the fact that Camp Luna, where the squadron was located as a ferrying unit, was located at Las Vegas, New Mexico, while the field was at Las Vegas, Nevada.)
- Kelly Air Force Base, Texas, 20 July 1952
- Travis Air Force Base, California, 20 October 1953 – 8 March 1960
- Rhein-Main Air Base, Hesse, Germany, 8 January 1966
- Ramstein Air Base, Rhineland Palatinate, Germany, 1 July–1 October 1993

=== Aircraft ===
- Boeing C-97 Stratofreighter, 1953–1960
- Convair C-131 Samaritan, 1966-unknown
- Douglas C-119 Liftmaster, 1966-unknown
- Douglas C-9A Nightingale, unknown-1993

=== Awards and campaigns ===
Award streamer	Award	Dates	Notes
	Air Force Outstanding Unit Award	1 May 1967-13 June 1967	55th Military Airlift Squadron
	Air Force Outstanding Unit Award	1 April 1970-30 June 1970	55th Aeromedical Airlift Squadron
	Air Force Outstanding Unit Award	1 July 1970-30 November 1971	55th Aeromedical Airlift Squadron
	Air Force Outstanding Unit Award	1 July 1978-30 June 1980	55th Aeromedical Airlift Squadron
	Air Force Outstanding Unit Award	1 July 1981-30 June 1983	55th Aeromedical Airlift Squadron
	Air Force Outstanding Unit Award	1 July 1983-30 June 1985	55th Aeromedical Airlift Squadron
	Air Force Outstanding Unit Award	1 July 1985-30 June 1987	55th Aeromedical Airlift Squadron
	Air Force Outstanding Unit Award	1 July 1987-30 June 1989	55th Aeromedical Airlift Squadron
	Air Force Outstanding Unit Award	1 July 1989-30 June 1991	55th Aeromedical Airlift Squadron
	Air Force Outstanding Unit Award	2 August 1990-31 March 1991	55th Aeromedical Airlift Squadron
	Air Force Outstanding Unit Award	1 July 1991-30 June 1992	55th Aeromedical Airlift Squadron

Campaign Streamer	Campaign	Dates	Notes
	American Theater without inscription	16 September 1942 – 13 October 1943	55th Ferrying Squadron (later 55th Transport Squadron)
