= 2d Aeromedical Evacuation Squadron =

2nd Aeromedical Evacuation Squadron
- Active: 1957–1994
- Country: United States
- Branch: United States Air Force
- Role: Aeromedical evacuation

The 2nd Aeromedical Evacuation Squadron was a medical evacuation squadron of the United States Air Force. It was active from 1975 to 1994 at Rhein-Main Air Base, Germany.

It was assigned to the 435th Military Airlift Support Wing (later the 435th Tactical Airlift Wing) 31 March 1975 – 15 December 1978; 1 June 1980 – 1 April 1992. As an aeromedical evacuation unit, it was also associated with (but not assigned to) the hub of USAF aeromedical evacuation operations, the 375th Aeromedical Airlift Wing headquartered at Scott Air Force Base, Illinois.

It traces its history to the 2d Aeromedical Evacuation Group (AEG). The 7416th AEG, and its assigned units, all part of U.S. Air Forces in Europe, were reorganized on 8 April 1957 as the 2d AEG. The new 2d AEG comprised the 1st, 3rd, and 7th Aeromedical Evacuation Squadrons and the 18th Casualty Staging Flight. At the beginning of 1958 it was stationed at Évreux-Fauville Air Base in France. The 2d AEG was transferred to Military Airlift Command in 1974-75. By late 1980, the 2d AEG was reorganized as a squadron.

The 2nd Aeromedical Evacuation Squadron's operations included:

- Return of U.S. hostages from Iran, 1980 (alongside the 55th Aeromedical Airlift Squadron)
- Operation Desert Shield/Desert Storm

As part of the 1610th Air Division

- Operation Earnest Will

Crews from the 2d Aeromedical Evacuation Squadron and hospital staff from Wiesbaden Military Hospital responded via Lockheed C-141 Starlifter and C-9 Nightingale after the USS Samuel B. Roberts (FFG-58) struck a mine while operating as part of Operation Earnest Will in the Persian Gulf. Four of the ship's crew were airlifted to Germany.

- 1983 Marine Barracks Bombing in Beirut

In 1994 the 2nd AES was inactivated and its assets and personnel used to activate the 86th Aeromedical Evacuation Squadron.

== Lineage ==
- Constituted as the 2d Aeromedical Evacuation Group

Activated on 8 April 1957
Redesignated 2d Aeromedical Evacuation Squadron on 1 July 1975
Inactivated c. 1 October 1994

=== Assignments ===
- 7310th Air Base Group (later 7310th Support Group, 7310th Air Base Wing), 8 April 1957
- 322d Air Division, 1 July 1964
- 7322d Air Base Wing, 1 December 1968
- 322d Tactical Airlift Wing 1 January 1970
- 375th Aeromedical Airlift Wing, 1 April 1975
- 435th Tactical Airlift Wing (later 435th Airlift Wing), unknown
- 435th Operations Group, 1 April 1992
- 86th Operations Group, 1 July 1993 – c. 1 October 1994

=== Stations ===
- Dreux-Fauville Air Base, France, 8 April 1957
- Rhein-Main Air Base, 15 September 1958
- Ramstein Air Base, Germany, 1 July 1993 – c. 1 October 1994
