= 34th Strategic Squadron =

Former US Air Force unit

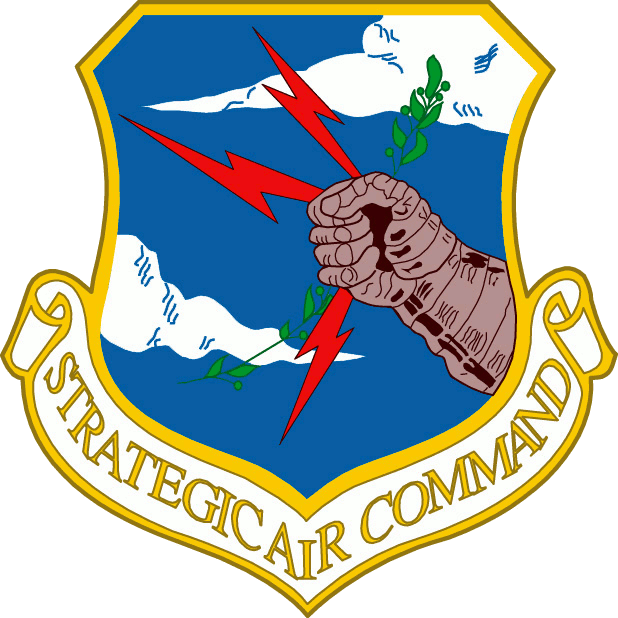
34th Strategic Squadron

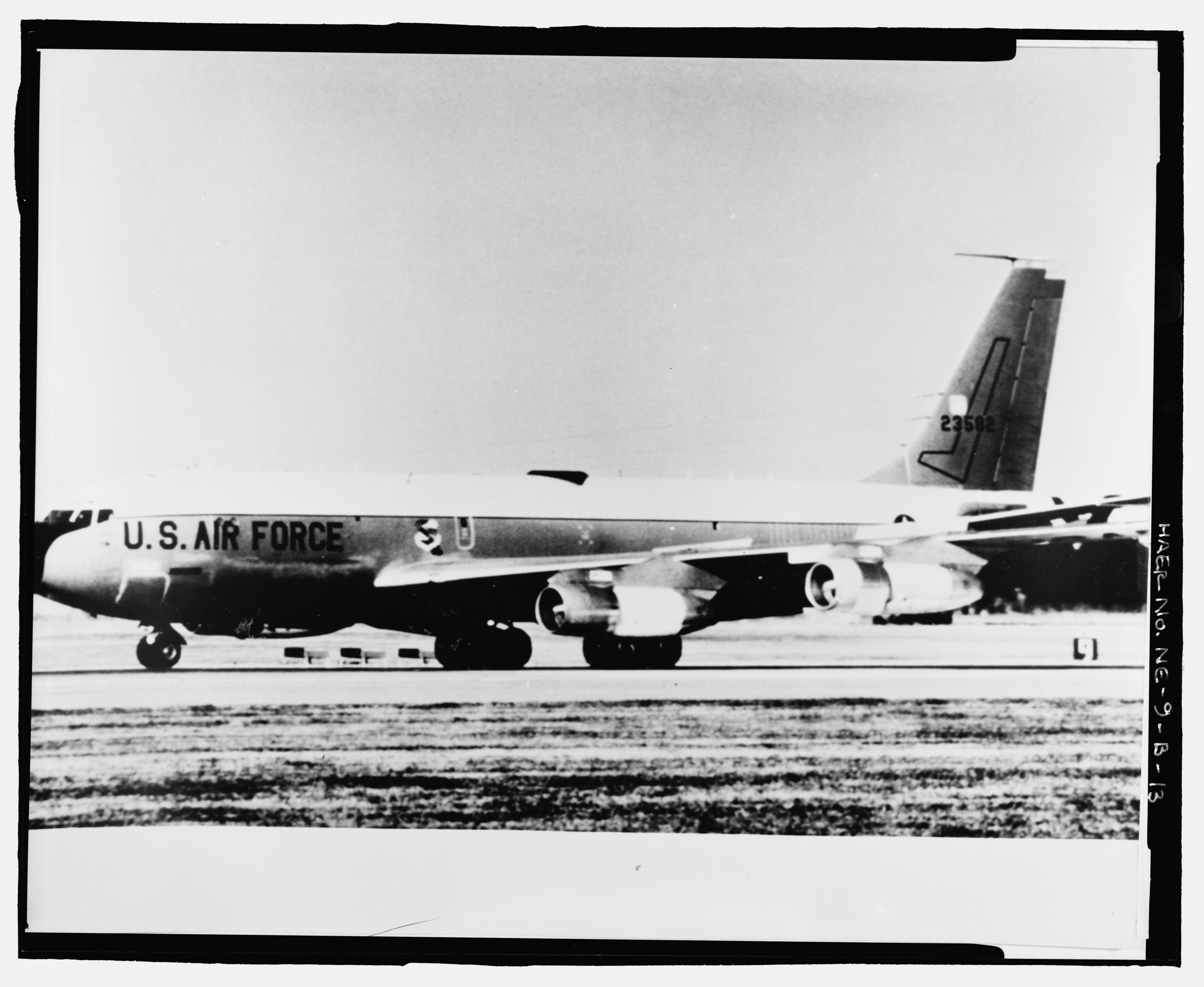
- Operation Looking Glass aircraft on runway at Offutt Air Force Base
- Active: 1942–1943; 1952–1955; 1958–1976; 1978–1990
- Country: United States
- Branch: United States Air Force
- Role: Control of deployed strategic forces
- Part of: Strategic Air Command
- Decorations: Air Force Outstanding Unit Award with Combat "V" Device; Air Force Outstanding Unit Award; Republic of Vietnam Gallantry Cross with Palm

Insignia
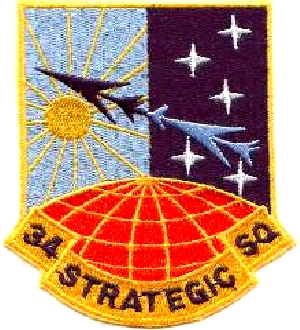
- Patch with 34th Strategic Squadron emblem

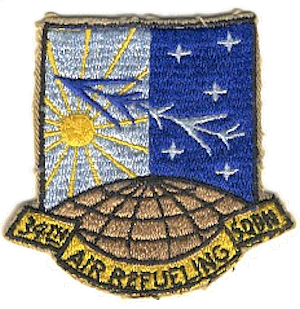
- Patch with 34th Air Refueling Squadron emblem

The 34th Strategic Squadron is an inactive United States Air Force unit. It was last assigned to the 11th Strategic Group at Zaragoza Air Base, Spain. It was inactivated on 7 August 1990.

The first predecessor of the squadron, the 34th Air Transport Squadron served on the South Atlantic ferrying route during World War II until it was disbanded in 1943. The squadron was reconstituted as a Military Air Transport Service unit at McChord Air Force Base from 1952 through 1955.

The 34th Air Refueling Squadron served as a refueling and command and control unit with Strategic Air Command from 1957 to 1972. The two squadrons were consolidated into a single unit in 1985.

== Overview ==
At Zaragoza the unit supported the European Tanker Task Force under the direction of the 7th Air Division located at Ramstein Air Base, Germany.

== History ==
=== World War II ===
The first predecessor of the squadron was activated at Ibura Airport, near Recife, Brazil in July 1942 as the 34th Ferrying Squadron, serving with the 9th Ferrying Group on the South Atlantic ferrying route. In March 1943, the group and squadron replaced their "ferrying" designation to "transport." In October 1943, Air Transport Command reorganized its overseas units and the 34th Squadron was disbanded and its personnel and equipment were transferred to Station 10, South Atlantic Wing, Air Transport Command.

=== Military Air Transport Service ===
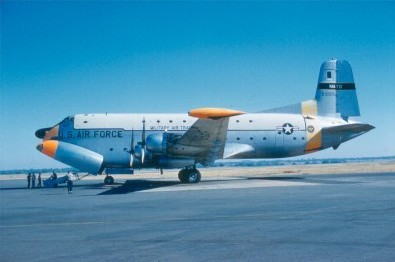
MATS C-124 Globemaster II

In 1952, Military Air Transport Service replaced most of its Major Command controlled airlift squadrons with Air Force controlled units. As part of this action, the 34th Air Transport Squadron, equipped with Douglas C-124 Globemaster IIs, was activated at McChord Air Force Base and assigned to the 1705th Air Transport Group. The squadron performed airlift missions in the western United States and Pacific area until inactivating in 1955.

=== Strategic Air Command ===
==== Operations in the United States ====
The 34th Air Refueling Squadron was initially activated at Offutt Air Force Base, Nebraska and assigned to the 340th Bombardment Wing at Whiteman Air Force Base, Missouri. It was equipped with Boeing KC-135A Stratotanker aircraft to provide Aerial refueling to Strategic Air Command (SAC) and other tactical aircraft.

In 1961 SAC looked for a practical airborne counterpart to its underground command post starting in July 1960. Five modified Boeing KC-135A Stratotanker aircraft were assigned to the 34th for this mission. One was kept on ground alert at all times. SAC periodically tested the squadron's ability to meet the 15-minute launch window established for these planes. A SAC general officer and a team of controllers were on each flight. The first Operation Looking Glass mission flown by the squadron took off on 3 February 1961. In March 1963, the squadron was equipped with eight specially-configured KC-135As for SAC's command and control mission. These planes were replaced the following August by KC-135B aircraft with turbofan engines and advanced electronics equipment. These aircraft could remain aloft for longer periods because they added receiver capabilities for air refueling operations, retaining their tanker configuration as well. These new aircraft were soon redesignated as Boeing EC-135Cs. In July 1965, these aircraft and their mission were transferred to the 38th Strategic Reconnaissance Squadron.

The squadron moved to Pease Air Force Base, New Hampshire on 25 June 1966 and flew KC-135 Stratotankers on a worldwide scale and was assigned to the 509th Bombardment Wing until inactivated on 31 March 1976.

==== European operations ====
On 1 August 1978, it was redesignated as the 34th Strategic Squadron and activated at Zaragoza Air Base, Spain supporting the European Tanker Task Force under the 7th Air Division at Ramstein Air Base, Germany.

On 19 September 1985 the 34th Strategic Squadron was consolidated with the 34th Air Transport Squadron, Heavy, a unit that was last active 1 July 1955.

The consolidated squadron was inactivated in preparation for the inactivation of SAC and the assumption of its European activities by elements of Air Combat Command, Air Mobility Command, and United States Air Forces Europe.

== Lineage ==
34th Air Transport Squadron

- Constituted as the 34th Ferrying Squadron and activated c. 9 July 1942

Redesignated 34th Transport Squadron c. 24 March 1943
Disbanded 10 October 1943

- Reconstituted on 20 June 1952 and redesignated 34th Air Transport Squadron, Heavy

Activated on 20 July 1952
Inactivated on 1 July 1955

- Consolidated on 19 September 1985 with the 34th Air Refueling Squadron as the 34th Air Refueling Squadron

34th Strategic Squadron

- Constituted as the 34th Air Refueling Squadron, Heavy

Activated on 1 October 1958
Inactivated on 1 March 1972

- Redesignated 34th Strategic Squadron

Activated on 1 August 1978

- Consolidated on 19 September 1985 with the 34th Air Transport Squadron

Inactivated on 31 March 1992

=== Assignments ===
- 9th Ferrying Group (later 9th Transport Group): c. 9 July 1942 – 10 October 1943
- 1705th Air Transport Group: 20 July 1952 – 1 July 1955
- 340th Bombardment Wing: 1 October 1958
- 4321st Strategic Wing: 1 October 1959
- 385th Strategic Aerospace Wing: 1 January 1963
- 818th Strategic Aerospace Division: 15 December 1964
- 810th Strategic Aerospace Division: 25 March 1965
- 509th Bombardment Wing: 25 June 1966 – 31 March 1976
- 7th Air Division: 1 August 1978
- 11th Strategic Group: 1 October 1986
- 306th Strategic Wing: 7 August 1990 – 31 March 1992

=== Stations ===
- Ibura Airport, Brazil, c. 9 July 1942 – 10 October 1943
- McChord Air Force Base, Washington, 20 July 1952 – 1 July 1955
- Offutt Air Force Base, Nebraska, 1 October 1958
- Pease Air Force Base, New Hampshire, 25 June 1966 – 31 March 1976
- Zaragoza Air Base, Spain, 1 August 1978 – 31 March 1992

=== Aircraft ===
- Various, 1942–1943
- Douglas C-124 Globemaster II, 1952–1955
- Boeing KC-135 Stratotanker, 1958–1976; 1978–1992
- Boeing EC-135A, 1961–1963
- Boeing EC-135C, 1963–1966
