= 58th Air Transport Squadron =

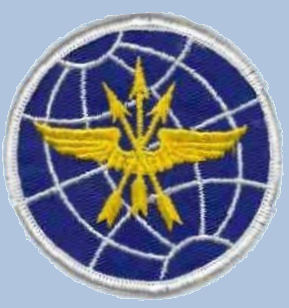
58th Air Transport Squadron

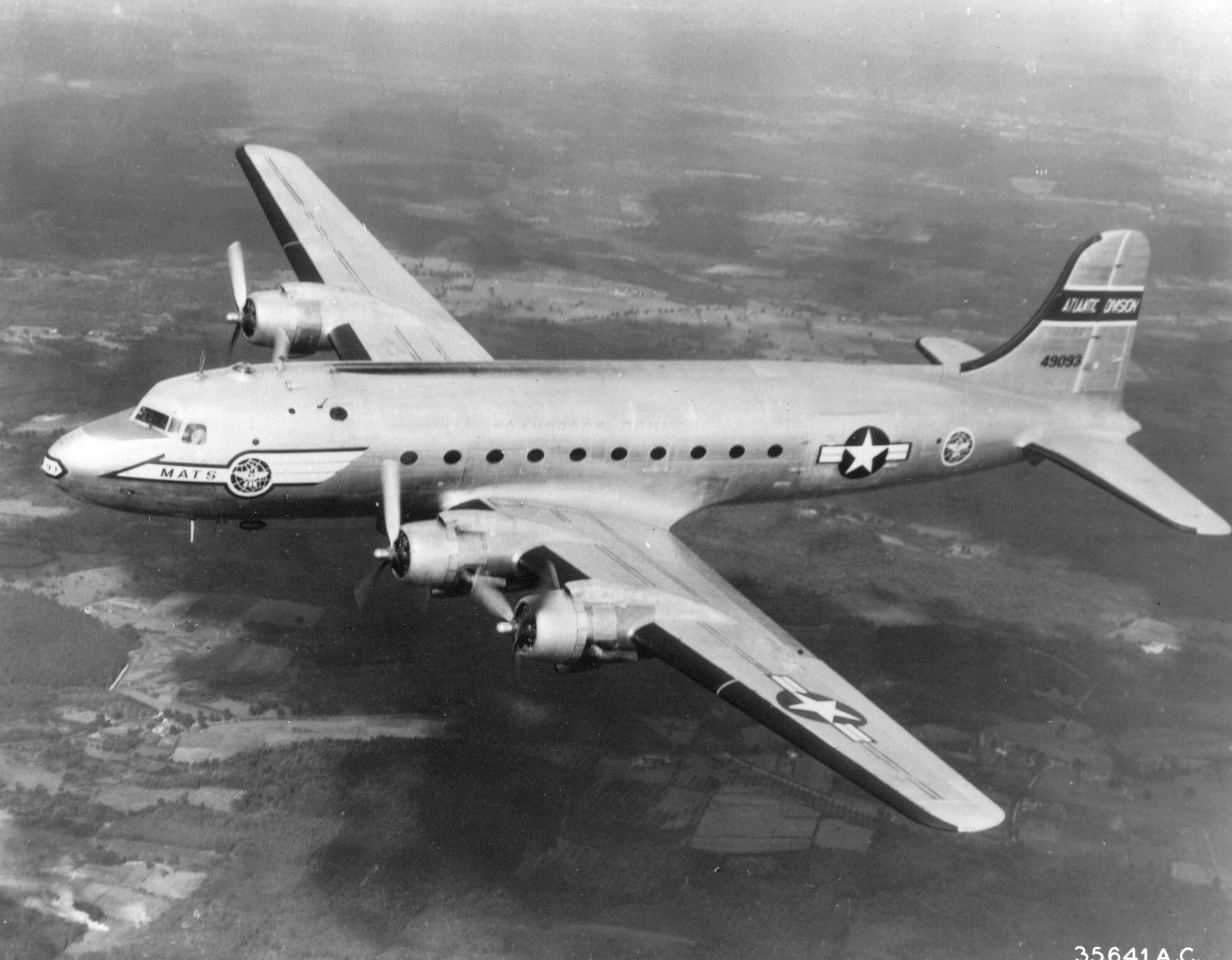
- C-54 Skymaster of Military Air Transport Service
- Active: 1942-1943; 1952-1960
- Country: United States
- Branch: United States Air Force
- Role: Airlift
- Part of: Military Air Transport Service

The 58th Air Transport Squadron is an inactive United States Air Force unit. It was last active at McGuire Air Force Base in July 1960, where it was assigned to the 1611th Air Transport Group.

The squadron was first active during World War II as a ferrying unit on the North Atlantic Ferry Route. It was activated again in the 1950s when Military Air Transport Service replaced its Table of Distribution air transport squadrons with Table of Organization and Equipment units.

== History ==
The squadron was first activated at Houlton Army Air Field, Maine in September 1942 as the 58th Air Corps Ferrying Squadron. It moved to Iceland, then Canada, where it supported the North Atlantic Ferry Route for Air Transport Command. It was replaced by Station 9, North Atlantic Wing, Air Transport Command in a general reorganization of Air Transport Command units in the fall of 1943.

The squadron was redesignated as the 58th Air Transport Squadron and activated at Kelly Air Force Base in July 1952, when it assumed the mission of 1286th Air Transport Squadron The 1286th had been organized at Kelly only four months earlier, on 7 March 1952, when Military Air Transport Service moved the Douglas C-124 Globemaster II aircraft stationed at Kelly to McChord Air Force Base, replacing them with Douglas C-54 Skymasters from McChord. It remained non-operational until May, when it received its first aircraft. (Note: The 1286th Squadron is not related to another 1286th Air Transport Squadron that was active at McChord Air Force Base, Washington from January to March 1952 as a training unit. "Abstract, History 1705 Air Transport Group Jan-Feb 1952". Air Force History Index..) In June 1955, the squadron moved to McGuire Air Force Base, New Jersey and was reassigned. In 1958, the squadron airlifted the Bob Hope and Tex Ritter United Service Organizations shows to Europe to perform for troops stationed there.

== Lineage ==
- Constituted as the 58th Air Corps Ferrying Squadron

Activated on 15 September 1943
Redesignated 58th Transport Squadron c.29 March 1943
Disbanded on 13 October 1943

- Reconstituted on 16 July 1952 as the 58th Air Transport Squadron, Medium

Activated on 20 July 1952
Inactivated on 18 July 1960

=== Assignments ===
- 16th Ferrying Group (later 16th Transport Group), 15 September 1942 – 13 October 1943
- 1700th Air Transport Group, 20 July 1952
- 1611th Air Transport Group, 30 June 1955 – 28 July 1960

=== Stations ===
- Houlton Army Air Field, Maine, 15 September 1942
- Meeks Field, Iceland, March 1943
- Crystal I (Fort Chimo), Quebec, Canada, 1943 – 13 October 1943
- Kelly Air Force Base, Texas, 20 July 1952
- McGuire Air Force Base, New Jersey, 30 June 1955 – 18 July 1960

=== Aircraft ===
- Douglas C-54 Skymaster, 1952–1960
