= Rhein-Main Air Base =

United States Air Force Base in Germany (Permanently Closed)

- Near Frankfurt, Hesse in Germany
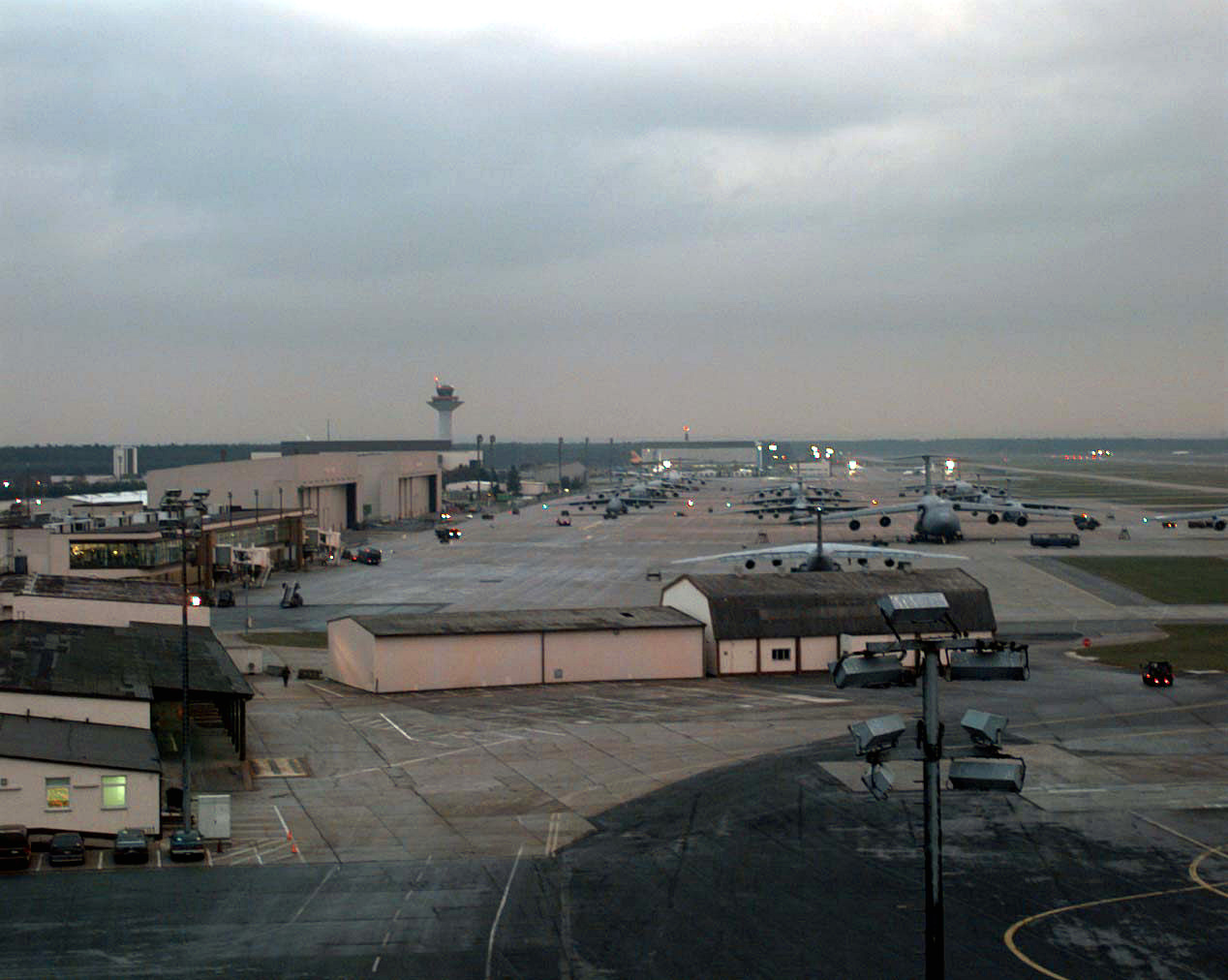
- Rhein-Main Air Base in 1995

Site information
- Type: US Air Force base
- Owner: German Federal Government
- Operator: United States Air Force
- Controlled by: United States Air Forces in Europe
- Open to the public: No
- Condition: Closed
- Website: Official website (archived)

Location
- Location within Germany Location within Hesse
- Coordinates: 50°1′48.7″N 8°35′16.97″E

Site history
- Built: 1936
- In use: 1945–2005
- Fate: Redeveloped as Terminal 3 of Frankfurt Airport
- Events: Berlin Airlift (1948); Starfighter crash (1983); Terrorist attack (1985)

Airfield information
- Identifiers: ICAO: EDAF, FAA LID: FRF, WMO: 106373

Rhein-Main Air Base was a United States Air Force air base near the city of Frankfurt am Main, Germany. It was a Military Airlift Command (MAC) and United States Air Forces in Europe (USAFE) installation, occupying the south side of Frankfurt Airport. Its military airport codes (IATA: FRF, ICAO: EDAF) are discontinued. Established in 1945, Rhein-Main Air Base was the primary airlift and passenger hub for USAFE. It was billed as the "Gateway to Europe". It closed on 30 December 2005.

During its lifetime, the base's host airlift wing operated C-130 Hercules and C-9A Nightingale aircraft, as well as supporting many transient C-5 Galaxy, C-141 Starlifter, C-17 Globemaster III, KC-135 Stratotanker, and KC-10 Extender flight operations each day. Daily or weekly contract air passenger flights were also conducted for United States personnel arriving in or leaving Europe.

== History ==
=== Post-war reconstruction ===
After the U.S. 7th Army moved through the Frankfurt area, the 826th Engineer Aviation Battalion (EAB), a unit of the IX Engineer Command, arrived at Frankfurt/Rhein-Main Airfield on 26 April 1945. The facility was classified as Advanced Landing Ground (ALG) Y-73. On 11 May 1945, the engineers began the task of clearing rubble and reconstructing major buildings. The Army engineers built new runways, aprons, hardstands, and taxiways leading to the terminal, as well as extending and widening the existing runway.

=== Initial post-war use ===
Frankfurt/Rhein-Main Airfield was initially used by the Ninth Air Force as a tactical fighter base.

Tactical air groups initially stationed at the airfield included:

- 362d Fighter Group (8 April 1945 – 30 April 1945)
- 377th Fighter Group (14 April 1945 – 2 May 1945)
- 378th Fighter Group (14 April 1945 – 2 May 1945)
- 379th Fighter Group (8 April 1945 – 30 April 1945)
- 425th Night Fighter Squadron (12 April 1945 – 2 May 1945)

=== Air transport mission ===
The first USAAF transport unit assigned to Rhein-Main was the 466th Air Service Group, activated on 20 November 1945. The 466th operated the aerial port, with a mixture of C-47 Skytrain, C-46 Commando, and C-54 Skymaster aircraft using the base for transport operations.

Construction of the Rhein-Main transport passenger and cargo terminal was completed in 1946, allowing an increase of air traffic into the base after the closure of the military passenger terminal at Orly Air Base, France. In March 1947, the USAFE Eastern Air Transport Service opened its hub at Rhein-Main.

The 61st Troop Carrier Group (TCG) was reassigned to Rhein-Main on 30 September 1946 from nearby Eschborn Air Base. The group assumed control of the transport mission, carrying out routine operations from the base using C-47 and C-54 aircraft. The 61st TCG comprised the 14th, 15th, and 53rd Troop Carrier Squadrons.

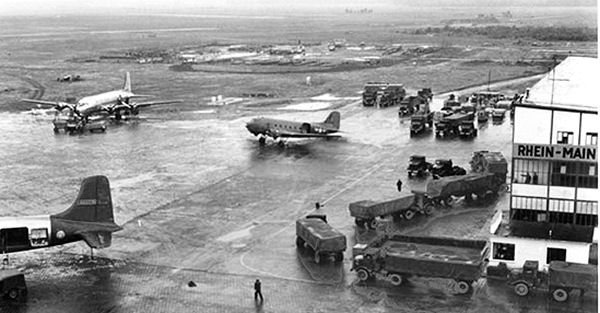
At Rhein-Main Air Base, military and civilian supplies from Giessen Quartermaster Depot arrive in trucks of the 67th Transportation Company for transfer to waiting aircraft during the Berlin Airlift.

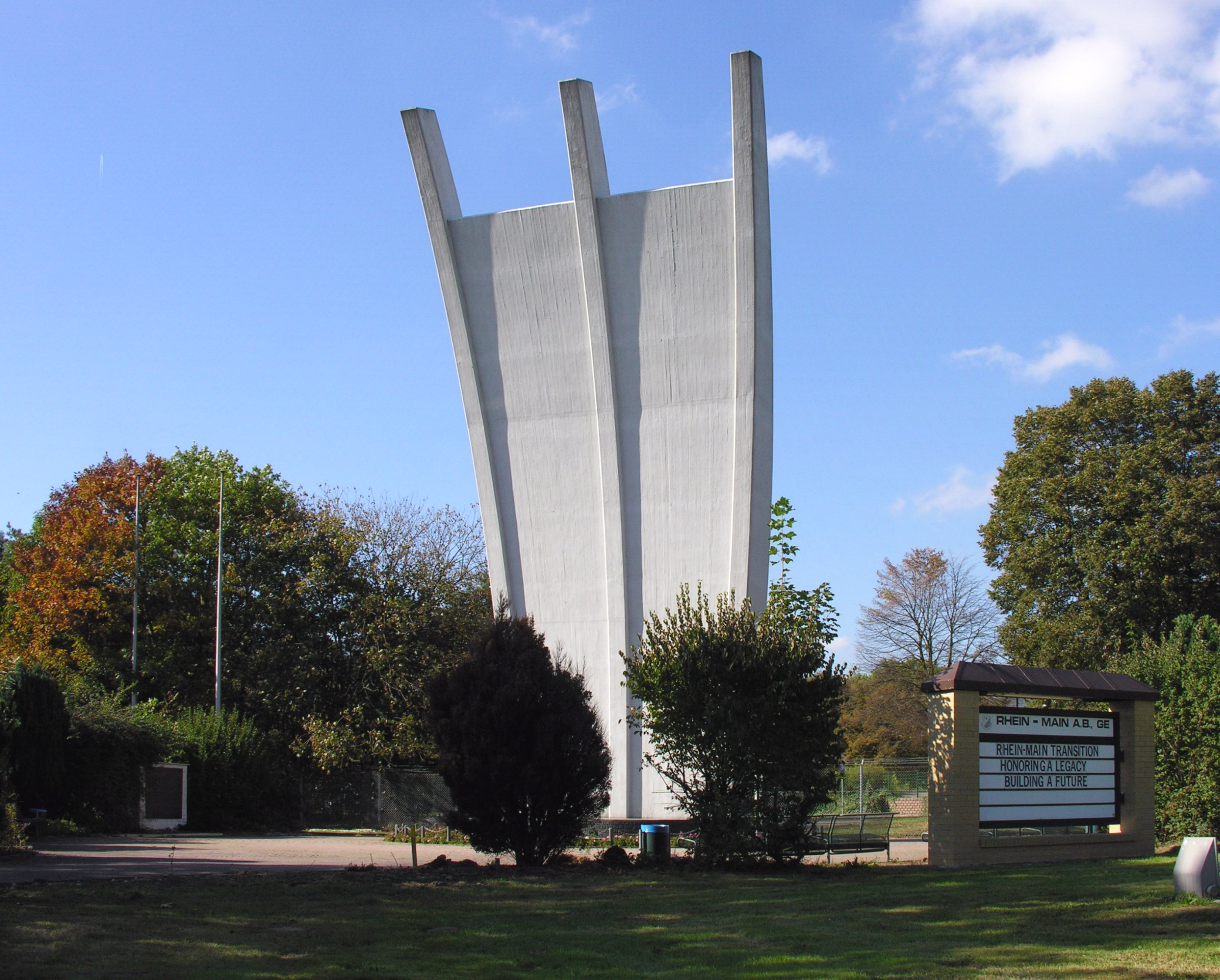
Berlin Airlift Memorial (built in 1985).

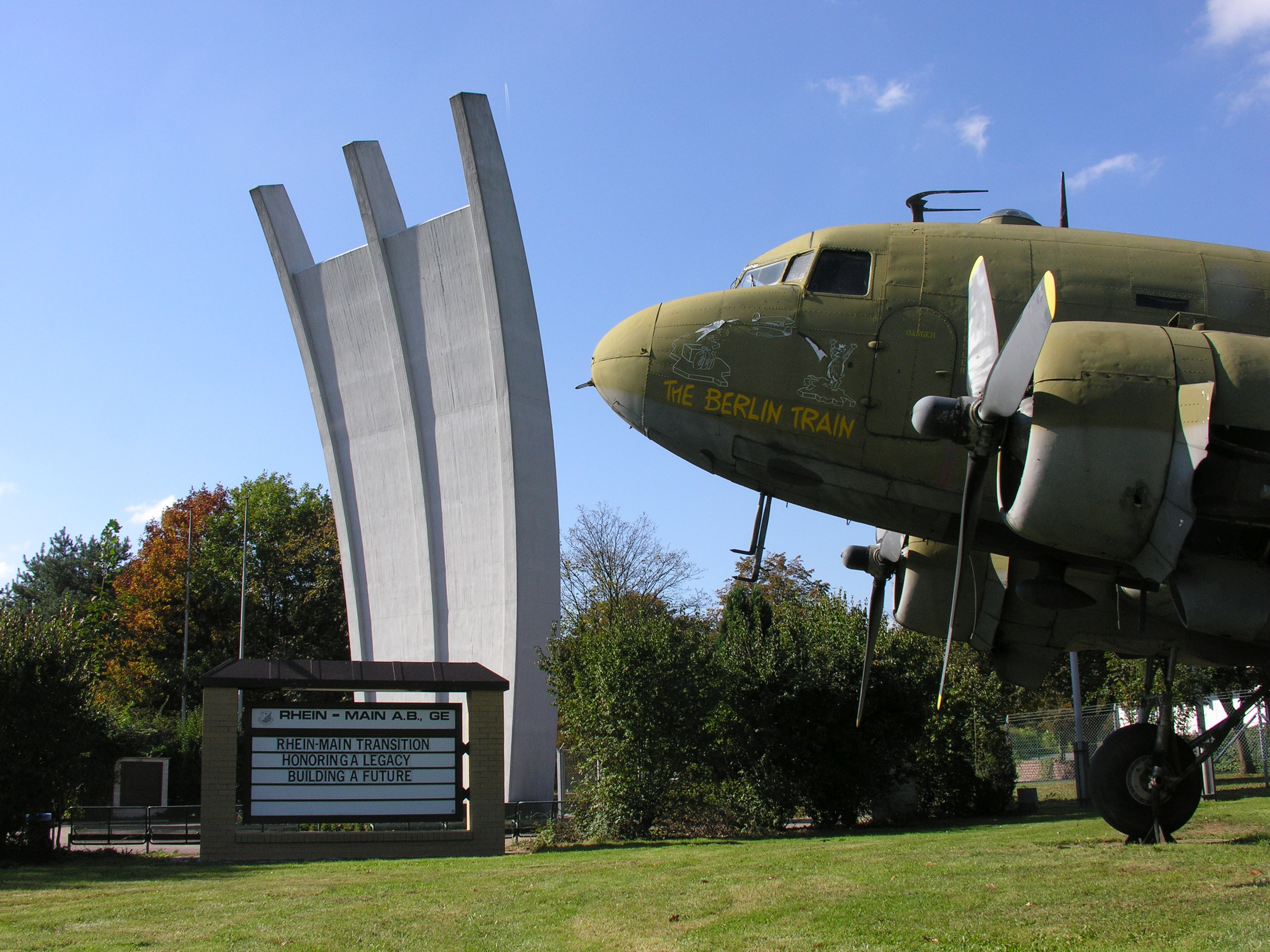
Memorial with a Douglas C-47 Skytrain (USAF) nearby.

=== Berlin airlift ===
The ongoing dispute over Berlin strained relations between the Soviet Union and the Western Allies (United States, United Kingdom, France). On 24 June 1948, the Soviet Union blocked access to the three Western-held sectors of Berlin, which lay deep within the Soviet-controlled zone of Germany, by cutting off all rail and road routes going through Soviet-controlled territory.

The next day, 25 June, the commander of the American occupation zone in Germany, General Lucius D. Clay, gave the order to launch a massive airlift using both civil and military aircraft. Rhein-Main Air Base became the main terminal in western Germany for the American airlift. Aircraft of the 61st TCG participated using C-54 Skymasters to ferry coal, flour, and other cargo into West Berlin. Additional Troop Carrier Squadrons (20th, 48th and 54th) were assigned to the 61st group.

On 19 November 1948, the 513th Troop Carrier Group (Special) was activated at Rhein-Main Air Base to assist in the airlift, also using C-54s. Troop Carrier Squadrons activated with the 513th were the 313th, 330th, 331st, 332d, and 333d squadrons.

Nearly a year after the blockade began, the Soviet Union lifted it at 00:01, on 12 May 1949. However, the airlift did not end until 30 September, as the Western nations wanted to build up sufficient amounts of supplies in West Berlin in case the Soviets blockaded it again.

=== 1949–1959 ===
Although originally envisioned as a bomber base by USAFE, as a result of the Berlin Airlift, Rhein-Main became a principal European air transport terminal. With the end of the blockade, the 513th TCG was inactivated on 16 October 1949. The 61st TCG returned to routine transport operations until the outbreak of the Korean War, and on 21 July 1950, was reassigned to McChord Air Force Base, Washington.

The 61st was replaced by the 60th Troop Carrier Wing, which transferred from Wiesbaden Air Base, West Germany on 2 June 1950. The 60th was equipped with the heavier C-82 Packet cargo aircraft. In 1953, the C-119 Flying Boxcar arrived, bringing an increased cargo capability to the wing. The 60th TCW consisted of the 10th, 11th and 12th Troop Carrier Squadrons.

In 1955, with the opening of USAFE bases in France, most heavy transport flights were shifted there and Rhein-Main became a passenger and tactical cargo hub. The 60th Troop Carrier Wing relocated to Dreux-Louvillier Air Base, France on 15 October 1955.

The 1614th Support Squadron of the Military Air Transport Service's (MATS) 1602d Air Transport Wing headquartered at Châteauroux, France provided aircraft maintenance, passenger services, air cargo handling, hotel operations and airlift operational support during the 1950s and 1960s. Rhein-Main was placed under the 7310th Air Base Wing, which for over a decade provided ground service as well as cargo and passenger loading and unloading for USAFE and MATS transports.

USAFE turned over the northern part of the base to the German government for use as Flughafen Frankfurt am Main, the chief commercial airport for the greater Frankfurt area, in April 1959. The remainder of the base remained in USAF hands as the principal aerial port for the US Department of Defense in Germany.

=== Military dependents ===
From 1947 until the 1960s, dependent children of military and government personnel living on base or in the surrounding communities attended Rhein-Main School for grades Kindergarten through 8th grade and Frankfurt American High School above 8th grade.

=== 1960s ===
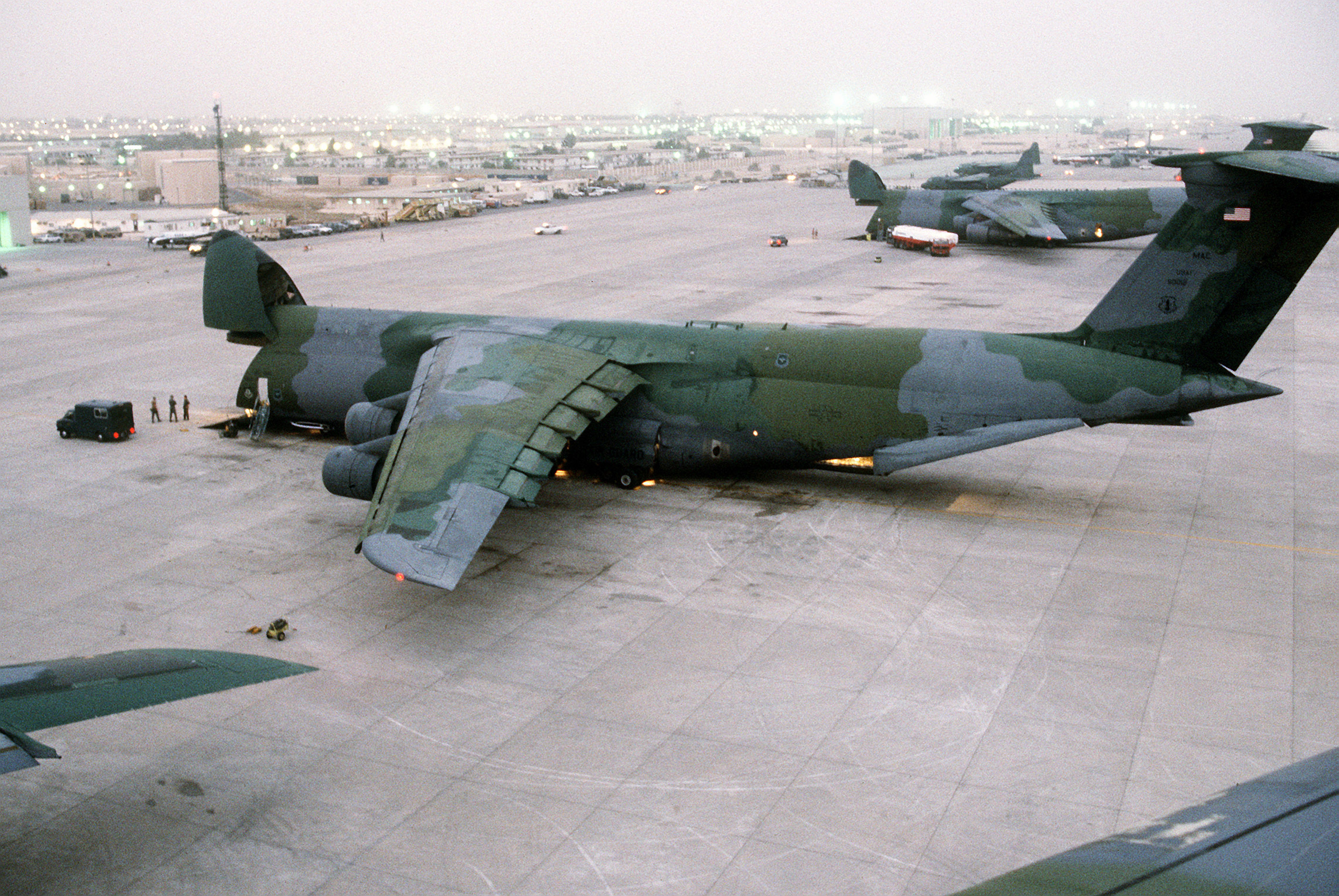
C-5As from Rhein-Main AB being offloaded in the Middle East during Operation Desert Shield.

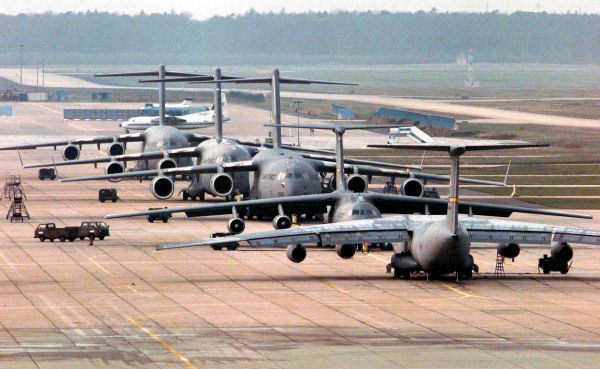
U.S. Air Force C-17 Globemaster IIIs and C-141 Starlifters are parked on the ramp at Rhein-Main Air Base, Germany, on 26 December 1995. The aircraft were used to deploy troops and equipment for the NATO Implementation Force (IFOR) in Bosnia and Herzegovina and neighboring countries supporting Operation Joint Endeavor.

The 1966 closure of USAFE bases in France increased cargo traffic at Rhein-Main extensively. On 1 July 1969, Military Airlift Command (MAC) transferred the 435th Tactical Airlift Wing from RAF High Wycombe in the United Kingdom to Rhein-Main as host unit and upgraded its facilities.

Squadrons assigned to Rhein-Main along with the 435th TAW included the following:

- 37th Tactical Airlift Squadron operating C-130Hercules (Assigned 1 October 1977)
- 55th Aeromedical Airlift Squadron operating C-9A Nightingale
- 630th Military Airlift Support Squadron (MASSq)
- 322nd Combat Support Group (CSG)

The 55th Aeromedical Airlift Squadron flew aeromedical missions throughout the USAFE AOR.

Other Military Airlift Command squadrons were assigned to USAFE bases, notably at Torrejón AB, Spain and Inçirlik AB, Turkey. These were also assigned as subordinate units of the 435th TAW.

The 630th MASSq operated Rhein-Main's freight and passenger terminals providing aircraft maintenance for transitory C-17 Globemaster III, C-141 Starlifter and C-5 Galaxy aircraft supporting aerial ports throughout Europe, the Middle East, and Africa. As a result, Temporary Duty (TDY) support of missions was not uncommon. Rhein-Main AB served as the principal Port of Entry for all U.S. servicemen and women serving in West Germany as well as military and diplomatic air freight destined for U.S. bases and embassies throughout USAFE's Area of Responsibility (AOR).

=== 1970–1990 ===
On 1 July 1975, the USAF and Military Airlift Command entered into an agreement with the Federal Republic of Germany that only transport aircraft would be stationed at Rhein-Main Air Base.

On 10 December 1978, a group of military dependents evacuated from Iran on C-141s landed at Rhein-Main after leaving Tehran late the day before. They had spent the first night in Athens, their second leg of the trip was to Rhein-Main, then on to McGuire Air Force Base. Each plane held approximately 150 women and children.

Later, on 20 January 1981, the American hostages held during the Iran hostage crisis were flown to Rhein-Main in a C-9A Nightingale aeromedical aircraft.

On 23 October 1983, the bombing of the Marine barracks in Beirut, Lebanon occurred. Rhein Main AB was instrumental in the processing of the casualties from that bombing in the days and weeks to follow. 241 military personnel perished in the blast.

During the Soviet-Afghan War of the 1980s, Rhein-Main AB was the primary airbase supporting a program run by the Deputy Assistant Secretary of Defense for Global Affairs, under the authority of George M. Dykes, IV, DoD Director of Humanitarian Assistance, supporting Afghan guerrillas (at that time known as Mujaheddin and later as the Taliban) in their fight against the Soviet Union. Over 100 Afghan Relief Flights were flown using C-141 Starlifter and C-5 Galaxy aircraft. Another 10 Pack Animal Transport flights, flown by Flying Tigers Airlines in B747F aircraft, transported Texas mules to Afghanistan in a covert operation providing logistics to the Afghan guerrillas.

These missions were routed through the airbase. They included approximately 50 aeromedical evacuation flights bringing combat wounded Afghan guerrillas, as well as women and children, from PAF Base Nur Khan, Chaklala, Pakistan to the US and Europe for surgery. These flights were supported by the 55th AAS with medical aircrews from the 2d Aeromedical Evacuation Squadron.

On 8 August 1985, the Red Army Faction snuck a car laden with explosives onto the base and parked it behind the headquarters building. At approximately 7:15 AM the car exploded killing Airman First Class Frank Scarton of Michigan and Becky Jo Bristol of San Antonio, Texas, and wounding 20 others.

=== Post-Cold War ===
In 1990, Rhein-Main Air Base was a major staging base for supplies and equipment heading to the Gulf War, with many cargo aircraft originating from home bases in the United States stopping at the base on their support missions.

The 37th TAS also took part in airlift operations during Operations Desert Shield/Storm in Southwest Asia from 14 August 1990 – 29 March 1991. It also air-dropped humanitarian supplies supporting Operation Provide Comfort for the relief of fleeing Kurdish refugees in northern Iraq in April–May 1991.

Starting in July 1992, the 37th TAS conducted airlift and airdrop missions to Bosnia and Herzegovina supporting Operation Provide Promise.

The U.S. staged Operation Provide Hope, a substantial airlift in February 1992 to the former Soviet Union, from Rhein-Main AB. The operation also had a much larger ground logistics phase, and in late February, a closing ceremony to the airlift phase was held at Rhein-Main AB, using a Russian Antonov An-124 cargo aircraft to transport the last shipment of air-delivered supplies.

On 1 April 1992 the 435th TAW was realigned from Military Airlift Command to United States Air Forces in Europe and redesignated as the 435th Airlift Wing (435 AW). The 37th Tactical Airlift Squadron (37 TAS) became the 37th Airlift Squadron (37 AS) on the same date.

At its peak, Rhein-Main AB had a population of 10,000. However, by 1993, USAF officials announced the intent to downsize the base by half.

On 1 July 1993, the 55th Aeromedical Airlift Squadron moved to Ramstein Air Base with its C-9A Nightingale aircraft. The 37th Airlift Squadron was subsequently reassigned to Ramstein on 1 October 1994. With these moves completed and most heavy Air Mobility Command (AMC) airlifters moving transcontinental cargo and passenger traffic to Ramstein and Spangdahlem Air Base, the stage was set for a complete closure in 2005.

On 1 April 1995, the 435 AW was inactivated and replaced with the 469th Air Base Group under USAFE command and the 726th Air Mobility Squadron (726 AMS) under AMC. The 469 ABG inactivated on 10 October 2005. The 726th Air Mobility Squadron was the last unit at the base.

From September 2001 until 2005, Rhein-Main continued to provide support for transient military cargo aircraft and AMC-chartered civilian airliners supporting military transport activities throughout Europe, also acting as a waypoint for air mobility operations throughout Southwest Asia towards the wars in Afghanistan and Iraq.

== Special operations ==
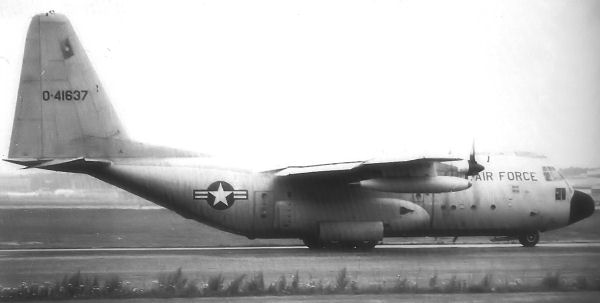
Lockheed C-130A-LM Hercules, AF Serial No. 54-1637 of the 7406th Operations Squadron

Although the primary mission of Rhein-Main was strategic and tactical airlift, the base also operated a substantial set of special operations missions.

The 7406th Operations Squadron was activated at Rhein-Main on 10 May 1955 receiving its first aircraft (RB-50s) in March 1956. These jet-powered aircraft were replaced with specially configured C-130A-II reconnaissance aircraft in 1958, mostly indistinguishable from other common C-130 aircraft. The 7406th operated and maintained the aircraft and provided the front-end flight crews (pilots, navigators, flight engineers, etc.). A separate USAF Security Service squadron provided the crew as intelligence collection operators on the aircraft.

One of these C-130s (56-0528) was shot down with the loss of a crew of seventeen over Yerevan, Soviet Armenia on 2 September 1958. Four Soviet MiG-17 pilots took turns firing on the unarmed C-130 when the American aircraft penetrated Soviet airspace while on a mission along the Turkish-Armenian border.

Between 5–10 June 1967, during the Arab-Israeli Six-Day War, the 7406th flew missions over the battle zone gathering electronic intelligence data.

The 7406th continued flying recon missions from Rhein-Main in the C-130B models until 30 June 1973 when the squadron's sister Security Service flying squadron moved to Ellinikon International Airport, Athens, Greece (known to the U.S. as Hellenikon Air Base). Operational missions were flown until 13 June 1974 from Greece when the unit was disbanded. The 7206th nomenclature continued, embodied in the 7206th Air Base Group as a support group in Athens until 1993. Surveillance missions continued from Hellenikon under the auspices of the 6916th Electronic Security Squadron (ESS).

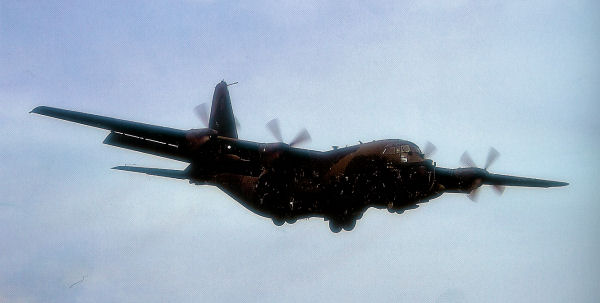
MC-130E of the 7th Special Operations Squadron

With the relocation of the 7406th to Greece, the 7th Special Operations Squadron was moved from Ramstein to Rhein-Main as one of the units shuffled as part of Operation Creek Action. The 7406th's Hercules aircraft had been used for covert communications intelligence (COMINT) missions along the Eastern Bloc borders. The 7th SOS's MC-130Es, code-named Combat Talon, were no less mysterious and were also striking to look at with their matte black camouflage scheme and two large hooks on the nose. The 7th SOS's MC-130Es were spotted in every corner of Europe.

The 7th SOS was reassigned under the 7575th Operations Group in 1977, and then to the 39th Aerospace Rescue and Recovery Wing on 1 February 1987. It was relocated to RAF Alconbury in the United Kingdom in December 1992, coming under a different group in the process.

The 7575th Operations Group operated at Rhein-Main from 1 July 1977 to 31 March 1991. Initially, three unique subordinate units were assigned to the group: the 7405th Operations Squadron, the 7580th Operations Squadron, and the 7th Special Operations Squadron. The 7405th had recently moved from Wiesbaden Air Base and converted to flying heavily modified C-130E Hercules reconnaissance aircraft. The 7405th provided the front-end crews as well as some special system operators, while the 7580th was supplied electronic warfare officers operating signals intelligence (SIGINT) equipment and specialized aircraft maintenance personnel. The mission of the 7405th and 7580th was to conduct covert reconnaissance flights through the West Berlin Air Corridors, also known as the Berlin corridors and control zone.

The 7575th Operations Group ceased their reconnaissance mission soon after the fall of the Berlin Wall, and was inactivated shortly after that.

== Closure ==
On 23 December 1999, the U.S. and German governments agreed to close the base. The last military flights involving the base took place in late September 2005 with the formal closure ceremony taking place on 10 October 2005. The final handover to the German government occurred on 30 December 2005 and the 726th AMS transferred to Spangdahlem Air Base.

Subsequently, the Frankfurt Airport Authority leveled the entire base, and in October 2015, commenced building what would become a third passenger terminal (Terminal 3) and other airport facilities.

In 2019, it became known that excavated soil from the construction site for Terminal 3 was contaminated with PFAS chemicals with the volume of polluted soil being approximately 600,000 cubic metres. It was considered highly probable that the contamination originated with firefighting foams which had been used by USAFE, primarily for training purposes.

== See also ==
- 1983 Rhein-Main Starfighter crash
